= 2022 Alabama House of Representatives election =

2022 Alabama House of Representatives elections
- November 8, 2022

All 105 seats in the Alabama House of Representatives 53 seats needed for a majority
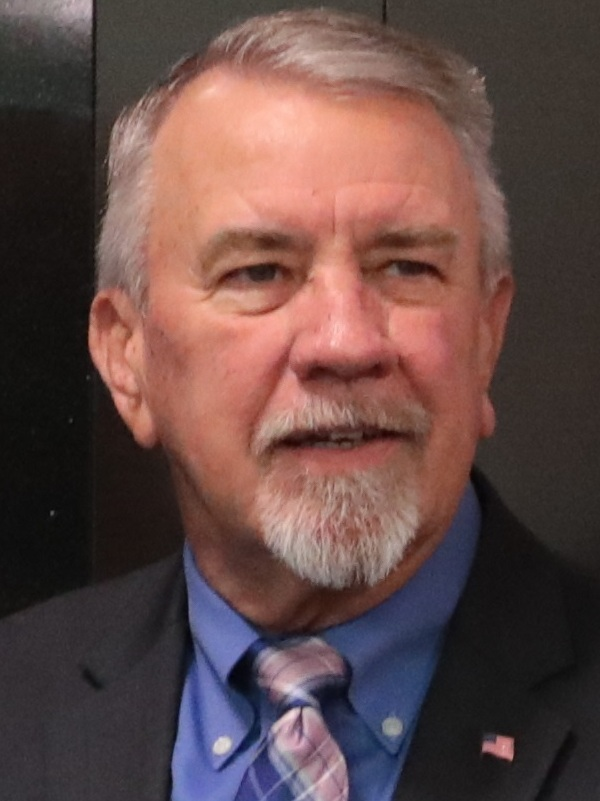

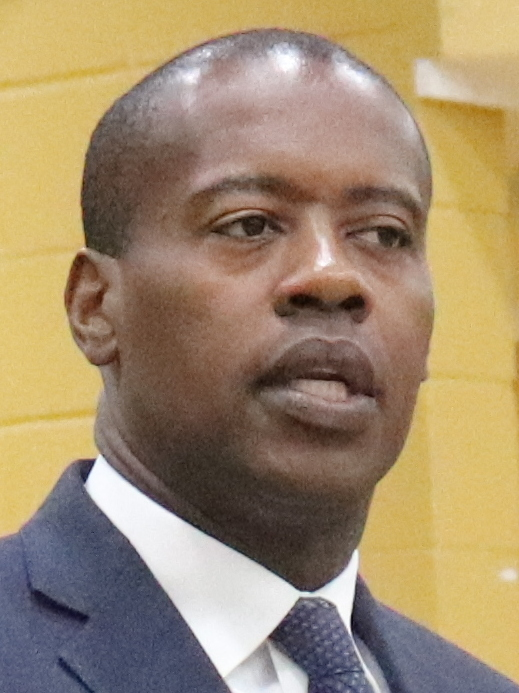
| | Majority party | Minority party |
|---|---|---|
| Leader | Mac McCutcheon (retired) | Anthony Daniels |
| Party | Republican | Democratic |
| Leader since | August 15, 2016 | February 22, 2017 |
| Leader's seat | 25th | 53rd |
| Last election | 77 | 28 |
| Seats won | 77 | 28 |
| Seat change | Steady | Steady |
| Popular vote | 857,167 | 297,978 |
| Percentage | 71.30% | 24.79% |
| Swing | ▲8.57% | ▼11.72% |
- Democratic gain Republican gain Democratic hold Republican hold 50–60% 60–70% 70–80% 80–90% >90% 50–60% 60–70% 70–80% 80–90% >90%
Speaker before election
Mac McCutcheon
Republican
Elected Speaker
Nathaniel Ledbetter
Republican

The 2022 Alabama House of Representatives elections were held on November 8, 2022. The Republican and Democratic primaries were held on May 24, 2022, and any races in which no candidate exceeded one-half plus one of the total votes advanced to a runoff on June 21, 2022. This was the first election cycle since 2002 in which the Libertarian Party of Alabama was on the ballot, as they exceeded the threshold for petition signatures needed to gain ballot access in Alabama. Libertarian candidates were nominated by party convention. All 105 of Alabama's state representatives were up for reelection. In Alabama, members of both the House of Representatives and the Senate serve four-year terms, running in years corresponding with presidential midterm elections.

== Retirements ==
=== Republicans ===
1. District 2: Lynn Greer retired.
2. District 3: Andrew Sorrell retired to run for auditor of Alabama.
3. District 10: Mike Ball retired.
4. District 13: Connie Rowe retired.
5. District 15: Allen Farley retired.
6. District 20: Howard Sanderford retired.
7. District 25: Mac McCutcheon retired.
8. District 26: Kerry Rich retired.
9. District 31: Mike Holmes retired.
10. District 40: K. L. Brown retired.
11. District 61: Rodney Sullivan retired
12. District 62: Rich Wingo retired.
13. District 64: Harry Shiver retired.
14. District 89: Wes Allen retired to run for Alabama Secretary of State.
15. District 92: Mike Jones retired to run for state senator from District 31.
16. District 95: Steve McMillan retired.
17. District 100: Victor Gaston retired.

=== Democrats ===
1. District 56: Louise Alexander retired to run for state senator from District 19.
2. District 57: Merika Coleman retired to run for state senator from District 19.

== Incumbents defeated ==
=== In primary elections ===
==== Republicans ====
1. District 7: Proncey Robertson lost renomination to Ernie Yarbrough.
2. District 23: Tommy Hanes lost renomination to Mike Kirkland.
3. District 28: Gil Isbell lost renomination to Mack Butler.
4. District 45: Dickie Drake lost renomination to Susan DuBose.
5. District 88: Will Dismukes lost renomination to Jerry Starnes.
6. District 94: Joe Faust lost renomination to Jennifer Fidler.

==== Democrats ====
1. District 55: Rod Scott lost renomination to Fred Plump.
2. District 72: Ralph Anthony Howard lost renomination to Curtis Travis.

== Predictions ==
| Source | Ranking | As of |
|---|---|---|
| Sabato's Crystal Ball | Safe R | May 19, 2022 |

== Results ==
| District | Incumbent | Party | Elected | Party |
|---|---|---|---|---|
| 1 | Phillip Pettus | Rep | Phillip Pettus | Rep |
| 2 | Lynn Greer | Rep | Ben Harrison | Rep |
| 3 | Andrew Sorrell^{†} | Rep | Kerry Underwood | Rep |
| 4 | Parker Moore | Rep | Parker Moore | Rep |
| 5 | Danny Crawford | Rep | Danny Crawford | Rep |
| 6 | Andy Whitt | Rep | Andy Whitt | Rep |
| 7 | Proncey Robertson | Rep | Ernie Yarbrough | Rep |
| 8 | Terri Collins | Rep | Terri Collins | Rep |
| 9 | Scott Stadthagen | Rep | Scott Stadthagen | Rep |
| 10 | Mike Ball^{†} | Rep | David Cole | Rep |
| 11 | Randall Shedd | Rep | Randall Shedd | Rep |
| 12 | Corey Harbison | Rep | Corey Harbison | Rep |
| 13 | Connie Rowe | Rep | Matt Woods | Rep |
| 14 | Tim Wadsworth | Rep | Tim Wadsworth | Rep |
| 15 | Allen Farley^{†} | Rep | Leigh Hulsey | Rep |
| 16 | Kyle South | Rep | Kyle South | Rep |
| 17 | Tracy Estes | Rep | Tracy Estes | Rep |
| 18 | Jamie Kiel | Rep | Jamie Kiel | Rep |
| 19 | Laura Hall | Dem | Laura Hall | Dem |
| 20 | Howard Sanderford | Rep | James Lomax | Rep |
| 21 | Rex Reynolds | Rep | Rex Reynolds | Rep |
| 22 | Ritchie Whorton | Rep | Ritchie Whorton | Rep |
| 23 | Tommy Hanes | Rep | Mike Kirkland | Rep |
| 24 | Nathaniel Ledbetter | Rep | Nathaniel Ledbetter | Rep |
| 25 | Mac McCutcheon^{†} | Rep | Phillip Rigsby | Rep |
| 26 | Kerry Rich^{†} | Rep | Brock Colvin | Rep |
| 27 | Wes Kitchens | Rep | Wes Kitchens | Rep |
| 28 | Gil Isbell | Rep | Mack Butler | Rep |
| 29 | Vacant | | Mark Gidley | Rep |
| 30 | Craig Lipscomb | Rep | Craig Lipscomb | Rep |
| 31 | Mike Holmes | Rep | Troy Stubbs | Rep |
| 32 | Barbara Boyd | Dem | Barbara Boyd | Dem |
| 33 | Ben Robbins | Rep | Ben Robbins | Rep |
| 34 | David Standridge | Rep | David Standridge | Rep |
| 35 | Steve Hurst | Rep | Steve Hurst | Rep |
| 36 | Randy Wood | Rep | Randy Wood | Rep |
| 37 | Bob Fincher | Rep | Bob Fincher | Rep |
| 38 | Debbie Wood | Rep | Debbie Wood | Rep |
| 39 | Ginny Shaver | Rep | Ginny Shaver | Rep |
| 40 | K. L. Brown^{†} | Rep | Chad Robertson | Rep |
| 41 | Corley Ellis | Rep | Corley Ellis | Rep |
| 42 | Ivan Smith | Rep | Ivan Smith | Rep |
| 43 | Arnold Mooney | Rep | Arnold Mooney | Rep |
| 44 | Danny Garrett | Rep | Danny Garrett | Rep |
| 45 | Dickie Drake | Rep | Susan DuBose | Rep |
| 46 | David Faulkner | Rep | David Faulkner | Rep |
| 47 | David Wheeler | Rep | Mike Shaw | Rep |
| 48 | Jim Carns | Rep | Jim Carns | Rep |
| 49 | Russell Bedsole | Rep | Russell Bedsole | Rep |
| 50 | Jim Hill | Rep | Jim Hill | Rep |
| 51 | Allen Treadaway | Rep | Allen Treadaway | Rep |
| 52 | John Rogers | Dem | John Rogers | Dem |
| 53 | Anthony Daniels | Dem | Anthony Daniels | Dem |
| 54 | Neil Rafferty | Dem | Neil Rafferty | Dem |
| 55 | Rod Scott | Dem | Fred Plump | Dem |
| 56 | Louise Alexander | Dem | Ontario Tillman | Dem |
| 57 | Merika Coleman | Dem | Patrick Sellers | Dem |
| 58 | Rolanda Hollis | Dem | Rolanda Hollis | Dem |
| 59 | Mary Moore | Dem | Mary Moore | Dem |
| 60 | Juandalynn Givan | Dem | Juandalynn Givan | Dem |
| 61 | Rodney Sullivan^{†} | Rep | Ron Bolton | Rep |
| 62 | Rich Wingo^{†} | Rep | Bill Lamb | Rep |
| 63 | Cynthia Almond | Rep | Cynthia Almond | Rep |
| 64 | Harry Shiver^{†} | Rep | Donna Givens | Rep |
| 65 | Brett Easterbrook | Rep | Brett Easterbrook | Rep |
| 66 | Alan Baker | Rep | Alan Baker | Rep |
| 67 | Prince Chestnut | Dem | Prince Chestnut | Dem |
| 68 | Thomas Jackson | Dem | Thomas Jackson | Dem |
| 69 | Kelvin Lawrence | Dem | Kelvin Lawrence | Dem |
| 70 | Christopher J. England | Dem | Christopher J. England | Dem |
| 71 | Artis J. McCampbell | Dem | Artis J. McCampbell | Dem |
| 72 | Ralph Anthony Howard | Dem | Curtis Travis | Dem |
| 73 | Kenneth Paschal | Rep | Kenneth Paschal | Rep |
| 74 | Charlotte Meadows | Rep | Phillip Ensler | Dem |
| 75 | Reed Ingram | Rep | Reed Ingram | Rep |
| 76 | Patrice McClammy | Dem | Patrice McClammy | Dem |
| 77 | Tashina Morris | Dem | Tashina Morris | Dem |
| 78 | Kenyatté Hassell | Dem | Kenyatté Hassell | Dem |
| 79 | Joe Lovvorn | Rep | Joe Lovvorn | Rep |
| 80 | Chris Blackshear | Rep | Chris Blackshear | Rep |
| 81 | Ed Oliver | Rep | Ed Oliver | Rep |
| 82 | Pebblin Warren | Dem | Pebblin Warren | Dem |
| 83 | Jeremy Gray | Dem | Jeremy Gray | Dem |
| 84 | Berry Forte | Dem | Berry Forte | Dem |
| 85 | Dexter Grimsley | Dem | Rick Rehm | Rep |
| 86 | Paul Lee | Rep | Paul Lee | Rep |
| 87 | Jeff Sorrells | Rep | Jeff Sorrells | Rep |
| 88 | Will Dismukes | Rep | Jerry Starnes | Rep |
| 89 | Wes Allen^{†} | Rep | Marcus Paramore | Rep |
| 90 | Chris Sells | Rep | Chris Sells | Rep |
| 91 | Rhett Marques | Rep | Rhett Marques | Rep |
| 92 | Mike Jones^{†} | Rep | Matthew Hammett | Rep |
| 93 | Steve Clouse | Rep | Steve Clouse | Rep |
| 94 | Joe Faust | Rep | Jennifer Fidler | Rep |
| 95 | Steve McMillan^{†} | Rep | Frances Holk-Jones | Rep |
| 96 | Matt Simpson | Rep | Matt Simpson | Rep |
| 97 | Adline Clarke | Dem | Adline Clarke | Dem |
| 98 | Napoleon Bracy Jr. | Dem | Napoleon Bracy Jr. | Dem |
| 99 | Sam Jones | Dem | Sam Jones | Dem |
| 100 | Victor Gaston | Rep | Mark Shirey | Rep |
| 101 | Chris Pringle | Rep | Chris Pringle | Rep |
| 102 | Shane Stringer | Rep | Shane Stringer | Rep |
| 103 | Barbara Drummond | Dem | Barbara Drummond | Dem |
| 104 | Margie Wilcox | Rep | Margie Wilcox | Rep |
| 105 | Chip Brown | Rep | Chip Brown | Rep |

† - Incumbent not seeking re-election

== Closest races ==
Seats where the margin of victory was under 10%:

1. District 68, 3%
2. District 10, 6.63%
3. District 85, 8.08% (gain)

== Detailed results ==
=== Overview ===
↓
| 77 | 28 |
| Republican | Democratic |

| Parties | Candidates | Seats | | | | Popular Vote | | |
| Parties | Candidates | 2018 | 2022 | +/- | Strength | Votes | % | Change |
|---|---|---|---|---|---|---|---|---|
| Republican | 82 | 77 | 77 | Steady | 73.33 | 857,167 | 71.3 | ▲8.57% |
| Democratic | 47 | 28 | 28 | Steady | 26.67 | 297,978 | 24.79 | ▼11.72% |
| Libertarian | 27 | 0 | 0 | Steady | 0.00 | 32,127 | 2.67 | ▲2.52% |
| Write-ins | | 0 | 0 | Steady | 0.00 | 14,924 | 1.24 | ▲0.42% |
| Total | 156 | 105 | 105 | | 100.00 | 1,202,196 | 100 | – |
| Turnout | | | | | | | | |
| Registered | | | | | | | | |

=== District 1 ===
Second-term incumbent Republican representative Phillip Pettus had represented the 1st District since November 2014. Pettus was challenged by Florence lawyer Maurice McCaney in the Republican primary. Pettus won the primary by the skin of his teeth. No Democrats or Libertarians filed to run for the seat, leaving Pettus unopposed in the general election.

2022 Alabama House of Representatives general election, 1st District
| Party | Candidate | Votes | % |
|---|---|---|---|
| Republican | Phillip Pettus (incumbent) | 10,360 | 97.01 |
| Write-in | | 319 | 2.99 |
| Total votes | | 10,679 | 100.0 |
| Republican hold | | | |

2022 Alabama House of Representatives Republican primary election, 1st District
| Party | Candidate | Votes | % |
|---|---|---|---|
| Republican | Phillip Pettus (incumbent) | 3,875 | 52.46 |
| Republican | Maurice McCaney | 3,512 | 47.54 |
| Total votes | | 7,387 | 100 |

==== Endorsements ====
Phillip Pettus

Organizations

- Manufacture Alabama

PACs

- Alabama REALTORSPAC
- Alabama RetailPAC
- FarmPAC
- ForestPAC
- NFIB AlabamaPAC
Maurice McCaney

Organizations

- Stand for Health Freedom

=== District 2 ===
Third-term incumbent Republican representative Lynn Greer had represented the 2nd District since November 2010. He announced his retirement at the end of the 2022 election cycles. Former Limestone county commissioner Jason Black, photography studio owner Kimberly Butler, former Limestone County commissioner Ben Harrison and Lauderdale County resident Terrance Irelan all ran in the primary to replace Greer. No candidate gained over half of the vote in the primary, so Harrison and Black advanced to a runoff. In the primary runoff, Harrison defeated Black by a narrow margin. However, Kimberly Butler challenged the results of the primary after obtaining 42 signed affidavits of voters who were assigned to the wrong district after an error. Butler only finished 14 votes out of making the runoff. Her challenge was not heard by the Alabama Republican Party, allowing the results of both primary and the runoff elections to stand. Butler then announced she would run a write-in campaign. No Democrats or Libertarians filed to run for the seat, leaving Harrison unopposed on the general election ballot.

2022 Alabama House of Representatives general election, 2nd District
| Party | Candidate | Votes | % |
|---|---|---|---|
| Republican | Ben Harrison | 11,233 | 80.28% |
| Write-in | | 2,760 | 19.72% |
| Total votes | | 13,993 | 100 |
| Republican hold | | | |

2022 Alabama House of Representatives Republican primary runoff election, 2nd District
| Party | Candidate | Votes | % |
|---|---|---|---|
| Republican | Ben Harrison | 4,317 | 55.54% |
| Republican | Jason Spencer Black | 3,456 | 44.46% |
| Total votes | | 7,773 | 100 |

2022 Alabama House of Representatives Republican primary election, 2nd District
| Party | Candidate | Votes | % |
|---|---|---|---|
| Republican | Ben Harrison | 3,290 | 32.81% |
| Republican | Jason Spencer Black | 3,115 | 31.06% |
| Republican | Kimberly Butler | 3,101 | 30.92% |
| Republican | Terrance L. Irelan | 522 | 5.21% |
| Total votes | | | 100 |

==== Endorsements ====
Ben Harrison

PACs

- Alabama REALTORSPAC

Organizations

- Stand for Health Freedom

=== District 3 ===
First-term incumbent Republican representative Andrew Sorrell had represented the 3rd District since November 2018. He retired to run for state auditor. Retired United States Air Force officer Fred Joly and mayor of Tuscumbia Kerry "Bubba" Underwood ran in the Republican primary to replace Sorrell while nurse practitioner Susan Warren Bentley faced off against Mercer University alumnus and pastor Wesley Thompson in the Democratic primary. Underwood and Thompson won the Republican and Democratic primaries, respectively.

2022 Alabama House of Representatives general election, 3rd District
| Party | Candidate | Votes | % |
|---|---|---|---|
| Republican | Kerry "Bubba" Underwood | 8,023 | 65.30% |
| Democratic | Wesley Thompson | 4,241 | 34.52% |
| Write-in | | 23 | 0.18% |
| Total votes | | 12,287 | 100 |

2022 Alabama House of Representatives Republican primary election, 3rd District
| Party | Candidate | Votes | % |
|---|---|---|---|
| Republican | Kerry "Bubba" Underwood | 3,219 | 56.33% |
| Republican | Fred Joly | 2,496 | 43.67% |
| Total votes | | 5,715 | 100 |

2022 Alabama House of Representatives Democratic primary election, 3rd District
| Party | Candidate | Votes | % |
|---|---|---|---|
| Democratic | Wesley Thompson | 1,237 | 74.65% |
| Democratic | Susan Warren Bentley | 420 | 25.35% |
| Total votes | | 1,657 | 100 |

==== Endorsements ====
Kerry Underwood

PACs

- Alabama REALTORSPAC
- ForestPAC
- NFIB AlabamaPAC
- ProgressPAC
Fred Joly

Organizations

- Stand for Health Freedom
Wesley Thompson

PACs

- Persistence PAC

Unions

- AFL–CIO

=== District 4 ===
Second-term incumbent Republican representative Parker Moore had represented the 4th District since May 2018. Duncan was challenged in the Republican primary by businesswoman Shelia Banister and State Farm branch owner/operator Patrick Johnson. Johnson managed to force Moore into a runoff, but was just barely defeated. No Democrats or Libertarians filed to run for the seat, leaving Moore unopposed in the general election.

2022 Alabama House of Representatives general election, 4th District
| Party | Candidate | Votes | % |
|---|---|---|---|
| Republican | Parker Duncan Moore (incumbent) | 11,236 | 97.11% |
| Write-in | | 334 | 2.89% |
| Total votes | | 11,570 | 100% |
| Republican hold | | | |

2022 Alabama House of Representatives Republican primary runoff election, 4th District
| Party | Candidate | Votes | % |
|---|---|---|---|
| Republican | Parker Duncan Moore (incumbent) | 2,922 | 53.73% |
| Republican | Patrick Johnson | 2,516 | 46.27% |
| Total votes | | 5,438 | 100 |

2022 Alabama House of Representatives Republican primary election, 4th District
| Party | Candidate | Votes | % |
|---|---|---|---|
| Republican | Parker Duncan Moore (incumbent) | 3,041 | 43.60% |
| Republican | Patrick Johnson | 2,535 | 36.35% |
| Republican | Sheila Banister | 1,398 | 20.05% |
| Total votes | | 6,974 | 100 |

==== Endorsements ====
Parker Moore

Organizations

- Manufacture Alabama

PACs

- Alabama REALTORSPAC
- Alabama RetailPAC
- NFIB AlabamaPAC
- ProgressPAC
Patrick Johnson

PACs

- FarmPAC
Shelia Banister

Organizations

- Stand for Health Freedom

=== District 5 ===
Second-term incumbent Republican representative Danny Crawford was unopposed in the 5th district.

2022 Alabama House of Representatives general election, 5th District
| Party | Candidate | Votes | % |
|---|---|---|---|
| Republican | Danny F. Crawford | 12,332 | 98.04% |
| Write-in | | 246 | 1.96% |
| Total votes | | 12,578 | 100 |
| Republican hold | | | |

==== Endorsements ====
Danny Crawford

Organizations

- Manufacture Alabama

PACs

- Alabama REALTORSPAC
- FarmPAC
- ForestPAC
- NFIB AlabamaPAC

=== District 6 ===
First-term incumbent Republican representative Andy Whitt had represented the 6th district since 2018. Greg Turner was nominated by the Libertarian Party and contested the district in the general election.

2022 Alabama House of Representatives general election, 6th District
| Party | Candidate | Votes | % |
|---|---|---|---|
| Republican | Andy Whitt | 11,052 | 86.37% |
| Libertarian | Greg Turner | 2,597 | 20.30% |
| Write-in | | 147 | 1.15% |
| Total votes | | 12,796 | 100 |

==== Endorsements ====
Andy Whitt

Organizations

- Manufacture Alabama

PACs

- Alabama REALTORSPAC
- FarmPAC
- ForestPAC
- NFIB AlabamaPAC
Greg Turner

Unions

- AFL–CIO

=== District 7 ===
First-term incumbent Republican representative Proncey Robertson was defeated in the primary by electrical engineer Ernie Yarbrough. Lawrence County Commissioner Mose Jones Jr. and Marc Durocher were nominated by the Democratic and Libertarian parties, respectively, to challenge Yarbrough in the general election.

2022 Alabama House of Representatives general election, 7th District
| Party | Candidate | Votes | % |
|---|---|---|---|
| Republican | Ernie Yarbrough | 11,225 | 76.48% |
| Democratic | Mose Jones Jr. | 3,133 | 21.35% |
| Libertarian | Marc Durocher | 304 | 2.07% |
| Write-in | | 15 | 0.10% |
| Total votes | | 14,677 | 100 |

2022 Alabama House of Representatives Republican primary election, 7th District
| Party | Candidate | Votes | % |
|---|---|---|---|
| Republican | Ernie Yarbrough | 4,303 | 54.23% |
| Republican | Proncey Robertson (incumbent) | 3,631 | 45.77% |
| Total votes | | | 100 |

==== Endorsements ====
Ernie Yarbrough

Organizations

- Stand for Health Freedom

PACs

- Alabama REALTORSPAC
- ForestPAC
- NFIB AlabamaPAC
Proncey Robertston

Organizations

- Manufacture Alabama

PACs

- ~~Alabama REALTORSPAC~~ (switched endorsement to Yarbrough)
- Alabama RetailPAC
- FarmPAC
- ~~NFIB AlabamaPAC~~ (switched endorsement to Yarbrough)
Mose Jones, Jr.

Unions

- AFL–CIO

=== District 8 ===
Third-term incumbent Republican representative Terri Collins had represented the 8th District 2010. The Libertarian Party nominated tutor Angela Walser to contest the district in the general election.

2022 Alabama House of Representatives general election, 8th District
| Party | Candidate | Votes | % |
|---|---|---|---|
| Republican | Terri Collins | 7,234 | 84.76% |
| Libertarian | Angela Walser | 1,255 | 14.70% |
| Write-in | | 46 | 0.53% |
| Total votes | | 8,535 | 100 |

==== Endorsements ====
Terri Collins

Organizations

- Manufacture Alabama

PACs

- Alabama REALTORSPAC
- FarmPAC
- ForestPAC
- NFIB AlabamaPAC
Angela Walser

Organizations

- Alabama Cannabis Coalition

Unions

- AFL–CIO

=== District 9 ===
First-term incumbent Republican representative Scott Stadthagen had represented the 9th District since November 2018. The Libertarian Party nominated Gregory Bodine to contest the district in the general election.

2022 Alabama House of Representatives general election, 9th District
| Party | Candidate | Votes | % |
|---|---|---|---|
| Republican | Scott Stadthagen (incumbent) | 11,041 | 91.83% |
| Libertarian | Gregory Bodine | 953 | 7.93% |
| Write-in | | 29 | 0.24% |
| Total votes | | 12,023 | 100 |

==== Endorsements ====
Scott Stadthagen

Organizations

- Manufacture Alabama

PACs

- Alabama REALTORSPAC
- FarmPAC
- ForestPAC
- NFIB AlabamaPAC
- ProgressPAC
Gregory Bodine

Organizations

- Alabama Cannabis Coalition

Unions

- AFL–CIO

=== District 10 ===
Fifth-term incumbent Republican representative Mike Ball had represented the 10th District since November 2002. Ball announced his retirement in an op-ed to Yellowhammer News. Retired United States Army surgeon David Cole was nominated by the Republican Party to replace Ball. Accountant Anson Knowles initially filed to run in the primary against Cole, but was thrown off the ballot due to his activism in the Libertarian Party of Madison County. Counselor Marilyn Lands and Elijah Boyd were nominated by the Democratic and Libertarian parties, respectively, to challenge the district in the general election.

2022 Alabama House of Representatives general election, 10th District
| Party | Candidate | Votes | % |
|---|---|---|---|
| Republican | David Cole | 7,581 | 51.59% |
| Democratic | Marilyn Lands | 6,608 | 44.96% |
| Libertarian | Elijah Boyd | 503 | 3.42% |
| Write-in | | 4 | 0.03% |
| Total votes | | 14,696 | 100 |

==== Endorsements ====
David Cole

PACs

- FarmPAC
- ForestPAC
- NFIB AlabamaPAC
- ProgressPAC
Marilyn Lands

PACs

- Persistence PAC

Unions

- AFL–CIO
Elijah Boyd

Organizations

- Alabama Cannabis Coalition

=== District 11 ===
Third-term incumbent Republican representative Randall Shedd ran unopposed in the 11th district.

2022 Alabama House of Representatives general election, 11th District
| Party | Candidate | Votes | % |
|---|---|---|---|
| Republican | Randall Shedd (incumbent) | 12,552 | 99.20% |
| Write-in | | 83 | 0.80% |
| Total votes | | 12,653 | 100.0% |
| Republican hold | | | |

==== Endorsements ====
Randall Shedd

Organizations

- Manufacture Alabama

PACs

- Alabama REALTORSPAC
- FarmPAC
- NFIB AlabamaPAC

=== District 12 ===
Second-term incumbent Republican representative Corey Harbison was challenged by former state representative and perennial candidate James C. Fields in the 12th district.

2022 Alabama House of Representatives general election, 12th District
| Party | Candidate | Votes | % |
|---|---|---|---|
| Republican | Corey Harbison (incumbent) | 11,958 | 85.35% |
| Democratic | James C. Fields, Jr. | 2,030 | 14.49% |
| Write-in | | 23 | 0.16% |
| Total votes | | 14,011 | 100 |

==== Endorsements ====
Corey Harbison

PACs

- Alabama REALTORSPAC
- FarmPAC
- ForestPAC
- NFIB AlabamaPAC
- ProgressPAC
James Fields, Jr.

Unions

- AFL–CIO

=== District 13 ===
Second-term incumbent Republican representative Connie Rowe resigned her seat after being selected to serve in as a political adviser to Lieutenant Governor of Alabama Will Ainsworth. Retired advertising firm owner Greg Barnes, Walker County Commissioner Keith Davis, Jasper Police Department Lieutenant Matt Dozier, attorney at law Charlie Waits and auto dealership owner Matt Woods all ran in the primary to replace Rowe. Matt Woods cleared the field and avoided a runoff. Mark Davenport was nominated by the Libertarian Party to challenge Woods in the general election.

2022 Alabama House of Representatives general election, 13th District
| Party | Candidate | Votes | % |
|---|---|---|---|
| Republican | Matt Woods | 11,422 | 94.29% |
| Libertarian | Mark Davenport | 663 | 5.47% |
| Write-in | | 29 | 0.24% |
| Total votes | | 12,114 | 100 |

2022 Alabama House of Representatives Republican primary election, 13th District
| Party | Candidate | Votes | % |
|---|---|---|---|
| Republican | Matt Woods | 5,238 | 55.38% |
| Republican | Charlie Waits | 1,337 | 14.14% |
| Republican | Greg Barnes | 1,082 | 11.44% |
| Republican | Keith Davis | 980 | 10.36% |
| Republican | Matt Dozier | 821 | 8.68% |
| Total votes | | 9,458 | 100% |

==== Endorsements ====
Matt Woods

Organizations

- Manufacture Alabama

PACs

- Alabama REALTORSPAC
- FarmPAC
- ForestPAC
- NFIB AlabamaPAC
- ProgressPAC

Unions

- AFL–CIO

=== District 14 ===
First-term incumbent Republican representative Tim Wadsworth was challenged in the primary by Oakman mayor Cory Franks and mechanical engineer Tom Fredricks. Fredricks managed to pull Wadsworth barely into runoff territory. In the runoff, Wadsworth scored a narrow victory to keep his seat. No Libertarians or Democrats filed to run for the seat, leaving Wadsworth unopposed on the general election ballot.

2022 Alabama House of Representatives general election, 14th District
| Party | Candidate | Votes | % |
|---|---|---|---|
| Republican | Timothy "Tim" Wadsworth (incumbent) | 13,396 | 99.32% |
| Write-in | | 92 | 0.68% |
| Total votes | | 13,488 | 100.0% |
| Republican hold | | | |

2022 Alabama House of Representatives Republican primary runoff election, 14th District
| Party | Candidate | Votes | % |
|---|---|---|---|
| Republican | Timothy "Tim" Wadsworth (incumbent) | 3,739 | 55.69% |
| Republican | Tom Fredricks | 2,975 | 44.31% |
| Total votes | | 6,714 | 100 |

2022 Alabama House of Representatives Republican primary election, 14th District
| Party | Candidate | Votes | % |
|---|---|---|---|
| Republican | Timothy "Tim" Wadsworth (incumbent) | 4,907 | 47.42% |
| Republican | Tom Fredricks | 3,776 | 36.49% |
| Republican | Cory Franks | 1,664 | 16.08% |
| Total votes | | 10,347 | 100 |

==== Endorsements ====
Tim Wadsworth

PACs

- Alabama REALTORSPAC
- Alabama RetailPAC
- ForestPAC
- NFIB AlabamaPAC

Unions

- AFL–CIO

=== District 15 ===
Third-term incumbent Republican representative Allen Farley opted not to seek reelection in 2022. Helena city councilwoman Leigh Hulsey and Bessemer resident Brad Tompkins ran in the primary to replace Farley. In the primary, it was Hulsey who came out on top. The Democratic Party nominated lawyer Richard Rouco to contest the district in the general election.

2022 Alabama House of Representatives election, 15th District
| Party | Candidate | Votes | % |
|---|---|---|---|
| Republican | Leigh Hulsey | 10,818 | 63.65% |
| Democratic | Richard Rouco | 6,166 | 36.28% |
| Write-in | | 13 | 0.08% |
| Total votes | | 16,997 | 100 |

2022 Alabama House of Representatives Republican primary election, 15th District
| Party | Candidate | Votes | % |
|---|---|---|---|
| Republican | Leigh Hulsey | 3,501 | 56.68% |
| Republican | Brad Tompkins | 2,676 | 43.32% |
| Total votes | | 6,177 | 100 |

==== Endorsements ====
Leigh Hulsey

Organizations

- Stand for Health Freedom

PACs

- Alabama REALTORSPAC
- FarmPAC
- ForestPAC
- ProgressPAC
Brad Tompkins

Organizations

- Manufacture Alabama
Richard Rouco

Unions

- AFL–CIO

=== District 16 ===
Second-term incumbent Republican representative Kyle South ran unopposed in the 16th district.

2022 Alabama House of Representatives general election, 16th District
| Party | Candidate | Votes | % |
|---|---|---|---|
| Republican | Kyle South (incumbent) | 13,177 | 99.26% |
| Write-in | | 98 | 0.74% |
| Total votes | | 13,275 | 100.0% |
| Republican hold | | | |

==== Endorsements ====
Kyle South

Organizations

- Manufacture Alabama

PACs

- Alabama REALTORSPAC
- FarmPAC
- ForestPAC
- NFIB AlabamaPAC

Unions

- AFL–CIO

=== District 17 ===
First-term incumbent Republican representative Tracy Estes ran unopposed in the 17th district.

2022 Alabama House of Representatives general election, 17th District
| Party | Candidate | Votes | % |
|---|---|---|---|
| Republican | Tracy Estes (incumbent) | 12,850 | 99.39% |
| Write-in | | 79 | 0.61% |
| Total votes | | 12,929 | 100.0% |
| Republican hold | | | |

==== Endorsements ====
Tracy Estes

Organizations

- Manufacture Alabama

PACS

- Alabama REALTORSPAC
- FarmPAC
- ForestPAC
- NFIB AlabamaPAC
- ProgressPAC

=== District 18 ===
First-term incumbent Republican representative Jamie Kiel ran for reelection in the 18th district. The Libertarian Party nominated Talia Shimp to challenge Kiel in the general election.

2022 Alabama House of Representatives general election, 18th District
| Party | Candidate | Votes | % |
|---|---|---|---|
| Republican | Jamie Kiel (incumbent) | 10,783 | 94.85% |
| Libertarian | Talia Shimp | 571 | 5.02% |
| Write-in | | 14 | 0.12% |
| Total votes | | 11,368 | 100 |

==== Endorsements ====
Jamie Kiel

Organizations

- Manufacture Alabama

PACs

- Alabama REALTORSPAC
- FarmPAC
- ForestPAC
- NFIB AlabamaPAC
- ProgressPAC
Talia Shimp

Organizations

- Alabama Cannabis Coalition

Unions

- AFL–CIO

=== District 19 ===
Eighth-term incumbent Democratic representative Laura Hall ran unopposed in the 19th district.

2022 Alabama House of Representatives general election, 19th District
| Party | Candidate | Votes | % |
|---|---|---|---|
| Democratic | Laura Hall (incumbent) | 8,721 | 96.44% |
| Write-in | | 322 | 3.56% |
| Total votes | | 9,043 | 100.0% |
| Democratic hold | | | |

==== Endorsements ====
Laura Hall

Organizations

- Manufacture Alabama

PACs

- Alabama REALTORSPAC
- FarmPAC
- ForestPAC

Unions

- AFL–CIO

=== District 20 ===
Ninth-term incumbent Republican representative Howard Sanderford opted not to seek reelection in 2022. Progress Bank Chief Risk Officer James Brown, commercial real estate broker James Lomax, lawyer Angela McClure, and defense contractor Frances Taylor all ran in the primary to replace Sanderford. No candidate gained the needed majority of the vote, so Lomax and Taylor advanced to a runoff. Lomax scored a victory in the runoff. No Democrats or Libertarians filed to run for the seat, leaving Lomax unopposed in the general election.

2022 Alabama House of Representatives general election, 20th District
| Party | Candidate | Votes | % |
|---|---|---|---|
| Republican | James Lomax | 14,816 | 97.63% |
| Write-in | | 359 | 2.37% |
| Total votes | | 15,175 | 100.0% |
| Republican hold | | | |

2022 Alabama House of Representatives Republican Primary runoff, 20th District
| Party | Candidate | Votes | % |
|---|---|---|---|
| Republican | James Lomax | 5,385 | 63.18% |
| Republican | Frances Taylor | 3,138 | 36.82% |
| Total votes | | 8,523 | 100 |

2022 Alabama House of Representatives Republican Primary, 20th District
| Party | Candidate | Votes | % |
|---|---|---|---|
| Republican | James Lomax | 3,765 | 43.95% |
| Republican | Frances Taylor | 2,203 | 26.03% |
| Republican | Angela McClure | 1,409 | 16.45% |
| Republican | James D. Brown | 1,162 | 13.57% |
| Total votes | | 8,566 | 100 |

==== Endorsements ====
James Lomax

PACs

- Alabama REALTORSPAC
- FarmPAC
- ForestPAC
- NFIB AlabamaPAC
- ProgressPAC

=== District 21 ===
Second-term incumbent Republican representative Rex Reynolds ran unopposed in the 21st district.

2022 Alabama House of Representatives general election, 21st District
| Party | Candidate | Votes | % |
|---|---|---|---|
| Republican | Rex Reynolds (incumbent) | 12,386 | 95.95% |
| Write-in | | 523 | 4.05% |
| Total votes | | 12,909 | 100 |
| Republican hold | | | |

==== Endorsements ====
Rex Reynolds

Organizations

- Manufacture Alabama

PACs

- Alabama REALTORSPAC
- FarmPAC
- ForestPAC
- NFIB AlabamaPAC

=== District 22 ===
Second-term incumbent Republican representative Ritchie Whorton ran unopposed in the 22nd district.

2022 Alabama House of Representatives general election, 22nd District
| Party | Candidate | Votes | % |
|---|---|---|---|
| Republican | Ritchie Whorton (incumbent) | 12,984 | 98.08% |
| Write-in | | 254 | 1.92% |
| Total votes | | 13,238 | 100 |
| Republican hold | | | |

==== Endorsements ====
Ritchie Whorton

PACs

- Alabama REALTORSPAC
- ForestPAC
- NFIB AlabamaPAC

=== District 23 ===
Second-term incumbent Republican representative Tommy Hanes was primaried by Vulcan Materials operations manager Mike Kirkland. No Libertarians or Democrats filed to run for the seat, leaving Kirkland unopposed in the general election.

2022 Alabama House of Representatives general election, 23rd District
| Party | Candidate | Votes | % |
|---|---|---|---|
| Republican | Mike Kirkland | 10,980 | 97.11% |
| Write-in | | 327 | 2.89% |
| Total votes | | 11,307 | 100 |
| Republican hold | | | |

2022 Alabama House of Representatives Republican primary election, 23rd District
| Party | Candidate | Votes | % |
|---|---|---|---|
| Republican | Mike Kirkland | 3,953 | 51.60% |
| Republican | Tommy Hanes (incumbent) | 3,708 | 48.40% |
| Total votes | | 7,661 | 100 |

==== Endorsements ====
Tommy Hanes

Organizations

- Stand for Health Freedom

PACs

- ~~Alabama REALTORSPAC~~ (switched endorsement to Kirkland)
- ~~NFIB AlabamaPAC~~ (switched endorsement to Kirkland)
Mike Kirkland

PACs

- Alabama REALTORSPAC
- Alabama RetailPAC
- FarmPAC
- ForestPAC
- NFIB AlabamaPAC
- ProgressPAC

=== District 24 ===
Alabama House of Representatives Majority Leader Nathaniel Ledbetter swept aside token opposition from computer scientist and business owner Don Stout. No Libertarians or Democrats filed to run for the seat, leaving Ledbetter unopposed in the general election. Democratic primary and general election were canceled because the Republican candidate was the only candidate in the general election.

2022 Alabama House of Representatives general election, 24th District
| Party | Candidate | Votes | % |
|---|---|---|---|
| Republican | Nathaniel Ledbetter (incumbent) | 11,285 | 99.23% |
| Write-in | | 87 | 0.77% |
| Total votes | | | 100 |
| Republican hold | | | |

2022 Alabama House of Representatives Republican primary election, 24th District
| Party | Candidate | Votes | % |
|---|---|---|---|
| Republican | Nathaniel Ledbetter (incumbent) | 6,231 | 68.28% |
| Republican | Don Stout | 2,894 | 31.72% |
| Total votes | | 9,125 | 100 |

==== Endorsements ====
Nathaniel Ledbetter

Organizations

- Manufacture Alabama

PACs

- Alabama REALTORSPAC
- Alabama RetailPAC
- FarmPAC
- ForestPAC
- NFIB AlabamaPAC

Unions

- AFL–CIO
Don Stout

Organizations

- Stand for Health Freedom

=== District 25 ===
Fourth-term incumbent Republican representative and Speaker of the Alabama House of Representatives Mac McCutcheon announced his retirement at the conclusion of the 2022 legislative session. Retired United States Army helicopter pilot Buck Clemons and pharmacist Phillip Rigsby ran in the primary to replace McCutcheon. Rigsby annihilated Clemons in the primary. Former Miss America Mallory Hagan was nominated by the Democratic Party to contest the district in the general election.

2022 Alabama House of Representatives general election, 25th District
| Party | Candidate | Votes | % |
|---|---|---|---|
| Republican | Phillip K. Rigsby | 10,813 | 57.87% |
| Democratic | Mallory Hagan | 7,837 | 41.95% |
| Write-in | | 33 | 0.18% |
| Total votes | | 18,683 | 100 |

2022 Alabama House of Representatives Republican primary election, 25th District
| Party | Candidate | Votes | % |
|---|---|---|---|
| Republican | Buck Clemons | 1,799 | 29.42% |
| Republican | Phillip K. Rigsby | 4,316 | 70.58% |
| Total votes | | 6,115 | 100 |

==== Endorsements ====
Phillip Rigsby

PACs

- ForestPAC
- NFIB AlabamaPAC
- ProgressPAC
Mallory Hagan

Individuals

- Anthony Daniels, Member of the Alabama House of Representatives from the 53rd District (Huntsville, 2014-present) and Minority Leader of the Alabama House of Representatives (2017-present)
- Neil Rafferty, Member of the Alabama House of Representatives from the 54th District (Birmingham, 2018-present)

PACs

- Persistence PAC

Unions

- AFL–CIO

=== District 26 ===
Third-term incumbent Republican representative Kerry Rich announced he would not seek reelection in 2022. Financial planner Brock Colvin, nurse Annette Holcomb, and businessman Todd Mitchem all ran in the primary to replace Rich. Colvin won the primary outright to represent the Republican Party in the general election. Pastor Ben Alford was nominated by the Democratic Party to contest the district in the general election.

2022 Alabama House of Representatives general election, 26th District
| Party | Candidate | Votes | % |
|---|---|---|---|
| Republican | Brock Colvin | 8,258 | 88.36% |
| Democratic | Ben Alford | 1,078 | 11.53% |
| Write-in | | 10 | 0.11% |
| Total votes | | 9,346 | 100 |

2022 Alabama House of Representatives Republican primary election, 26th District
| Party | Candidate | Votes | % |
|---|---|---|---|
| Republican | Brock Colvin | 3,022 | 54.95% |
| Republican | Annette Holcomb | 1,288 | 23.42% |
| Republican | Todd Mitchem | 1,190 | 21.64% |
| Total votes | | | 100 |

==== Endorsements ====
Brock Colvin

Organizations

- Manufacture Alabama

PACs

- Alabama REALTORSPAC
- FarmPAC
- ForestPAC
- NFIB AlabamaPAC
- ProgressPAC
Todd Mitchem

Organizations

- Stand for Health Freedom
Ben Alford

Unions

- AFL–CIO

=== District 27 ===
First-term incumbent Republican representative Wes Kitchens ran for reelection in the 27th district against Democratic nominee and publisher Herb Neu.

2022 Alabama House of Representatives general election, 27th District
| Party | Candidate | Votes | % |
|---|---|---|---|
| Republican | Wes Kitchens (incumbent) | 13,150 | 89.17% |
| Democratic | Herb Neu | 1,583 | 10,73% |
| Write-in | | 14 | 0.10% |
| Total votes | | | 100 |

==== Endorsements ====
Wes Kitchens

Organizations

- Manufacture Alabama

PACs

- Alabama REALTORSPAC
- FarmPAC
- ForestPAC
- NFIB AlabamaPAC
Herb Neu

Unions

- AFL–CIO

=== District 28 ===
First-term incumbent Republican representative Gil Isbell was primaried by the former holder of this seat, Mack Butler. No Libertarians or Democrats filed to run for the seat, leaving Butler unopposed on the general election ballot. Controversy arose from this election as some voters in this district were accidentally assigned to District 29, and vice versa. This oversight was acknowledged by Etowah County Probate Judge Scott Hassell.

2022 Alabama House of Representatives election, 28th District
| Party | Candidate | Votes | % |
|---|---|---|---|
| Republican | Mack Butler | 6,566 | 95.77% |
| Write-in | | 290 | 4.23% |
| Total votes | | 6,856 | 100 |
| Republican hold | | | |

2022 Alabama House of Representatives Republican primary election, 28th District
| Party | Candidate | Votes | % |
|---|---|---|---|
| Republican | Mack Butler | 2,684 | 52.13% |
| Republican | Gil Isbell (incumbent) | 2,465 | 47.87% |
| Total votes | | 5,149 | 100 |

==== Endorsements ====
Mack Butler

Organizations

- Stand for Health Freedom

PACs

- Alabama REALTORSPAC
- ForestPAC
Gil Isbell

Organizations

- Manufacture Alabama

PACs

- ~~Alabama REALTORSPAC~~ (switched endorsement to Butler)
- Alabama RetailPAC
- FarmPAC
- NFIB AlabamaPAC

=== District 29 ===
Third-term incumbent Republican representative Becky Nordgren resigned her seat in 2021 after being elected Revenue Commissioner of Etowah County. County Commissioner Jamie Grant and preacher Mark Gidley ran in the primary to replace Nordgren. Gidley only won the primary by 74 votes, and an error made by the county in correctly assigning voters between Districts 28 and 29 caused Grant to not immediately concede the election. However, Gidley was still certified as the winner. Clifford Foy Valentin was nominated by the Libertarian Party to contest the district in the general election.

2022 Alabama House of Representatives general election, 29th District
| Party | Candidate | Votes | % |
|---|---|---|---|
| Republican | Mark A. Gidley | 12,612 | 93.94% |
| Libertarian | Clifford Foy Valentin | 779 | 5.80% |
| Write-in | | 35 | 0.26% |
| Total votes | | 13,426 | 100 |

2022 Alabama House of Representatives Republican primary election, 29th District
| Party | Candidate | Votes | % |
|---|---|---|---|
| Republican | Mark A. Gidley | 4,014 | 50.47% |
| Republican | Jamie W. Grant | 3,940 | 49.53% |
| Total votes | | 7,954 | 100 |

==== Endorsements ====
Mark Gidley

PACs

- Alabama REALTORSPAC
- ForestPAC
- ProgressPAC
Jamie Grant

Organizations

- Manufacture Alabama

PACs

- ~~Alabama REALTORSPAC~~ (switched endorsement to Gidley)
- ProgressPAC
Clifford Valentin

Unions

- AFL–CIO

=== District 30 ===
First-term incumbent Republican representative Craig Lipscomb ran unopposed in the 30th district.

2022 Alabama House of Representatives general election, 30th District
| Party | Candidate | Votes | % |
|---|---|---|---|
| Republican | Craig Lipscomb (incumbent) | 12,325 | 99.26% |
| Write-in | | 92 | 0.74% |
| Total votes | | 12,417 | 100 |
| Republican hold | | | |

==== Endorsements ====
Craig Lipscomb

Organizations

- Manufacture Alabama

PACs

- Alabama REALTORSPAC
- ForestPAC
- NFIB AlabamaPAC

=== District 31 ===
Third-term incumbent Republican representative Mike Holmes announced he would not run for reelection in 2022. Cybersecurity specialist Chadwick Smith and Elmore County Commission Chairman Troy Stubbs both ran in the primary to replace Holmes, with Stubbs gaining about two-thirds of the vote. No Libertarians or Democrats filed to run for the seat, leaving Stubbs unopposed on the general election ballot.

2022 Alabama House of Representatives general election, 31st District
| Party | Candidate | Votes | % |
|---|---|---|---|
| Republican | Troy B. Stubbs | 11,418 | 98.81% |
| Write-in | | 138 | 1.19% |
| Total votes | | 11,556 | 100 |
| Republican hold | | | |

2022 Alabama House of Representatives Republican primary election, 31st District
| Party | Candidate | Votes | % |
|---|---|---|---|
| Republican | Troy B. Stubbs | 4,731 | 66.85% |
| Republican | Chadwick Smith | 2,346 | 33.15% |
| Total votes | | 7,077 | 100 |

==== Endorsements ====
Troy Stubbs

PACs

- Alabama REALTORSPAC
- FarmPAC
- NFIB AlabamaPAC
- ProgressPAC

=== District 32 ===
Eighth-term incumbent Democratic representative Barbara Boyd was challenged by Republican nominee Evan Jackson in the 32nd district.

2022 Alabama House of Representatives general election, 32nd District
| Party | Candidate | Votes | % |
|---|---|---|---|
| Democratic | Barbara Boyd (incumbent) | 5,522 | 55.66% |
| Republican | Evan Jackson | 4,390 | 44.25% |
| Write-in | | 9 | 0.09% |
| Total votes | | 9,921 | 100 |

==== Endorsements ====
Evan Jackson

Organizations

- Alabama Minority GOP

PACs

- ForestPAC
Barbara Boyd

Organizations

- Manufacture Alabama

PACs

- Alabama REALTORSPAC
- ProgressPAC

Unions

- AFL–CIO

=== District 33 ===
Ben Robbins ran for his first full term after succeeding the late Ronald Johnson in a special election. The Democratic Party nominated Kappa Alpha Psi fundraising consultant Fred Crum to challenge Robbins in the general election.

2022 Alabama House of Representatives general election, 33rd District
| Party | Candidate | Votes | % |
|---|---|---|---|
| Republican | Ben Robbins (incumbent) | 9,534 | 72.68% |
| Democratic | Fred Crum, Sr. | 3,571 | 27.22% |
| Write-in | | 13 | 0.10% |
| Total votes | | 13,118 | 100 |

==== Endorsements ====
Ben Robbins

Organizations

- Manufacture Alabama

PACS

- Alabama REALTORSPAC
- FarmPAC
- ForestPAC
- NFIB AlabamaPAC
Fred Crum

Unions

- AFL–CIO

=== District 34 ===
Third-term incumbent Republican representative David Standridge ran unopposed in the 34th district.

2022 Alabama House of Representatives general election, 34th District
| Party | Candidate | Votes | % |
|---|---|---|---|
| Republican | David Standridge (incumbent) | 12,222 | 99.32% |
| Write-in | | 84 | 0.68% |
| Total votes | | 12,306 | 100 |
| Republican hold | | | |

==== Endorsements ====
David Standridge

Organizations

- Manufacture Alabama

PACs

- Alabama REALTORSPAC
- FarmPAC
- ForestPAC
- NFIB AlabamaPAC
- ProgressPAC

Unions

- AFL–CIO

=== District 35 ===
Seventh-term incumbent Republican representative Steve Hurst ran unopposed in the 35th district.

2022 Alabama House of Representatives general election, 35th District
| Party | Candidate | Votes | % |
|---|---|---|---|
| Republican | Steve Hurst (incumbent) | 10,880 | 98.66% |
| Write-in | | 148 | 1.34% |
| Total votes | | 11,028 | 100 |
| Republican hold | | | |

==== Endorsements ====
Steve Hurst

Organizations

- Manufacture Alabama

PACs

- Alabama REALTORSPAC
- FarmPAC
- ForestPAC
- NFIB AlabamaPAC

Unions

- AFL–CIO

=== District 36 ===
Sixth-term incumbent Republican representative Randy Wood ran unopposed in the 36th district.

2022 Alabama House of Representatives general election, 36th District
| Party | Candidate | Votes | % |
|---|---|---|---|
| Republican | Randy Wood (incumbent) | 12,449 | 98.19% |
| Write-in | | 230 | 1.81% |
| Total votes | | 12,679 | 100 |
| Republican hold | | | |

==== Endorsements ====
Randy Wood

Organizations

- Manufacture Alabama

PACs

- Alabama REALTORSPAC
- ForestPAC
- NFIB AlabamaPAC

=== District 37 ===
Second-term incumbent Republican representative Bob Fincher ran unopposed in the 37th district.

2022 Alabama House of Representatives general election, 37th District
| Party | Candidate | Votes | % |
|---|---|---|---|
| Republican | Bob Fincher (incumbent) | 11,937 | 98.73% |
| Write-in | | 154 | 1.27% |
| Total votes | | 12,091 | 100 |
| Republican hold | | | |

==== Endorsements ====
Bob Fincher

PACs

- Alabama REALTORSPAC
- FarmPAC
- ForestPAC
- NFIB AlabamaPAC

=== District 38 ===
First-term incumbent Republican representative Debbie Wood was challenged in the primary by Alabama National Guard officer Micah Messer. Wood narrowly won the primary to keep her seat. Charles A. Temm Jr. was nominated by the Libertarian Party to contest the district in the general election.

2022 Alabama House of Representatives general election, 38th District
| Party | Candidate | Votes | % |
|---|---|---|---|
| Republican | Debbie Hamby Wood (incumbent) | 9,162 | 88.01% |
| Libertarian | Charles A. Temm, Jr. | 1,161 | 11.15% |
| Write-in | | 87 | 0.84% |
| Total votes | | 10,410 | 100 |

2022 Alabama House of Representatives Republican primary election, 38th District
| Party | Candidate | Votes | % |
|---|---|---|---|
| Republican | Debbie Hamby Wood (incumbent) | 3,074 | 57.08% |
| Republican | Micah J. Messer | 2,311 | 42.92% |
| Total votes | | 5,385 | 100 |

==== Endorsements ====
Debbie Hamby Wood

Organizations

- Manufacture Alabama

PACs

- Alabama REALTORSPAC
- Alabama RetailPAC
- FarmPAC
- ForestPAC
- NFIB AlabamaPAC
Micah Messer

Organizations

- Stand for Health Freedom
Charles Temm, Jr.

Unions

- AFL–CIO

=== District 39 ===
First-term incumbent Republican representative Ginny Shaver was challenged by Brent Rhodes in the primary. Shaver demolished Rhodes in the primary. No Libertarians or Democrats filed to run for the seat, leaving Shaver unopposed in the general election. Democratic primary and general election were canceled because the Republican candidate was the only candidate in the general election.

2022 Alabama House of Representatives general election, 39th District
| Party | Candidate | Votes | % |
|---|---|---|---|
| Republican | Ginny Shaver (incumbent) | 11,224 | 98.99% |
| Write-in | | 114 | 1.01% |
| Total votes | | 11,338 | 100 |
| Republican hold | | | |

2022 Alabama House of Representatives Republican primary election, 39th District
| Party | Candidate | Votes | % |
|---|---|---|---|
| Republican | Ginny Shaver (incumbent) | 5,344 | 71.34% |
| Republican | Brent Rhodes | 2,147 | 28.66% |
| Total votes | | 7,491 | 100 |

==== Endorsements ====
Ginny Shaver

Organizations

- Manufacture Alabama

PACs

- Alabama REALTORSPAC
- Alabama RetailPAC
- FarmPAC
- ForestPAC
- NFIB AlabamaPAC

=== District 40 ===
Fourth-term incumbent Republican representative K. L. Brown announced he would not seek reelection in 2022. Teacher Gayla Blanton, Anniston finance director Julie Borrelli, magazine owner Katie Exum, Jacksonville State University professor Bill Lester, general contractor Bill McAdams, United States Navy veteran Chad Robertson and University of Alabama student Jakob Williamson all crowded in the primary to replace Brown. However, none of them exceeded a quarter of the vote, forcing Borrelli and Robertson into a runoff. In the runoff, Robertson squeaked to a razor-thin 19 vote victory. The Democratic Party nominated Jacksonville resident Pam Howard to run against Robertson in the general election.

2022 Alabama House of Representatives general election, 40th District
| Party | Candidate | Votes | % |
|---|---|---|---|
| Republican | Chad Robertson | 10,772 | 82.84% |
| Democratic | Pam Howard | 2,221 | 17.08% |
| Write-in | | 10 | 0.08% |
| Total votes | | 13,003 | 100 |

2022 Alabama House of Representatives Republican primary runoff election, 40th District
| Party | Candidate | Votes | % |
|---|---|---|---|
| Republican | Chad Robertson | 2,383 | 50.20% |
| Republican | Julie Borrelli | 2,364 | 49.80% |
| Total votes | | 4,747 | 100 |

2022 Alabama House of Representatives Republican primary election, 40th District
| Party | Candidate | Votes | % |
|---|---|---|---|
| Republican | Chad Robertson | 1,703 | 22.23% |
| Republican | Julie Borrelli | 1,553 | 20.27% |
| Republican | Katie Exum | 1,414 | 18.46% |
| Republican | Bill Lester | 1,317 | 17.19% |
| Republican | Bill McAdams | 1,007 | 13.15% |
| Republican | Gayla Blanton | 574 | 7.49% |
| Republican | Jakob Williamson | 92 | 1.20% |
| Total votes | | 7,660 | 100 |

==== Endorsements ====
Chad Robertson

PACs

- Alabama REALTORSPAC
- ForestPAC
- ProgressPAC
Bill Lester

Individuals

- K. L. Brown

Organizations

- Stand for Health Freedom
Bill McAdams

PACs

- FarmPAC
Pam Howard

PACs

- Persistence PAC

Unions

- AFL–CIO

=== District 41 ===
Second-term incumbent Republican representative Corley Ellis ran against Democratic and Libertarian challengers Chris Nelson and Matthew Gregory Morris Jr. respectively.

2022 Alabama House of Representatives general election, 41st District
| Party | Candidate | Votes | % |
|---|---|---|---|
| Republican | Corley Ellis (incumbent) | 10,897 | 74.99% |
| Democratic | Chris Nelson | 3,203 | 22.04% |
| Libertarian | Matthew Gregory Morris, Jr. | 418 | 2.88% |
| Write-in | | 14 | 0.10% |
| Total votes | | 14,532 | 100 |

==== Endorsements ====
Corley Ellis

Organizations

- Manufacture Alabama

PACs

- Alabama REALTORSPAC
- FarmPAC
- ForestPAC
- NFIB AlabamaPAC
Chris Nelson

Unions

- AFL–CIO
Matthew Gregory Morris, Jr.

Organizations

- Alabama Cannabis Coalition

=== District 42 ===
Ivan Smith ran for his first full term in the House after succeeding Jimmy Martin in a special election. The Libertarian Party nominated Doug Ward to challenge Smith in the general election.

2022 Alabama House of Representatives general election, 42nd District
| Party | Candidate | Votes | % |
|---|---|---|---|
| Republican | Ivan "Van" Smith (incumbent) | 12,336 | 92.75% |
| Libertarian | Doug Ward | 931 | 7.00% |
| Write-in | | 33 | 0.25 |
| Total votes | | 13,300 | 100 |

==== Endorsements ====
Van Smith

Organizations

- Manufacture Alabama

PACs

- Alabama REALTORSPAC
- FarmPAC
- NFIB AlabamaPAC
Doug Ward

Organizations

- Alabama Cannabis Coalition
- LetBamaVote.org

Unions

- AFL–CIO

=== District 43 ===
Second-term incumbent Republican representative Arnold Mooney was challenged by community organizer Prince Cleveland and Jason Newell Davis Burr for District 43's seat.

2022 Alabama House of Representatives general election, 43rd District
| Party | Candidate | Votes | % |
|---|---|---|---|
| Republican | Arnold Mooney (incumbent) | 12,751 | 74.28% |
| Democratic | Prince Cleveland | 3,760 | 21.91% |
| Libertarian | Jason Newell Davis Burr | 644 | 3.75% |
| Write-in | | 10 | 0.06% |
| Total votes | | 17,165 | 100 |

==== Endorsements ====
Arnold Mooney

Organizations

- Manufacture Alabama

PACs

- Alabama REALTORSPAC
- FarmPAC
- ForestPAC
- NFIB AlabamaPAC
- ProgressPAC
Prince Cleveland

Unions

- AFL–CIO
Jason Newell Davis Burr

Organizations

- Alabama Cannabis Coalition
- LetBamaVote.org

=== District 44 ===
Second-term incumbent Republican representative Danny Garrett ran for reelection against Libertarian nominee John Wiley Boone.

2022 Alabama House of Representatives general election, 44th District
| Party | Candidate | Votes | % |
|---|---|---|---|
| Republican | Danny Garrett (incumbent) | 11,396 | 83.84% |
| Libertarian | John Wiley Boone | 2,088 | 15.36% |
| Write-in | | 108 | 0.79% |
| Total votes | | 13,592 | 100 |

==== Endorsements ====
Danny Garrett

Organizations

- Manufacture Alabama

PACs

- Alabama REALTORSPAC
- FarmPAC
- ForestPAC
- NFIB AlabamaPAC
John Wiley Boone

Unions

- AFL–CIO

=== District 45 ===
Third-term incumbent Republican representative Dickie Drake was annihilated by banker Susan DuBose. The Libertarian Party nominated Kari Mitchell Whitaker to face DuBose in the general election.

2022 Alabama House of Representatives general election, 45th District
| Party | Candidate | Votes | % |
|---|---|---|---|
| Republican | Susan DuBose | 12,060 | 85.56% |
| Libertarian | Kari Mitchell Whitaker | 1,950 | 13.83% |
| Write-in | | 86 | 0.61% |
| Total votes | | 14,096 | 100 |

2022 Alabama House of Representatives Republican primary election, 45th District
| Party | Candidate | Votes | % |
|---|---|---|---|
| Republican | Dickie Drake (incumbent) | 2,486 | 32.78% |
| Republican | Susan DuBose | 5,099 | 67.22% |
| Total votes | | 7,585 | 100 |

==== Endorsements ====
Susan DuBose

Organizations

- Stand for Health Freedom

PACs

- Alabama REALTORSPAC
- ForestPAC
- NFIB AlabamaPAC
- ProgressPAC
Dickie Drake

Organizations

- Manufacture Alabama

PACs

- ~~Alabama REALTORSPAC~~ (switched endorsement to DuBose)
- Alabama RetailPAC
- ~~NFIB AlabamaPAC~~ (switched endorsement to DuBose)
Kari Mitchell Whitaker

Organizations

- Alabama Cannabis Coalition

Unions

- AFL–CIO

=== District 46 ===
Second-term incumbent Republican representative David Faulkner ran unopposed in the 46th district.

2022 Alabama House of Representatives general election, 46th District
| Party | Candidate | Votes | % |
|---|---|---|---|
| Republican | David Faulkner (incumbent) | | |
| Write-in | | | |
| Total votes | | | 100 |
| Republican hold | | | |

==== Endorsements ====
David Faulkner

Organizations

- Manufacture Alabama

PACs

- Alabama REALTORSPAC
- FarmPAC
- ForestPAC
- NFIB AlabamaPAC

=== District 47 ===
First-term incumbent Republican representative David Wheeler died in office in March 2022. The Republican Party nominated Hoover city councilman Mike Shaw to succeed Wheeler through a closed nomination process. Alabama National Guard member Christian Coleman and perennial candidate Jim Toomey ran in the Democratic primary to challenge Shaw. Coleman won the primary by a whopping 5 votes to gain his party's nomination.

2022 Alabama House of Representatives general election, 47th District
| Party | Candidate | Votes | % |
|---|---|---|---|
| Republican | Mike Shaw | | |
| Democratic | Christian Coleman | | |
| Write-in | | | |
| Total votes | | | 100 |

2022 Alabama House of Representatives Democratic primary election, 47th District
| Party | Candidate | Votes | % |
|---|---|---|---|
| Democratic | Christian Coleman | 601 | 50.21% |
| Democratic | Jim Toomey | 596 | 49.79% |
| Total votes | | 1,197 | 100 |

==== Endorsements ====
Mike Shaw

PACs

- Alabama REALTORSPAC
- NFIB AlabamaPAC
- ProgressPAC
Christian Coleman

Unions

- AFL–CIO

=== District 48 ===
Third-term incumbent Republican representative Jim Carns was challenged by marketing director William Wentowski in the primary. Carns wiped the floor with Wentowski and went on to face Libertarian nominee Bruce Stutts in the general election.

2022 Alabama House of Representatives general election, 48th District
| Party | Candidate | Votes | % |
|---|---|---|---|
| Republican | Jim Carns (incumbent) | 12,518 | 84.66% |
| Libertarian | Bruce Stutts | 2,184 | 14.77% |
| Write-in | | 84 | 0.57% |
| Total votes | | 14,786 | 100 |

2022 Alabama House of Representatives Republican primary election, 48th District
| Party | Candidate | Votes | % |
|---|---|---|---|
| Republican | Jim Carns (incumbent) | 5,207 | 70.14% |
| Republican | William Wentowski | 2,217 | 29.86% |
| Total votes | | 7,424 | 100 |

==== Endorsements ====
Jim Carns

Organizations

- Manufacture Alabama

PACs

- Alabama REALTORSPAC
- Alabama RetailPAC
- ForestPAC
- NFIB AlabamaPAC
- ProgressPAC
Bruce Stutts

Unions

- AFL–CIO

=== District 49 ===
Second-term incumbent Republican representative April Weaver resigned her seat in 2020. Incumbent Russell Bedsole demolished talk radio host Michael Hart in the primary and ran unopposed in the general election.

2022 Alabama House of Representatives general election, 49th District
| Party | Candidate | Votes | % |
|---|---|---|---|
| Republican | Russell Bedsole (incumbent) | | |
| Write-in | | | |
| Total votes | | | 100 |
| Republican hold | | | |

2022 Alabama House of Representatives Republican primary election, 49th District
| Party | Candidate | Votes | % |
|---|---|---|---|
| Republican | Russell Bedsole (incumbent) | 4,492 | 72.90% |
| Republican | Michael Hart | 1,670 | 27.10% |
| Total votes | | 6,162 | 100 |

==== Endorsements ====
Russell Bedsole

Organizations

- Manufacture Alabama

PACs

- Alabama REALTORSPAC
- ForestPAC
- NFIB AlabamaPAC
Michael Hart

Organizations

- Stand for Health Freedom

=== District 50 ===
Third-term incumbent Republican representative Jim Hill ran unopposed in the 50th district.

2022 Alabama House of Representatives general election, 50th District
| Party | Candidate | Votes | % |
|---|---|---|---|
| Republican | Jim Hill (incumbent) | | |
| Write-in | | | |
| Total votes | | | 100 |
| Republican hold | | | |

==== Endorsements ====
Jim Hill

Organizations

- Manufacture Alabama

PACs

- Alabama REALTORSPAC
- ForestPAC
- NFIB AlabamaPAC

=== District 51 ===
Fourth-term incumbent Republican representative Allen Treadaway ran unopposed in the 51st district.

2022 Alabama House of Representatives general election, 51st District
| Party | Candidate | Votes | % |
|---|---|---|---|
| Republican | Allen Treadaway (incumbent) | | |
| Write-in | | | |
| Total votes | | | 100 |
| Republican hold | | | |

==== Endorsements ====
Allen Treadaway

Organizations

- Manufacture Alabama

PACs

- Alabama REALTORSPAC
- NFIB AlabamaPAC

=== District 52 ===
40-year incumbent John Rogers was challenged in the primary by Western Kentucky University alumna LaTanya Millhouse in the primary. Rogers won the primary in convincing fashion and went unopposed in the general election.

2022 Alabama House of Representatives general election, 52nd District
| Party | Candidate | Votes | % |
|---|---|---|---|
| Democratic | John W. Rogers, Jr. (incumbent) | | |
| Write-in | | | |
| Total votes | | | 100 |
| Democratic hold | | | |

2022 Alabama House of Representatives Democratic primary election, 52nd District
| Party | Candidate | Votes | % |
|---|---|---|---|
| Democratic | John W. Rogers, Jr. (incumbent) | 3,362 | 67.09% |
| Democratic | LaTanya Millhouse | 1,649 | 32.91% |
| Total votes | | 5,011 | 100 |

==== Endorsements ====
John W. Rogers, Jr.

PACs

- Alabama REALTORSPAC
- Alabama RetailPAC

Unions

- AFL–CIO

=== District 53 ===
Alabama House of Representatives Minority Leader Anthony Daniels ran unopposed in the 53rd district.

2022 Alabama House of Representatives general election, 53rd District
| Party | Candidate | Votes | % |
|---|---|---|---|
| Democratic | Anthony Daniels (incumbent) | | |
| Write-in | | | |
| Total votes | | | 100 |
| Democratic hold | | | |

==== Endorsements ====
Anthony Daniels

Organizations

- Manufacture Alabama

PACs

- Alabama REALTORSPAC
- FarmPAC
- ForestPAC

Unions

- AFL–CIO

=== District 54 ===
First-term incumbent Democratic representative Neil Rafferty was challenged by community organizer Brit Blalock and barber shop owner Edward Maddox in the primary, but Rafferty managed to gain enough votes to avoid a runoff. No Republicans or Libertarians filed to run for the seat, leaving Rafferty unopposed in the general election.

2022 Alabama House of Representatives general election, 54th District
| Party | Candidate | Votes | % |
|---|---|---|---|
| Democratic | Neil Rafferty (incumbent) | | |
| Write-in | | | |
| Total votes | | | 100 |
| Democratic hold | | | |

2022 Alabama House of Representatives Democratic primary election, 54th District
| Party | Candidate | Votes | % |
|---|---|---|---|
| Democratic | Neil Rafferty (incumbent) | 2,719 | 58.70% |
| Democratic | Brit Blalock | 502 | 10.84% |
| Democratic | Edward Maddox | 1,411 | 30.46% |
| Total votes | | 4,632 | 100 |

==== Endorsements ====
Neil Rafferty

Organizations

- Alabama Cannabis Coalition

PACs

- Alabama REALTORSPAC
- Alabama RetailPAC
- ProgressPAC

Unions

- AFL–CIO

=== District 55 ===
Fifth-term incumbent Democratic representative Rod Scott represented the 55th District since 2006. Birmingham Police Department Sergeant Travis Hendrix, Fairfield city councilwoman Phyllis Oden-Jones, United States Army veteran Fred "Coach" Plump and perennial candidate Antwon Bernard Womack all challenged Scott in the primary. No candidate gained the needed majority of votes to declare victory, so Plump and Scott advanced to a runoff. In the runoff, Plump defeated incumbent Scott by a razor-thin 33 vote margin to oust incumbent Scott and gain his party's nomination. Following the runoff, Scott requested a recount to be held at the headquarters of the Jefferson County Democratic Party, but the recount only reaffirmed Plump's victory. No Libertarians or Republicans filed to run for the seat, leaving Plump unopposed in the general election.

Primary results by precinct (left), including provisional (top right) and absentee (bottom right) ballot precincts. Scott: 20-30%; 30-40%; 60-70%; Plump: 30-40%; 70-80%; Oden-Jones: 20-30%; 30-40%; 40-50%; Hendrix: 30-40%; 40-50%; Womack: 30-40%; Scott/Oden-Jones Tie: 30-40%; 40-50%; Oden-Jones/Hendrix Tie: 20-30%; No Votes: No Votes

2022 Alabama House of Representatives Democratic primary election, 55th District
| Party | Candidate | Votes | % |
|---|---|---|---|
| Democratic | Roderick "Rod" Scott (incumbent) | 1,212 | 25.08% |
| Democratic | Fred "Coach" Plump | 1,080 | 22.35% |
| Democratic | Phyllis E. Oden-Jones | 1,032 | 21.35% |
| Democratic | Travis Hendrix | 915 | 18.93% |
| Democratic | Antwon Bernard Womack | 594 | 12.29% |
| Total votes | | 4,833 | 100 |

2022 Alabama House of Representatives Democratic primary runoff election, 55th District
| Party | Candidate | Votes | % |
|---|---|---|---|
| Democratic | Fred "Coach" Plump | 952 | 50.88% |
| Democratic | Roderick "Rod" Scott (incumbent) | 919 | 49.12% |
| Total votes | | 1,871 | 100 |

2022 Alabama House of Representatives general election, 55th District
| Party | Candidate | Votes | % |
|---|---|---|---|
| Democratic | Fred "Coach" Plump | 10,018 | 99.3% |
| Write-in | | 67 | 0.7% |
| Total votes | | 10,085 | 100 |
| Democratic hold | | | |

==== Endorsements ====
Rod Scott

PACs

- ~~Alabama REALTORSPAC~~ (switched endorsement to Plump)
- Alabama RetailPAC
- NFIB AlabamaPAC
- ProgressPAC
Fred "Coach" Plump

PACs

- Alabama REALTORSPAC

Unions

- AFL–CIO

=== District 56 ===
Second-term incumbent Democratic representative Louise Alexander represented the 56th District since November 2014. Alexander would forgo reelection to run for the seat of retiring state senator Priscilla Dunn. Birmingham Water Works Board member Tereshia Huffman, former Bessemer city councilman Cleo King, current Bessemer city councilman Jesse Matthews and attorney at law Ontario Tillman all ran in the primary to replace Alexander. No candidate eclipsed the needed number of votes to win outright, so Huffman and Tillman advanced to a runoff. In the runoff, Tillman trounced Huffman on the way to gaining his party's nomination for the seat. The Libertarian Party nominated Carson B. Lester to challenge Tillman for the seat in the general election.

2022 Alabama House of Representatives general election, 56th District
| Party | Candidate | Votes | % |
|---|---|---|---|
| Democratic | Ontario J. Tillman | 9,008 | 90.65% |
| Libertarian | Carson B. Lester | 869 | 8.75% |
| Write-in | | 60 | 0.60 |
| Total votes | | 9,937 | 100 |

2022 Alabama House of Representatives Democratic primary runoff election, 56th District
| Party | Candidate | Votes | % |
|---|---|---|---|
| Democratic | Ontario J. Tillman | 1,906 | 71.23% |
| Democratic | Tereshia Huffman | 770 | 28.77% |
| Total votes | | 2,676 | 100 |

2022 Alabama House of Representatives Democratic primary election, 56th District
| Party | Candidate | Votes | % |
|---|---|---|---|
| Democratic | Ontario J. Tillman | 2,092 | 41.71% |
| Democratic | Tereshia Huffman | 1,199 | 23.90% |
| Democratic | Jesse Matthews | 1,011 | 20.16% |
| Democratic | Cleo King | 714 | 14.23% |
| Total votes | | 5,016 | 100 |

==== Endorsements ====
Ontario J. Tillman

PACs

- Alabama REALTORSPAC
- ProgressPAC

Unions

- AFL–CIO
Carson B. Lester

Organizations

- Alabama Cannabis Coalition

=== District 57 ===
Fifth-term incumbent Democratic representative Merika Coleman opted to forgo reelection to run for the Senate seat of the retiring Priscilla Dunn. Pleasant Grove city councilman Kevin Dunn, pastor Patrick Sellers and United States Army veteran Charles Ray Winston III all ran in the primary to replace Coleman. Sellers just barely finished below the threshold for outright victory, so he and Winston advanced to a runoff. Sellers managed to win the runoff by the skin of his teeth, going on to face Republican nominee Delor Baumann and Libertarian nominee Manijeh Nancy Jones in the general election.

2022 Alabama House of Representatives general election, 57th District
| Party | Candidate | Votes | % |
|---|---|---|---|
| Democratic | Patrick Sellers | 9,221 | 64.88% |
| Republican | Delor Baumann | 4,752 | 33.44% |
| Libertarian | Manijeh Nancy Jones | 218 | 1.53% |
| Write-in | | 21 | 0.15% |
| Total votes | | 14,212 | 100 |

2022 Alabama House of Representatives Democratic primary runoff election, 57th District
| Party | Candidate | Votes | % |
|---|---|---|---|
| Democratic | Patrick Sellers | 1,261 | 52.39% |
| Democratic | Charles Ray Winston III | 1,146 | 47.61% |
| Total votes | | 2,407 | 100 |

2022 Alabama House of Representatives Democratic primary election, 57th District
| Party | Candidate | Votes | % |
|---|---|---|---|
| Democratic | Patrick Sellers | 2,363 | 47.12% |
| Democratic | Charles Ray Winston III | 1,370 | 27.32% |
| Democratic | Kevin "K.D." Dunn | 1,282 | 25.56% |
| Total votes | | 5,015 | 100 |

==== Endorsements ====
Patrick Sellers

PACs

- Alabama REALTORSPAC
- ProgressPAC

Unions

- AFL–CIO
Kevin Dunn

PACs

- ~~Alabama REALTORSPAC~~ (switched endorsement to Sellers)
Manijeh Nancy Jones

Organizations

- Alabama Cannabis Coalition

=== District 58 ===
Second-term incumbent Democratic representative Rolanda Hollis ran unopposed in the 58th district.

2022 Alabama House of Representatives general election, 58th District
| Party | Candidate | Votes | % |
|---|---|---|---|
| Democratic | Rolanda Hollis (incumbent) | 8,385 | 98.61% |
| Write-in | | 118 | 1.39% |
| Total votes | | 8,503 | 100 |
| Democratic hold | | | |

==== Endorsements ====
Rolanda Hollis

PACs

- Alabama REALTORSPAC
- ProgressPAC

Unions

- AFL–CIO

=== District 59 ===
Sixth-term incumbent Democratic representative Mary Moore ran unopposed in the 59th district.

2022 Alabama House of Representatives general election, 59th District
| Party | Candidate | Votes | % |
|---|---|---|---|
| Democratic | Mary Moore (incumbent) | 8,859 | 99.19% |
| Write-in | | 72 | 0.81% |
| Total votes | | 8,931 | 100 |
| Democratic hold | | | |

==== Endorsements ====
Mary Moore

PACs

- Alabama REALTORSPAC

Unions

- AFL–CIO

=== District 60 ===
Third-term incumbent Democratic representative Juandalynn Givan was challenged by firefighter Nina Taylor in the primary. Givan easily won the primary and advanced to face Libertarian nominee and Fultondale native J.P. French in the general election.

2022 Alabama House of Representatives general election, 60th District
| Party | Candidate | Votes | % |
|---|---|---|---|
| Democratic | Juandalynn Givan (incumbent) | 9,872 | 89.36% |
| Libertarian | J.P. French | 1,126 | 10.19% |
| Write-in | | 50 | 0.45% |
| Total votes | | 11,048 | 100 |

2022 Alabama House of Representatives Democratic primary election, 60th District
| Party | Candidate | Votes | % |
|---|---|---|---|
| Democratic | Juandalynn Givan (incumbent) | 4,561 | 78.01% |
| Democratic | Nina Taylor | 1,286 | 21.99% |
| Total votes | | 5,847 | 100 |

==== Endorsements ====
Juandalynn Givan

Organizations

- Manufacture Alabama

PACs

- Alabama REALTORSPAC
- Alabama RetailPAC
- ProgressPAC

Unions

- AFL–CIO
J.P. French

Organizations

- Alabama Cannabis Coalition
- LetBamaVote.org

=== District 61 ===
First-term incumbent Republican representative Rodney Sullivan announced he would not run for reelection in the 2022 cycle. Retired Northport police captain Ron Bolton ran for the Republican nomination against media broadcaster Kimberly Madison. In the primary, Bolton scored a convincing victory and advanced to the general election against data analyst Damon Pruet.

2022 Alabama House of Representatives general election, 61st District
| Party | Candidate | Votes | % |
|---|---|---|---|
| Republican | Ron Bolton | 10,546 | 89.00% |
| Libertarian | Damon Pruet | 1,239 | 10.46% |
| Write-in | | 64 | 0.54% |
| Total votes | | 11,849 | 100 |

2022 Alabama House of Representatives Republican primary election, 61st District
| Party | Candidate | Votes | % |
|---|---|---|---|
| Republican | Ron Bolton | 4,088 | 58.96% |
| Republican | Kimberly Madison | 2,846 | 41.04% |
| Total votes | | 6,934 | 100 |

==== Endorsements ====
Ron Bolton

Organizations

- Manufacture Alabama

PACs

- Alabama REALTORSPAC
- ForestPAC
- NFIB AlabamaPAC
- ProgressPAC
Kimberly Madison

Organizations

- Stand for Health Freedom
Damon Pruet

Unions

- AFL–CIO

=== District 62 ===
Second-term incumbent Republican representative Rich Wingo announced he would retire at the end of the quadrennium. Tuscaloosa County CFO Bill Lamb ran for the seat. He was challenged in the general election by Democratic nominee Brenda Cephus.

2022 Alabama House of Representatives general election, 62nd District
| Party | Candidate | Votes | % |
|---|---|---|---|
| Republican | Bill Lamb | 8,803 | 73.93% |
| Democratic | Brenda T. Cephus | 3,094 | 25.99% |
| Write-in | | 10 | 0.08% |
| Total votes | | 11,907 | 100 |

==== Endorsements ====
Bill Lamb

Organizations

- Manufacture Alabama

PACs

- Alabama REALTORSPAC
- ForestPAC
- ProgressPAC
Brenda Cephus

Unions

- AFL–CIO

=== District 63 ===
Third-term incumbent Republican representative Bill Poole resigned his seat to become State Finance Director, and he was succeeded in a special election by Cynthia Almond. Lawyer Samuel Adams contested Almond for the district in the general election.

2022 Alabama House of Representatives general election, 63rd District
| Party | Candidate | Votes | % |
|---|---|---|---|
| Republican | Cynthia Almond (incumbent) | 5,541 | 66.15% |
| Democratic | Samuel Adams | 2,827 | 33.75% |
| Write-in | | 8 | 0.00% |
| Total votes | | 8,376 | 100 |

==== Endorsements ====
Cynthia Almond

Organizations

- Manufacture Alabama

PACs

- Alabama REALTORSPAC
- ForestPAC
- ProgressPAC
Samuel Adams

Unions

- AFL–CIO

=== District 64 ===
Fourth-term incumbent Republican representative Harry Shiver announced he would not seek reelection. Retired Department of Homeland Security Special Agent Angelo Jacob Fermo and University of Mobile alumna Donna Givens both ran in the primary to succeed Shiver. Givens wound up winning the primary by a slim margin and advanced to the general election against Libertarian nominee Jeff May. Democratic primary and general election were canceled because the Republican candidate was the only candidate in the general election.

2022 Alabama House of Representatives general election, 64th District
| Party | Candidate | Votes | % |
|---|---|---|---|
| Republican | Donna Givens | 11,041 | 90.29% |
| Libertarian | Jeff May | 1,133 | 9.27% |
| Write-in | | 54 | 0.44% |
| Total votes | | 12,228 | 100 |

2022 Alabama House of Representatives Republican primary election, 64th District
| Party | Candidate | Votes | % |
|---|---|---|---|
| Republican | Angelo Jacob Fermo | 2,910 | 48.19% |
| Republican | Donna Givens | 3,129 | 51.81% |
| Total votes | | 6,039 | 100 |

==== Endorsements ====
Donna Givens

Organizations

- Manufacture Alabama

PACs

- Alabama REALTORSPAC
- FarmPAC
- ForestPAC
- NFIB AlabamaPAC
- ProgressPAC
Jeff May

Organizations

- Alabama Cannabis Coalition

Unions

- AFL–CIO

=== District 65 ===
First-term incumbent Republican representative Brett Easterbrook was challenged in the primary by Gilbertown city councilwoman Dee Ann Campbell in the Republican primary, but Easterbrook crushed her en route to securing the nomination. The Democratic Party nominated Marcus Caster to challenge Easterbrook in the general election.

2022 Alabama House of Representatives general election, 65th District
| Party | Candidate | Votes | % |
|---|---|---|---|
| Republican | Brett Easterbrook (incumbent) | 12,693 | 72.72% |
| Democratic | Marcus Caster | 4,759 | 27.26% |
| Write-in | | 4 | 0.02% |
| Total votes | | 17,456 | 100 |

2022 Alabama House of Representatives Republican primary election, 65th District
| Party | Candidate | Votes | % |
|---|---|---|---|
| Republican | Brett Easterbrook (incumbent) | 6,760 | 70.26% |
| Republican | Dee Ann Campbell | 2,861 | 19.74% |
| Total votes | | 9,621 | 100 |

==== Endorsements ====
Brett Easterbrook

Organizations

- Manufacture Alabama

PACs

- Alabama REALTORSPAC
- Alabama RetailPAC
- ForestPAC
- NFIB AlabamaPAC
Marcus Caster

Unions

- AFL–CIO

=== District 66 ===
Fourth-term incumbent Republican representative Alan Baker ran unopposed in the 66th district.

2022 Alabama House of Representatives general election, 66th District
| Party | Candidate | Votes | % |
|---|---|---|---|
| Republican | Alan Baker (incumbent) | 12,042 | 99.06% |
| Write-in | | 114 | 0.94% |
| Total votes | | 12,156 | 100 |
| Republican hold | | | |

==== Endorsements ====
Alan Baker

Organizations

- Manufacture Alabama

PACs

- Alabama REALTORSPAC
- ForestPAC
- NFIB AlabamaPAC

=== District 67 ===
Second-term incumbent Democratic representative Prince Chestnut was challenged in the Democratic primary by Larine Irby Pettway. Chestnut gave Pettway an electoral beatdown and ran unopposed in the general election.

2022 Alabama House of Representatives general election, 67th District
| Party | Candidate | Votes | % |
|---|---|---|---|
| Democratic | Prince Chestnut (incumbent) | 10,335 | 98.53% |
| Write-in | | 154 | 1.47% |
| Total votes | | 10,489 | 100 |
| Democratic hold | | | |

2022 Alabama House of Representatives Republican primary election, 67th District
| Party | Candidate | Votes | % |
|---|---|---|---|
| Democratic | Prince Chestnut (incumbent) | 7,210 | 70.24% |
| Democratic | Larine Irby Pettway | 3,055 | 19.76% |
| Total votes | | 10,265 | 100 |

==== Endorsements ====
Prince Chestnut

Organizations

- Manufacture Alabama

PACs

- Alabama REALTORSPAC
- Alabama RetailPAC
- FarmPAC
- ForestPAC
- ProgressPAC

Unions

- AFL–CIO

=== District 68 ===
Eighth-term incumbent Democratic representative Thomas Jackson had represented Alabama House of Representatives 68th District since February 1994. He was challenged in the general election by marketing director Fred Kelley

2022 Alabama House of Representatives general election, 68th District
| Party | Candidate | Votes | % |
|---|---|---|---|
| Democratic | Thomas E. "Action" Jackson (incumbent) | 9,537 | 51.47% |
| Republican | Fred Kelley | 8,981 | 48.47% |
| Write-in | | 10 | 0.06% |
| Total votes | | 18,528 | 100 |

==== Endorsements ====
Thomas E. "Action" Jackson

Organizations

- Manufacture Alabama

PACs

- Alabama REALTORSPAC
- ProgressPAC

Unions

- AFL–CIO
Fred Kelley

Organizations

- Stand for Health Freedom

PACs

- ForestPAC
- NFIB AlabamaPAC

=== District 69 ===
Second-term incumbent Democratic representative Kelvin Lawrence ran against Republican nominee Karla Knight Maddox in the 69th district.

2022 Alabama House of Representatives general election, 69th District
| Party | Candidate | Votes | % |
|---|---|---|---|
| Democratic | Kelvin Lawrence (incumbent) | | |
| Republican | Karla Knight Maddox | | |
| Write-in | | | |
| Total votes | | | 100 |

==== Endorsements ====
Kelvin Lawrence

Organizations

- Manufacture Alabama

PACs

- Alabama REALTORSPAC
- FarmPAC

Unions

- AFL–CIO

=== District 70 ===
Fourth-term incumbent Democratic representative Christopher J. England ran unopposed in the 70th district.

2022 Alabama House of Representatives general election, 70th District
| Party | Candidate | Votes | % |
|---|---|---|---|
| Democratic | Christopher John England (incumbent) | | |
| Write-in | | | |
| Total votes | | | 100 |
| Democratic hold | | | |

==== Endorsements ====
Christopher England

Organizations

- Manufacture Alabama

PACs

- Alabama REALTORSPAC
- FarmPAC

Unions

- AFL–CIO

=== District 71 ===
Fifth-term incumbent Democratic representative Artis J. McCampbell ran unopposed in the 71st district.

2022 Alabama House of Representatives general election, 71st District
| Party | Candidate | Votes | % |
|---|---|---|---|
| Democratic | Artis "AJ" McCampbell (incumbent) | | |
| Write-in | | | |
| Total votes | | | 100 |
| Democratic hold | | | |

==== Endorsements ====
Artis McCampbell

Organizations

- Manufacture Alabama

PACs

- Alabama REALTORSPAC
- ForestPAC
- NFIB AlabamaPAC

Unions

- AFL–CIO

=== District 72 ===
Fifth-term incumbent Democratic representative Ralph Anthony Howard was narrowly ousted in the primary by environmental engineer Curtis Travis. No Libertarians or Republicans filed to run for the seat, leaving Travis unopposed in the general election.

2022 Alabama House of Representatives general election, 72nd District
| Party | Candidate | Votes | % |
|---|---|---|---|
| Democratic | Curtis L. Travis | | |
| Write-in | | | |
| Total votes | | | 100 |
| Democratic hold | | | |

2022 Alabama House of Representatives Democratic election, 72nd District
| Party | Candidate | Votes | % |
|---|---|---|---|
| Democratic | Ralph A. Howard (incumbent) | 2,794 | 47.36% |
| Democratic | Curtis L. Travis | 3,106 | 52.64% |
| Total votes | | 5,900 | 100 |

==== Endorsements ====
Ralph Howard

PACs

- ~~Alabama REALTORSPAC~~ (switched endorsement to Travis)
- Alabama RetailPAC
- FarmPAC
- ~~ProgressPAC~~ (switched endorsement to Travis)
Curtis L. Travis

PACs

- Alabama REALTORSPAC
- ProgressPAC

Unions

- AFL–CIO

=== District 73 ===
Kenneth Paschal ran for his first full term unopposed in the 73rd district.

2022 Alabama House of Representatives general election, 73rd District
| Party | Candidate | Votes | % |
|---|---|---|---|
| Republican | Kenneth Paschal (incumbent) | | |
| Write-in | | | |
| Total votes | | | 100 |
| Republican hold | | | |

==== Endorsements ====
Kenneth Paschal

Organizations

- Manufacture Alabama

PACs

- Alabama REALTORSPAC
- FarmPAC
- ForestPAC
- ProgressPAC

=== District 74 ===
Third-term incumbent Republican representative Dimitri Polizos was succeeded by Charlotte Meadows in a special election in 2019. Meadows ran for her first full term against lawyer Phillip Ensler after he defeated businessman Malcolm Calhoun in the Democratic primary.

2022 Alabama House of Representatives general election, 74th District
| Party | Candidate | Votes | % |
|---|---|---|---|
| Republican | Charlotte Meadows (incumbent) | | |
| Democratic | Phillip Ensler | | |
| Write-in | | | |
| Total votes | | | 100 |

2022 Alabama House of Representatives Democratic primary election, 74th District
| Party | Candidate | Votes | % |
|---|---|---|---|
| Democratic | Malcolm Calhoun | 1,143 | 34.50% |
| Democratic | Phillip Ensler | 2,170 | 65.50% |
| Total votes | | 3,313 | 100 |

==== Endorsements ====
Charlotte Meadows

Organizations

- Manufacture Alabama

PACs

- Alabama REALTORSPAC
- ForestPAC
- NFIB AlabamaPAC
Phillip Ensler

Individuals

- Kirk Hatcher, Member of the Alabama State Senate from the 26th District (2021-present)
- Tashina Morris, Member of the Alabama House of Representatives from the 77th District (2018-present)

Unions

- AFL–CIO

=== District 75 ===
Second-term incumbent Republican representative Reed Ingram ran unopposed in the 75th district.

2022 Alabama House of Representatives general election, 75th District
| Party | Candidate | Votes | % |
|---|---|---|---|
| Republican | Reed Ingram (incumbent) | | |
| Write-in | | | |
| Total votes | | | 100 |
| Republican hold | | | |

==== Endorsements ====
Reed Ingram

Organizations

- Manufacture Alabama

PACs

- Alabama REALTORSPAC
- FarmPAC
- ForestPAC
- NFIB AlabamaPAC

=== District 76 ===
Patrice McClammy succeeded her father, Thad McClammy, in a special election in 2021. She ran for her first full term against Libertarian nominee Scott Manges.

2022 Alabama House of Representatives general election, 76th District
| Party | Candidate | Votes | % |
|---|---|---|---|
| Democratic | Patrice "Penni" McClammy (incumbent) | 8,312 | 90.66% |
| Libertarian | Scott Manges | 816 | 8.90% |
| Write-in | | 40 | 0.44% |
| Total votes | | 9,168 | 100 |

==== Endorsements ====
Patrice McClammy

PACs

- Alabama REALTORSPAC
- ProgressPAC

Unions

- AFL–CIO
Scott Manges

Organizations

- Alabama Cannabis Coalition

=== District 77 ===
First-term incumbent Democratic representative Tashina Morris ran unopposed in the 77th district.

2022 Alabama House of Representatives general election, 77th District
| Party | Candidate | Votes | % |
|---|---|---|---|
| Democratic | TaShina Morris (incumbent) | | |
| Write-in | | | |
| Total votes | | | 100 |
| Democratic hold | | | |

==== Endorsements ====
TaShina Morris

PACs

- Alabama REALTORSPAC
- ProgressPAC

Unions

- AFL–CIO

=== District 78 ===
Kenyatté Hassell was running for his first full term unopposed after succeeding Kirk Hatcher in a special election in 2021. The election was canceled because he was the only candidate. He was reelected for a second term.

2022 Alabama House of Representatives general election, 78th District
| Party | Candidate | Votes | % |
|---|---|---|---|
| Democratic | Kenyatté Hassell (incumbent) | | |
| Write-in | | | |
| Total votes | | | 100 |
| Democratic hold | | | |

==== Endorsements ====
Kenyatte Hassell

Organizations

- Manufacture Alabama

PACs

- Alabama REALTORSPAC
- ProgressPAC

Unions

- AFL–CIO

=== District 79 ===
Second-term incumbent Republican representative Joe Lovvorn had represented the 79th district since 2014. The Libertarian Party nominated Amanda Frison to challenge Lovvorn in the general election.

2022 Alabama House of Representatives general election, 79th District
| Party | Candidate | Votes | % |
|---|---|---|---|
| Republican | Joe Lovvorn (incumbent) | 7,690 | 81.24% |
| Libertarian | Amanda Frison | 1,692 | 17.87% |
| Write-in | | 84 | 0.89 |
| Total votes | | 9,466 | 100 |

==== Endorsements ====
Joe Lovvorn

Organizations

- Manufacture Alabama

PACs

- Alabama REALTORSPAC
- FarmPAC
- ForestPAC
- NFIB AlabamaPAC
Amanda Frison

Organizations

- Alabama Cannabis Coalition
- LetBamaVote.org

Unions

- AFL–CIO

=== District 80 ===
Second-term incumbent Republican representative Chris Blackshear ran unopposed in the 80th district.

2022 Alabama House of Representatives general election, 80th District
| Party | Candidate | Votes | % |
|---|---|---|---|
| Republican | Chris E. Blackshear (incumbent) | 8,113 | 97.6% |
| Write-in | | | |
| Total votes | | 8,315 | 100 |
| Republican hold | | | |

==== Endorsements ====
Chris Blackshear

Organizations

- Manufacture Alabama

PACs

- Alabama REALTORSPAC
- ForestPAC
- NFIB AlabamaPAC

=== District 81 ===
First-term incumbent Republican representative Ed Oliver ran unopposed in the 81st district.

2022 Alabama House of Representatives general election, 81st District
| Party | Candidate | Votes | % |
|---|---|---|---|
| Republican | Ed Oliver (incumbent) | 12,116 | 98.8% |
| Write-in | | | |
| Total votes | | 12,260 | 100 |
| Republican hold | | | |

==== Endorsements ====
Ed Oliver

Organizations

- Manufacture Alabama

PACs

- Alabama REALTORSPAC
- ForestPAC
- NFIB AlabamaPAC

=== District 82 ===
Fifth-term incumbent Democratic representative Pebblin Warren narrowly fended off challenger Terrence Kareem Johnson in the Democratic primary. Warren advanced to face Republican nominee and Saint Lucia native Lennora "Tia" Pierrot in the general election.

2022 Alabama House of Representatives general election, 82nd District
| Party | Candidate | Votes | % |
|---|---|---|---|
| Democratic | Pebblin Walker Warren (incumbent) | 6,257 | 71.1% |
| Republican | Lennora "Tia" Pierrot | 2,526 | 28.7% |
| Write-in | | | |
| Total votes | | 8,805 | 100 |

2022 Alabama House of Representatives Republican primary election, 82nd District
| Party | Candidate | Votes | % |
|---|---|---|---|
| Democratic | Pebblin Walker Warren (incumbent) | 2,112 | 54.90% |
| Democratic | Terrence Kareem Johnson | 1,735 | 45.10% |
| Total votes | | 3,847 | 100 |

==== Endorsements ====
Pebblin Walker Warren

Organizations

- Manufacture Alabama

PACs

- Alabama REALTORSPAC
- Alabama RetailPAC
- FarmPAC
- ForestPAC

Unions

- AFL–CIO

=== District 83 ===
First-term incumbent Democratic representative Jeremy Gray ran unopposed in the 83rd district.

2022 Alabama House of Representatives general election, 83rd District
| Party | Candidate | Votes | % |
|---|---|---|---|
| Democratic | Jeremy Gray (incumbent) | 6,540 | 95.7% |
| Write-in | | | |
| Total votes | | 6,831 | 100 |
| Democratic hold | | | |

==== Endorsements ====
Jeremy Gray

Organizations

- Manufacture Alabama

PACs

- Alabama REALTORSPAC
- FarmPAC
- ForestPAC

Unions

- AFL–CIO

=== District 84 ===
Third-term incumbent Democratic representative Berry Forte ran unopposed in the 84th district.

2022 Alabama House of Representatives general election, 84th District
| Party | Candidate | Votes | % |
|---|---|---|---|
| Democratic | Berry Forte (incumbent) | 7,463 | 96.4% |
| Write-in | | | |
| Total votes | | 7,740 | 100 |
| Democratic hold | | | |

==== Endorsements ====
Berry Forte

PACs

- Alabama REALTORSPAC

Unions

- AFL–CIO

=== District 85 ===
Third-term incumbent Democratic representative Dexter Grimsley ran for reelection against Republican nominee Rick Rehm. Grimsley lost the general election to Rehm.

2022 Alabama House of Representatives general election, 85th District
| Party | Candidate | Votes | % |
|---|---|---|---|
| Democratic | Dexter Grimsley (incumbent) | 5,668 | 46% |
| Republican | Rick Rehm | 6,665 | 54% |
| Write-in | | | |
| Total votes | | 12,335 | 100 |

==== Endorsements ====
Dexter Grimsley

Organizations

- Manufacture Alabama

PACs

- Alabama REALTORSPAC
- ForestPAC
- NFIB AlabamaPAC

Unions

- AFL–CIO

=== District 86 ===
Third-term incumbent Republican representative Paul Lee ran unopposed in the 86th district.

2022 Alabama House of Representatives general election, 86th District
| Party | Candidate | Votes | % |
|---|---|---|---|
| Republican | Paul W. Lee (incumbent) | 10,697 | 98.5% |
| Write-in | | | |
| Total votes | | 10,863 | 100 |
| Republican hold | | | |

==== Endorsements ====
Paul W. Lee

Organizations

- Manufacture Alabama

PACs

- Alabama REALTORSPAC
- FarmPAC
- ForestPAC
- NFIB AlabamaPAC

Unions

- AFL–CIO

=== District 87 ===
First-term incumbent Republican representative Jeff Sorrells was challenged in the Republican primary by former Geneva County EMA director Eric Johnson. Sorrells trounced Johnson and cruised to the general election unopposed.

2022 Alabama House of Representatives general election, 87th District
| Party | Candidate | Votes | % |
|---|---|---|---|
| Republican | Jeff Sorrells (incumbent) | 12,957 | 99.2% |
| Write-in | | | |
| Total votes | | 13,055 | 100 |
| Republican hold | | | |

2022 Alabama House of Representatives Republican primary election, 87th District
| Party | Candidate | Votes | % |
|---|---|---|---|
| Republican | Jeff Sorrells (incumbent) | 7,286 | 78.44% |
| Republican | Eric E. Johnson | 2,003 | 21.56% |
| Total votes | | | 100 |

==== Endorsements ====
Jeff Sorrells

Organizations

- Manufacture Alabama

PACs

- Alabama REALTORSPAC
- Alabama RetailPAC
- ForestPAC
- NFIB AlabamaPAC
Eric Johnson

Organizations

- Stand for Health Freedom

=== District 88 ===
First-term incumbent Republican representative Will Dismukes was stunned in the primary by Prattville city councilman Jerry Starnes. The Libertarian Party nominated restaurant owner Justin "Tyler" May to face Starnes in the general election.

2022 Alabama House of Representatives general election, 88th District
| Party | Candidate | Votes | % |
|---|---|---|---|
| Republican | Jerry Starnes | 10,020 | 86.23% |
| Libertarian | Justin "Tyler" May | 1,524 | 13.12% |
| Write-in | | 76 | 0.65 |
| Total votes | | 11,620 | 100 |

2022 Alabama House of Representatives Republican primary election, 88th District
| Party | Candidate | Votes | % |
|---|---|---|---|
| Republican | Will Dismukes (incumbent) | 2,520 | 38.04% |
| Republican | Jerry Starnes | 4,104 | 61.96% |
| Total votes | | 6,624 | 100 |

==== Endorsements ====
Jerry Starnes

Organizations

- Manufacture Alabama

PACs

- Alabama REALTORSPAC
- ProgressPAC
Justin "Tyler" May

Organizations

- Alabama Cannabis Coalition
- LetBamaVote.org

Unions

- AFL–CIO

=== District 89 ===
First-term incumbent Republican representative Wes Allen opted to forgo reelection in order to run for Alabama Secretary of State. The Republican Party nominated Troy city councilman Marcus Paramore to succeed Allen.

2022 Alabama House of Representatives general election, 89th District
| Party | Candidate | Votes | % |
|---|---|---|---|
| Republican | Marcus B. Paramore | 7,855 | 98.1% |
| Write-in | | | |
| Total votes | | 8,010 | 100 |
| Republican hold | | | |

==== Endorsements ====
Marcus Paramore

Organizations

- Manufacture Alabama

PACs

- Alabama REALTORSPAC
- ForestPAC
- NFIB AlabamaPAC
- ProgressPAC

=== District 90 ===
Second-term incumbent Republican representative Chris Sells ran unopposed in the 90th district.

2022 Alabama House of Representatives general election, 90th District
| Party | Candidate | Votes | % |
|---|---|---|---|
| Republican | Chris Sells (incumbent) | 11,567 | 98.8% |
| Write-in | | | |
| Total votes | | 11,708 | 100 |
| Republican hold | | | |

==== Endorsements ====
Chris Sells

Organizations

- Manufacture Alabama

PACs

- Alabama REALTORSPAC
- ForestPAC
- NFIB AlabamaPAC

Unions

- AFL–CIO

=== District 91 ===
First-term incumbent Republican representative Rhett Marques was challenged by small business owner Les Hogan in the Republican primary, with Marques torching Hogan in the primary. No Libertarians or Democrats filed to run for the seat, leaving Marques unopposed in the general election.

2022 Alabama House of Representatives general election, 91st District
| Party | Candidate | Votes | % |
|---|---|---|---|
| Republican | Rhett Marques (incumbent) | 9,794 | 98.5% |
| Write-in | | | |
| Total votes | | 9,940 | 100 |
| Republican hold | | | |

2022 Alabama House of Representatives Republican primary election, 91st District
| Party | Candidate | Votes | % |
|---|---|---|---|
| Republican | Rhett Marques (incumbent) | 4,813 | 65.18% |
| Republican | Les W. Hogan | 2,571 | 34.82% |
| Total votes | | 7,384 | 100 |

==== Endorsements ====
Rhett Marques

Organizations

- Manufacture Alabama

PACs

- Alabama REALTORSPAC
- Alabama RetailPAC
- FarmPAC
- ForestPAC
- NFIB AlabamaPAC
Les Hogan

Organizations

- Stand for Health Freedom

=== District 92 ===
First-term incumbent Republican representative Mike Jones stepped down to run for a seat in the Alabama Senate. Farmer Matthew Hammett and certified public accountant Greg White ran in the primary to succeed Jones. Hammett narrowly defeated White in the primary. The Democratic Party nominated Lurleen B. Wallace Community College English professor Steve Hubbard to challenge Hammett in the general election.

2022 Alabama House of Representatives general election, 92nd District
| Party | Candidate | Votes | % |
|---|---|---|---|
| Republican | Matthew Hammett | 11,812 | 86.8% |
| Democratic | Steve Hubbard | 1,795 | 13.2% |
| Write-in | | | |
| Total votes | | 13,614 | 100 |

2022 Alabama House of Representatives Republican primary election, 92nd District
| Party | Candidate | Votes | % |
|---|---|---|---|
| Republican | Matthew Hammett | 5,263 | 51.67% |
| Republican | Greg White | 4,923 | 48.33% |
| Total votes | | 10,186 | 100 |

==== Endorsements ====
Matthew Hammett

PACs

- Alabama REALTORSPAC
- NFIB AlabamaPAC
- ProgressPAC
Steve Hubbard

Unions

- AFL–CIO

=== District 93 ===
Eighth-term incumbent Republican representative Steve Clouse ran unopposed in the 93rd district.

2022 Alabama House of Representatives general election, 93rd District
| Party | Candidate | Votes | % |
|---|---|---|---|
| Republican | Steve Clouse (incumbent) | 10,333 | 98.2% |
| Write-in | | | |
| Total votes | | 10,525 | 100 |
| Republican hold | | | |

==== Endorsements ====
Steve Clouse

Organizations

- Manufacture Alabama

PACs

- Alabama REALTORSPAC
- FarmPAC
- ForestPAC
- NFIB AlabamaPAC

Unions

- AFL–CIO

=== District 94 ===
Fourth-term incumbent Republican representative Joe Faust was thrown out in the Republican primary by Silverhill native Jennifer Fidler. The Libertarian Party nominated family court judge Margaret "Maggie" Helveston to challenge Fidler in the general election.

2022 Alabama House of Representatives election, 94th District
| Party | Candidate | Votes | % |
|---|---|---|---|
| Republican | Jennifer Fidler | 14,207 | 88.38% |
| Libertarian | Margaret "Maggie" Helveston | 1,815 | 11.29% |
| Write-in | | 53 | 0.33% |
| Total votes | | 16,075 | 100 |

2022 Alabama House of Representatives Republicans primary election, 94th District
| Party | Candidate | Votes | % |
|---|---|---|---|
| Republican | Joe Faust (incumbent) | 3,276 | 36.81% |
| Republican | Jennifer Fidler | 5,623 | 63.19% |
| Total votes | | 8,899 | 100 |

==== Endorsements ====
Jennifer Fidler

PACs

- Alabama REALTORSPAC
- FarmPAC
- ForestPAC
- NFIB AlabamaPAC
- ProgressPAC
Joe Faust

Organizations

- Manufacture Alabama

PACs

- ~~Alabama REALTORSPAC~~ (switched endorsement to Fidler)
- Alabama RetailPAC
- ~~NFIB AlabamaPAC~~ (switched endorsement to Fidler)
Margaret Helveston

Organizations

- Alabama Cannabis Coalition
- LetBamaVote.org

Unions

- AFL–CIO

=== District 95 ===
Eleventh-term incumbent Republican representative Steve McMillan opted not to seek reelection and retire. State Farm agent Frances Holk-Jones, civil engineer Michael Ludvigsen Jr. and insurance agent Reginald Pulliam all ran in the primary to succeed McMillan. Holk-Jones cleared the field without needing a runoff. The Democratic Party nominated University of Alabama alumnus Richard Brackner to challenge Holk-Jones in the general election.

2022 Alabama House of Representatives general election, 95th District
| Party | Candidate | Votes | % |
|---|---|---|---|
| Republican | Frances Holk-Jones | 14,242 | 85.1% |
| Democratic | Richard Brackner | 2,465 | 14.7% |
| Write-in | | | |
| Total votes | | 16,740 | 100 |

2022 Alabama House of Representatives Republican primary election, 95th District
| Party | Candidate | Votes | % |
|---|---|---|---|
| Republican | Frances Holk-Jones | 4,812 | 65.91% |
| Republican | Michael T. Ludvigsen, Jr. | 1,144 | 15.67% |
| Republican | Reginald C. Pulliam | 1,345 | 18.42% |
| Total votes | | 6,168 | 100 |

==== Endorsements ====
Frances Holk-Jones

Organizations

- Manufacture Alabama

PACs

- Alabama REALTORSPAC
- FarmPAC
- ForestPAC
- ProgressPAC
Richard Brackner

Organizations

- Alabama Cannabis Coalition

Unions

- AFL–CIO

=== District 96 ===
First-term incumbent Republican representative Matt Simpson was challenged by teacher Danielle Duggar in the Republican primary, narrowly winning his seat back. No Libertarians or Democrats filed to run for the seat, leaving Simpson unopposed in the general election.

2022 Alabama House of Representatives general election, 96th District
| Party | Candidate | Votes | % |
|---|---|---|---|
| Republican | Matt Simpson (incumbent) | 11,990 | 97.7% |
| Write-in | | | |
| Total votes | | 12,274 | 100 |
| Republican hold | | | |

2022 Alabama House of Representatives Republican primary election, 96th District
| Party | Candidate | Votes | % |
|---|---|---|---|
| Republican | Matt Simpson | 3,415 | 55.37% |
| Republican | Danielle R. Duggar | 2,753 | 44.63% |
| Total votes | | 6,168 | 100 |

==== Endorsements ====
Matt Simpson

Organizations

- Manufacture Alabama

PACs

- Alabama REALTORSPAC
- Alabama RetailPAC
- FarmPAC
- ForestPAC
- NFIB AlabamaPAC
Danielle Duggar

Organizations

- Stand for Health Freedom

=== District 97 ===
Third-term incumbent Democratic representative Adline Clarke ran unopposed in the 97th district.

2022 Alabama House of Representatives general election, 97th District
| Party | Candidate | Votes | % |
|---|---|---|---|
| Democratic | Adline Clarke (incumbent) | 7,337 | 97.0% |
| Write-in | | | |
| Total votes | | 7,564 | 100 |
| Democratic hold | | | |

==== Endorsements ====
Adline Clarke

Organizations

- Manufacture Alabama

PACs

- Alabama REALTORSPAC

Unions

- AFL–CIO

=== District 98 ===
Third-term incumbent Democratic representative Napoleon Bracy Jr. ran unopposed in the 98th district.

2022 Alabama House of Representatives general election, 98th District
| Party | Candidate | Votes | % |
|---|---|---|---|
| Democratic | Napoleon Bracy, Jr. (incumbent) | 7,655 | 95.8% |
| Write-in | | | |
| Total votes | | 7,987 | 100 |
| Democratic hold | | | |

==== Endorsements ====
Napoleon Bracy, Jr.

Organizations

- Manufacture Alabama

PACs

- Alabama REALTORSPAC
- ForestPAC

Unions

- AFL–CIO

=== District 99 ===
First-term incumbent Democratic representative Sam Jones. was challenged by Levi Wright Jr. in the Democratic primary. It was almost like the primary didn't happen. Jones went unopposed in the general election.

2022 Alabama House of Representatives general election, 99th District
| Party | Candidate | Votes | % |
|---|---|---|---|
| Democratic | Sam Jones (incumbent) | 8,252 | 95.9% |
| Write-in | | | |
| Total votes | | 8,601 | 100 |
| Democratic hold | | | |

2022 Alabama House of Representatives Democratic election, 99th District
| Party | Candidate | Votes | % |
|---|---|---|---|
| Democratic | Sam Jones (incumbent) | 2,709 | 85.70% |
| Democratic | Levi Wright, Jr. | 452 | 14.30% |
| Total votes | | 3,161 | 100 |

==== Endorsements ====
Sam Jones

Organizations

- Manufacture Alabama

PACs

- Alabama REALTORSPAC
- Alabama RetailPAC
- ProgressPAC

=== District 100 ===
Eleventh-term incumbent Republican representative Victor Gaston opted to forgo reelection in favor of retirement. Optometrist Mark Shirey, Alabama Law Enforcement Agency officer Joe Piggott and teacher Pete Kupfer all ran in the primary to replace Gaston. No candidate gained over half of the votes, so Kupfer and Shirey advanced to a runoff. Shirey managed to win the runoff and went on to face Libertarian nominee Peyton Warren in the general election.

2022 Alabama House of Representatives general election, 100th District
| Party | Candidate | Votes | % |
|---|---|---|---|
| Republican | Mark Shirey | 9,781 | 85.17% |
| Libertarian | Peyton Warren | 1,627 | 14.17% |
| Write-in | | 76 | 0.66% |
| Total votes | | 11,484 | 100 |

2022 Alabama House of Representatives Republican primary runoff election, 100th District
| Party | Candidate | Votes | % |
|---|---|---|---|
| Republican | Pete Kupfer | 1,214 | 38.50% |
| Republican | Mark Shirey | 1,939 | 61.50% |
| Total votes | | 3,153 | 100 |

2022 Alabama House of Representatives Republican primary election, 100th District
| Party | Candidate | Votes | % |
|---|---|---|---|
| Republican | Pete Kupfer | 1,474 | 28.37% |
| Republican | Joe Piggott | 1,289 | 24.81% |
| Republican | Mark Shirey | 2,432 | 46.81% |
| Total votes | | 5,195 | 100 |

==== Endorsements ====
Mark Shirey

PACs

- Alabama REALTORSPAC

Organizations

- Alabama Farmers Federation
Peyton Warren

Unions

- AFL–CIO

=== District 101 ===
Second-term incumbent Republican representative Chris Pringle ran unopposed in the 101st district.

2022 Alabama House of Representatives general election, 101st District
| Party | Candidate | Votes | % |
|---|---|---|---|
| Republican | Chris Pringle | 8,968 | 97.87% |
| Write-in | | 195 | 2.13% |
| Total votes | | 9,163 | 100.0% |
| Republican hold | | | |

==== Endorsements ====
Chris Pringle

Organizations

- Manufacture Alabama

PACs

- Alabama REALTORSPAC
- ForestPAC
- NFIB AlabamaPAC

=== District 102 ===
First-term incumbent Republican representative Shane Stringer ran unopposed in the 102nd district.

2022 Alabama House of Representatives general election, 102nd District
| Party | Candidate | Votes | % |
|---|---|---|---|
| Republican | Shane Stringer | 10,472 | 98.80% |
| Write-in | | 127 | 1.20% |
| Total votes | | 10,599 | 100.0% |
| Republican hold | | | |

==== Endorsements ====
Shane Stringer

Organizations

- Manufacture Alabama

PACs

- Alabama REALTORSPAC
- NFIB AlabamaPAC

=== District 103 ===
First-term incumbent Democratic representative Barbara Drummond ran unopposed in the 103rd district.

2022 Alabama House of Representatives general election, 103rd District
| Party | Candidate | Votes | % |
|---|---|---|---|
| Democratic | Barbara Drummond | 6,015 | 96.49% |
| Write-in | | 219 | 3.51% |
| Total votes | | 6,234 | 100.0% |
| Democratic hold | | | |

==== Endorsements ====
Barbara Drummond

Organizations

- Manufacture Alabama

PACs

- Alabama REALTORSPAC

Unions

- AFL–CIO

=== District 104 ===
Third-term incumbent Republican representative Margie Wilcox had represented the 104th District since February 2014. Jon Dearman was nominated by the Libertarian Party and contested the district in the general election.

2022 Alabama House of Representatives general election, 104th District
| Party | Candidate | Votes | % |
|---|---|---|---|
| Republican | Margie Wilcox | 8,871 | 81.27% |
| Libertarian | Jon Dearman | 1,960 | 17.96% |
| Write-in | | 85 | 0.78 |
| Total votes | | 10,916 | 100 |

==== Endorsements ====
Margie Wilcox

Organizations

- Manufacture Alabama

PACs

- Alabama REALTORSPAC
- ForestPAC
- NFIB AlabamaPAC

=== District 105 ===
First-term incumbent Republican representative Chip Brown had represented the 105th District since 2018. He was running for reelection. Mobile native Mark Lewis was nominated by the Libertarian Party to contest the district in the general election.

2022 Alabama House of Representatives general election, 105th District
| Party | Candidate | Votes | % |
|---|---|---|---|
| Republican | Chip Brown | 10,554 | 90.16% |
| Libertarian | Mark Lewis | 1,107 | 9.46% |
| Write-in | | 45 | 0.38 |
| Total votes | | 11,706 | 100 |

==== Endorsements ====
Chip Brown

Organizations

- Manufacture Alabama

PACs

- Alabama REALTORSPAC
- ForestPAC
- NFIB AlabamaPAC
Mark Lewis

Organizations

- Alabama Cannabis Coalition
- LetBamaVote.org

Unions

- AFL–CIO

== See also ==
- 2022 United States Senate election in Alabama
- 2022 United States House of Representatives elections
- 2022 United States gubernatorial elections
- 2022 Alabama lieutenant gubernatorial election
- 2022 United States state legislative elections
- 2022 Alabama Senate election
- 2022 Alabama elections
- List of Alabama state legislatures
