= 2026 Alabama lieutenant gubernatorial election =

- November 3, 2026

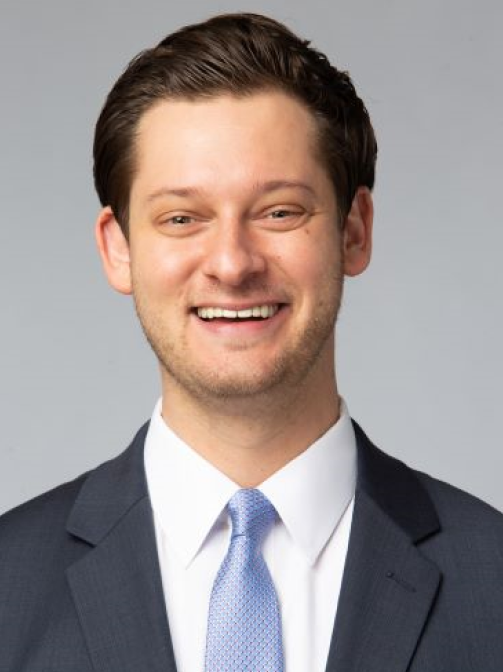
Candidate	John Wahl	Phillip Ensler
Party	Republican	Democratic
Popular vote	910,795	765,131
Percentage	54.3%	45.6%
- Wahl: 50–60% 60–70% 70–80% 80–90% Ensler: 50–60% 60–70% 70–80% 80–90%
Lieutenant Governor before election
Will Ainsworth
Republican
Elected Lieutenant Governor
John Wahl
Republican

The 2026 Alabama lieutenant gubernatorial election was held on November 3, 2026, to elect the next lieutenant governor of Alabama. Primary elections were held on May 19, and the primary runoff election was held on June 16. Incumbent Will Ainsworth was term-limited and ineligible to seek a third full consecutive term.

== Republican primary ==
=== Candidates ===
==== Nominee ====
- John Wahl, former chair of the Alabama Republican Party (2021–2026)

==== Eliminated in runoff ====
- Wes Allen, secretary of state (2023–present)

==== Eliminated in primary ====
- Patrick Bishop, Cullman County deputy
- George Childress, community advocate
- Rick Pate, commissioner of agriculture and industries (2019–present)
- Stewart Tankersley, physician and former member of the Alabama Ethics Commission
- Nicole Wadsworth, commercial realtor and wife of state representative Tim Wadsworth

==== Disqualified ====
- Dean Odle, pastor and candidate for governor in 2022

==== Withdrawn ====
- A. J. McCarron, former professional football player and head coach of the Birmingham Stallions

==== Declined ====
- Mo Brooks, former U.S. representative from Alabama's 5th congressional district (2011–2023) and candidate for U.S. Senate in 2017 and 2022
- Steve Marshall, Attorney General (2017–present) (unsuccessfully ran for U.S. Senate)

=== Campaign ===
Nicole Wadsworth's campaign was the first to attract media attention following a request that was sent out to news organizations, in which her campaign requested that she be called "Dr. Nicole Wadsworth". The AP Stylebook, which many organizations use to dictate how to write news articles, says that only medical doctors should be referred to as such. The next week, her campaign announced that they had made an error listing her credentials and that she had not received as PhD from the University of Alabama, but instead from the North Central Theological Seminary. That school had not been accredited by any organizations recognized by the Council for Higher Education Accreditation. Her entire campaign staff resigned following the report. Later in June, her lawyers requested that 1819 News take down all stories relating to her academic credentials.

Wes Allen has campaigned on his record as Secretary of State, especially his efforts to purge voter rolls. Following A. J. McCarron's entry into the race, Allen stated that "I have a solid record."

McCarron made his first campaign appearance in November, at an Eastern Shore Republican Women's luncheon. He did not make public comments, and his campaign representative stated that McCarron would be announcing his campaign initiatives soon. Allen was the only other candidate who attended the luncheon. McCarron withdrew from the race in December to become the head coach for the Birmingham Stallions.

AL.com first reported on a potential candidacy from John Wahl, the chairman of the Alabama Republican Party, in April 2025 after Steve Flowers mentioned Wahl as a potential candidate in 2026. Wahl confirmed to 1819 News that he was exploring a campaign for lieutenant governor in May 2025, and 256 Today reported that he was still considering it as of November 2025. Despite Wahl never formally announcing a campaign between then and January 2026, president Donald Trump endorsed Wahl as a possible candidate for lieutenant governor through a Truth Social post on January 22, 2026, shortly before candidate qualifying closed the next day. He qualified to run on January 23, and raised over $1 million in the first twelve days of his campaign.

=== Endorsements ===
Wes Allen

State legislators

- 39 state representatives (Note: Russell Bedsole, state representative from the 49th district; Bryan Brinyark, state representative from the 16th district; Chip Brown, state representative from the 105th district; Mack Butler, state representative from the 28th district; Jim Carns, state representative from the 48th district; Brock Colvin, state representative from the 26th district; Danny Crawford, state representative from the 5th district; Brett Easterbrook, state representative from the 65th district; David Faulkner, state representative from the 46th district; Matthew Hammett, state representative from the 92nd district; Jim Hill, state representative from the 50th district; Reed Ingram, state representative from the 75th district; Jamie Kiel, state representative from the 18th district; Mike Kirkland, state representative from the 23rd district; Bill Lamb, state representative from the 62nd district; Paul Lee, state representative from the 86th district; Craig Lipscomb, state representative from the 30th district; James Lomax, state representative from the 20th district; Rhett Marques, state representative from the 91st district; Arnold Mooney, state representative from the 43rd district; Parker Moore, state representative from the 4th district; Ed Oliver, state representative from the 81st district; Marcus Paramore, state representative from the 89th district; Rick Rehm, state representative from the 85th district; Phillip Rigsby, state representative from the 25th district; Chad Robertson, state representative from the 40th district; Jeana Ross, state representative from the 27th district; Ginny Shaver, state representative from the 39th district; Mike Shaw, state representative from the 47th district; Matt Simpson, state representative from the 96th district; Ivan Smith, state representative from the 42nd district; Scott Stadthagen, majority leader of the Alabama House of Representatives (2023–2026) from the 9th district (2019–present); Shane Stringer, state representative from the 102nd district; Troy Stubbs, state representative from the 31st district; Allen Treadaway, state representative from the 51st district; Kerry Underwood, state representative from the 3rd district; Ritchie Whorton, state representative from the 22nd district; Randy Wood, state representative from the 36th district; Ernie Yarbrough, state representative from the 7th district)
- Mac McCutcheon, chair of the Madison County commission and former speaker of the Alabama House of Representatives (2016–2022)

Individuals

- Brilyn Hollyhand, conservative activist
- Gene Stallings, former head coach of the Alabama Crimson Tide football team

Organizations

- Alabama Farmers Federation
- Alabama Forestry Association
- Alabama Realtors PAC
- Associated Builders and Contractors of Alabama
- Business Council of Alabama
- Electric Cooperatives of Alabama
- Home Builders Association of Alabama
- Manufacture Alabama
Rick Pate (eliminated)

Organizations

- Alabama Associated General Contractors
John Wahl

Executive branch officials

- Donald Trump, 45th and 47th president of the United States (2017–2021, 2025–present)

Individuals

- A. J. McCarron, head coach of the Birmingham Stallions (2026–present) and former candidate in this election

Organizations

- National Association for Gun Rights

=== Debates and forums ===
2026 Alabama Republican lieutenant governor primary debates and forums
No.	Date	Host	Moderator	Link	Republican	Republican	Republican	Republican	Republican	Republican	Republican
Key: P Participant A Absent N Not invited I Invited W Withdrawn											
Key: P Participant A Absent N Not invited I Invited W Withdrawn					Allen	Bishop	Childress	Pate	Tankersley	Wadsworth	Wahl
1	March 3, 2026	Republican Women of Huntsville	Bryan Dawson	N/A	A	P	A	P	P	P	P
2	March 12, 2026	Eastern Shore; Republican Women	N/A	N/A	A	P	A	P	A	P	P
3	March 25, 2026	University of Alabama; College Republicans	Jeff Poor	N/A	A	P	A	P	P	P	P

=== Fundraising ===
Campaign finance reports as of May 18, 2026
Candidate	Raised	Other receipts	Spent	Cash on hand
Wes Allen (R)	$1,626,000	$269,830	$1,508,223	$387,606
Patrick Bishop (R)	$8,373	$6,733	$13,365	$1,742
Rick Pate (R)	$473,752	$250,000	$559,741	$164,011
Stewart Tankersley (R)	$97,395	$48	$95,439	$2,003
Nicole Wadsworth (R)	$196,205	$242,000	$270,480	$167,724
John Wahl (R)	$2,088,913	$60,000	$1,516,450	$382,462
Source: Alabama FCPA

=== Polling ===
Poll source	Date(s) administered	Sample size (Note: Key: A – all adults RV – registered voters LV – likely voters V – unclear)	Margin of error	Wes Allen	Patrick Bishop	A.J. McCarron	Rick Pate	Stewart Tankersley	Nicole Wadsworth	John Wahl	Other	Undecided
Remington Research Group (R)	May 5–7, 2026	589 (LV)	± –	29%	2%	—N/a	4%	2%	3%	12%	1% (Note: 1% for Odle, who is not on the ballot)	46%
Cygnal (R) (Note: Poll sponsored by Gray Television and Alabama Daily News)	April 29–30, 2026	500 (LV)	± 4.4%	18%	2%	—N/a	4%	2%	4%	13%	—N/a	56%
American Pulse Research (R)	March 30–April 1, 2026	505 (LV)	± 4.4%	16%	—N/a	—N/a	3%	—N/a	—N/a	9%	6%	66%
The Alabama Poll	March 22–24, 2026	600 (LV)	± 4.0%	19%	—N/a	—N/a	9%	—N/a	5%	7%	—N/a	60%
The Alabama Poll	February 1–4, 2026	500 (LV)	± 4.4%	23%	—N/a	—N/a	6%	—N/a	6%	6%	—N/a	59%
	December 17, 2025	McCarron withdraws from the race										
The Alabama Poll	December 15, 2025	600 (LV)	± 4.0%	18%	—N/a	31%	8%	—N/a	2%	—N/a	—N/a	41%
The Alabama Poll	August 24–26, 2025	600 (LV)	± 4.0%	28%	—N/a	—N/a	12%	—N/a	—N/a	—N/a	—N/a	61%

Hypothetical polling

Poll source	Date(s) administered	Sample size	Margin of error	Wes Allen	A.J. McCarron	John Merrill	Rick Pate	Nicole Wadsworth	Other	Undecided
Quantus Insights (R)	October 13–14, 2025	1,050 (RV)	± 3.2%	26%	14%	10%	9%	2%	4%	36%

=== Results ===
Primary results by county: Wahl: 30–40%; 40–50%; 50–60%; Allen: 30–40%; 40–50%; 50–60%; 80–90%; Pate: 50–60%

Republican primary results
Party	Candidate	Votes	%
Republican	John Wahl	192,432	40.6
Republican	Wes Allen	180,292	38.0
Republican	Rick Pate	34,609	7.3
Republican	Nicole Jones Wadsworth	27,907	5.9
Republican	Pat Bishop	15,405	3.3
Republican	Stewart Hill Tankersley	13,523	2.9
Republican	George Childress	10,318	2.2
Total votes		474,486	100.0

=== Runoff ===
==== Fundraising ====
Campaign finance reports as of June 15, 2026
Candidate	Raised	Other receipts	Spent	Cash on hand
Wes Allen (R)	$2,626,060	$269,830	$2,728,183	$177,706
John Wahl (R)	$2,844,303	$152,500	$2,541,477	$455,325
Source: Alabama FCPA

==== Polling ====
Poll source	Date(s) administered	Sample size	Margin of error	Wes Allen	John Wahl	Undecided
The Alabama Poll	May 28, 2026	600 (LV)	± 4.0%	42%	38%	20%
AM Research Group	May 23–24, 2026	2,144 (LV)	± 3.0%	34%	47%	19%

==== Results ====
Runoff results by county: Wahl: 50–60%; 60–70%; Allen: 50–60%; 60–70%; 80–90%

Republican primary runoff results
Party	Candidate	Votes	%
Republican	John Wahl	175,724	57.0
Republican	Wes Allen	132,625	43.0
Total votes		308,349	100.0

== Democratic primary ==
=== Candidates ===
==== Nominee ====
- Phillip Ensler, state representative from the 74th district (2022–present)

==== Eliminated in primary ====
- Darryl Perryman, former Clarke County school board member

=== Endorsements ===
Phillip Ensler

U.S. senators

- Doug Jones, Alabama (2018–2021) and candidate for governor in 2026

Statewide officials

- Ron Sparks, former commissioner of agriculture and industries (2003–2011) and nominee for the position in 2026

State representatives

- Anthony Daniels, minority leader of the Alabama House of Representatives (2017–present) from the 53rd district (2014–present)

Local officials

- Randall Woodfin, mayor of Birmingham (2017–present)

Organizations

- Alabama Democratic Conference

=== Fundraising ===
Campaign finance reports as of May 18, 2026
Candidate	Raised	Other receipts	Spent	Cash on hand
Phillip Ensler (D)	$197,954	$91	$119,286	$78,759
Darryl Perryman (D)	$150	$0	$2,403	$-2,253
Source: Alabama FCPA

=== Campaign ===
Ensler announced his run for lieutenant governor in December 2025. He described Doug Jones' entry into the 2026 Alabama gubernatorial election as an inspiration for his decision. His lone opponent, Darryl Perryman, qualified to run in January 2026.

=== Results ===
Primary results by county: Ensler: 50–60%; 60–70%; 70–80%; Perryman: 50–60%; 60–70%; 70–80%

Democratic primary results
Party	Candidate	Votes	%
Democratic	Phillip Ensler	196,586	57.6
Democratic	Darryl D. Perryman	144,512	42.4
Total votes		341,098	100.0

== General election ==
=== Post-primary endorsements ===
Phillip Ensler (D)

Labor unions

- Alabama AFL-CIO
- United Mine Workers of America COMPAC
John Wahl (R)

Organizations

- NRA Political Victory Fund

=== Fundraising ===
Campaign finance reports as of November 2, 2026
Candidate	Raised	Other receipts	Spent	Cash on hand
John Wahl (R)	$4,489,100	$158,526	$3,408,200	$1,239,426
Phillip Ensler (D)	$495,907	$10,091	$453,270	$52,728
Source: Alabama FCPA

=== Polling ===
Poll source	Date(s) administered	Sample size	Margin of error	John Wahl (R)	Phillip Ensler (D)	Undecided
Cygnal (R) (Note: Poll conducted for Alabama Daily News and Gray Media Alabama)	October 16–17, 2026	500 (LV)	± 4.4%	50%	34%	16%
The Alabama Poll	October 15–16, 2026	600 (LV)	—	53%	35%	12%
RMG Research (R) (Note: Poll conducted for Alabama Policy Action)	September 21–25, 2026	800 (RV)	± 3.5%	49%	33%	18%

=== Results ===
2026 Alabama lieutenant gubernatorial election
Party	Candidate	Votes	%
Republican	John Wahl	910,795	54.29
Democratic	Phillip Ensler	765,131	45.61
Write-in		1,782	0.11
Total votes		1,677,708	100.00
Republican hold			

== Notes ==
Partisan clients
