= Anthony Howard =

Anthony Howard may refer to:

- Anthony Howard (journalist) (1934–2010), British journalist
- Anthony Howard (swimmer) (born 1979), British swimmer

== See also ==
- Ralph Anthony Howard (active from 2005), American politician in Alabama
- Tony Howard (born 1946), West Indian cricketer
