= Pat Moore (Alabama politician) =

American politician

Pat Moore was a Republican member of the Alabama House of Representatives elected in 2006. She served one term and was defeated for re-nomination in the Republican primary in 2010. She lost to Allen Farley who then was elected in November without opposition.

Moore is involved in real estate investment and timber farming. She and her husband Dan live in Pleasant Grove, Alabama with their two children.

Moore received her bachelor's degree from Auburn University and has a master's degree in mathematics education from the University of Alabama.
