= Elaine Beech =

American politician

Member of the Alabama House of Representatives from the 65th district
- In office 2009–2019
- Preceded by: Marc Keahey
- Succeeded by: Brett Easterbrook

Personal details
- Born: March 16, 1960 (age 66) Chatom, Alabama, U.S.
- Party: Democrat (2009-2019) Republican (2022-present)
- Education: Auburn University (BS)

Elaine H. Beech (born March 16, 1960) is an American politician. She was a member of the Alabama House of Representatives from the 65th District and served from 2009 until her defeat in 2019. She was elected and served as a member of the Democratic Party, though joined the Republican Party in 2022.
