= Craig Ford =

American politician (born 1968)

Mayor of Gadsden, Alabama
- Incumbent
- Assumed office November 7, 2022
- Preceded by: Sherman Guyton

Minority Leader of the Alabama House of Representatives
- In office December 8, 2010 – February 22, 2017
- Preceded by: Mike Hubbard
- Succeeded by: Anthony Daniels

Member of the Alabama House of Representatives from the 28th district
- In office 2000 – November 7, 2018
- Preceded by: Joe Ford
- Succeeded by: Gil Isbell

Personal details
- Born: May 21, 1968 (age 58) Gadsden, Alabama, U.S.
- Party: Independent
- Spouse: Gwen Ford
- Education: Auburn University
- Website: Official campaign website

Military service
- Allegiance: United States
- Branch/service: Army National Guard
- Rank: Major
- Unit: Alabama Army National Guard

Jon Craig Ford (born May 21, 1968) is an Independent former member of the Alabama House of Representatives. He was the House Minority Leader from 2010 to 2016. He currently serves as mayor of Gadsden, Alabama.

== Personal life and education ==
Ford graduated from Auburn University in 1991, with a degree in marketing. His wife, Gwen Glover, teaches at Gadsden State Community College. Ford's father, Joe Ford, served in the Alabama House for 26 years.

== Career ==
Ford was elected to the Alabama House in 2000, succeeding his father. In 2010, he was elected House Minority Leader. Ford served on the Ways and Means - Education Committee, and the Commerce and Small Business Committee. He considered running for governor in 2014.

Ford has proposed repealing the Alabama Accountability Act, proposing instead to spend more money on Alabama's pre-K program and the Alabama Math Science and Technology Initiative. He has led an effort to introduce a state lottery, with the revenue going to education spending.

Ford was among the first lawmakers to call for former Alabama Governor Robert J. Bentley to resign or be impeached for misusing taxpayer dollars and state resources. He also stood up to the Democratic Party's leadership and called for their resignation in light of their own failed leadership and accusations of corruption.

In March 2018, Ford announced he was running as an Independent in Alabama's 10th Senate district, a seat held by Phil Williams of Rainbow City, who was not seeking reelection. He lost to Andrew Jones 60.6%–39.2%.

Ford owns Ford Insurance Agency, as well as The Messenger, a weekly newspaper. He serves as a major in the Alabama Army National Guard.

On November 14, 2021, Ford announced that he was running for mayor of Gadsden. He won the runoff election 62%–38%.
