= Richard Lindsey =

American politician (born 1956)

Member of the Alabama House of Representatives from the 39th district
- In office 1983 – November 6, 2018
- Succeeded by: Ginny Shaver

Personal details
- Born: June 30, 1956 (age 70)
- Party: Democratic

Richard Lindsey (born June 30, 1956) was an American politician. He was a member of the Alabama House of Representatives from the 39th District, serving between 1983 and 2018. He is a member of the Democratic party. His home county is Cherokee County.
