= Gil Isbell =

American politician

Member of the Alabama House of Representatives from the 28th district
- Incumbent
- Assumed office November 7, 2018
- Preceded by: Craig Ford

Personal details
- Born: Gilmer Frank Isbell; April 13, 1958 (age 68)
- Party: Republican
- Spouse: Syndee
- Children: 1

Gilmer Frank Isbell (born April 13, 1958) is an American politician. He is a Republican representing District 28 in the Alabama House of Representatives.

== Political career ==
In 2018, former 28th district representative Craig Ford decided to run for a seat in the Alabama State Senate, leaving his House seat open. Isbell ran for the seat, and defeated Democrat Kyle Pierce to win.

For the 2019–2020 term, Isbell was assigned to the following House committees:

- Commerce and Small Business
- Economic Development and Tourism
- Transportation, Utilities and Infrastructure
