= Tommy Hanes =

American politician

Member of the Alabama House of Representatives from the 23rd district
- Incumbent
- Assumed office November 5, 2014
- Preceded by: John Robinson

Personal details
- Born: James Thomas Hanes Jr. December 12, 1955 (age 70) Bryant, Alabama
- Party: Republican

James Thomas Hanes Jr. (born December 12, 1955) is an American politician who has served in the Alabama House of Representatives from the 23rd district since 2014.
