= Allen Farley =

American politician from Alabama

Member of the Alabama House of Representatives from the 15th district
- In office November 3, 2010 – November 9, 2022
- Preceded by: Pat Moore
- Succeeded by: Leigh Hulsey

Personal details
- Born: October 10, 1951 (age 74) Bessemer, Alabama, U.S.
- Party: Republican
- Profession: Police officer

James Allen Farley (born October 10, 1951) is an American politician. He was a member of the Alabama House of Representatives from the 15th District, serving from 2010 to 2022. He is a member of the Republican Party.
