= Bob Fincher =

American politician (born 1949)

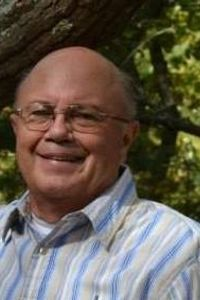

Member of the Alabama House of Representatives from the 37th district
- Incumbent
- Assumed office November 5, 2014
- Preceded by: Richard Laird

Personal details
- Born: August 20, 1949 (age 77)
- Party: Republican
- Spouse: Sheila (deceased) Lisa
- Children: 2
- Profession: teacher

Bob Fincher (born August 20, 1949) is an American politician. He is a member of the Alabama House of Representatives from the 37th District, serving since 2014. He is a member of the Republican Party.

== Early life and education ==
Fincher is a 1970 graduate of Auburn University with a bachelor's degree in history.

== Career ==
A retired teacher, Fincher taught government, economics and history for 31 years in public schools. He also worked as a teacher and administrator at a private school for five years.
