= Jimmy Martin (politician) =

American politician (1938–2019)

James Martin

Member of the Alabama House of Representatives from the 42nd district
- In office 2014–2019
- Succeeded by: Ivan Smith
- In office 1998–2010

Personal details
- Born: December 14, 1938 Montgomery County, Alabama, U.S.
- Died: May 31, 2019 (aged 80) Montgomery, Alabama, U.S.
- Party: Republican (2010–2019)
- Other political affiliations: Democratic (1998–2010)

James M. Martin Sr. (December 14, 1938 – May 31, 2019) was an American politician who served as a Republican member of the Alabama House of Representatives from the 42nd district from 2014 until his death from cancer in 2019. He previously served as a Democrat from 1998 to 2010.
