= Proncey Robertson =

American politician (born 1968)

Member of the Alabama House of Representatives from the 7th district
- In office November 6, 2018 – November 8, 2022
- Preceded by: Ken Johnson
- Succeeded by: Ernie Yarbrough

Personal details
- Born: Proncey David Robertson; February 13, 1968 (age 58)
- Party: Republican
- Spouse: Kristi Robertson (m. 2003)
- Children: 3

Proncey David Robertson (born February 13, 1968) is an American politician from the state of Alabama, serving from 2018 to 2022. He once served as a member of the Alabama House of Representatives for District 7. He is part of the Republican Party.

== Career ==
Robertson was a Sergeant in the United States Air Force from 1986 to 1990. After retiring from the Air Force, he began a career in the police force, becoming an officer with the Russellville Police Department in Russellville, Arkansas. After 4 years in Russellville, Robertson moved to Decatur, Alabama, becoming a Lieutenant in the local police force. He worked in the force for 24 years before running for state office. During his time with the Decatur Police, Robertson won the 2003 American Legion's "Alabama Law Enforcement Officer of the Year" award. Robertson also served as the Lawrence County Republican Party executive committee chairman from 2014 to 2018. Robertson announced his candidacy for State office in 2017. Robertson retired from the Decatur Police to run for State Representative in 2018, winning the Republican primary election unopposed, and defeating his Democratic opponent, Kenneth Brackins, with 75.2% of the vote.

=== Committee Positions ===
Robertson was a member of Education Policy, Public Safety and Homeland Security, and Boards Agencies and Commissions Committees.

== Elections ==
=== Alabama House of Representatives District 7 ===
2018 General Election
| Party | Candidate | Votes | % |
|---|---|---|---|
| Republican | Proncey Robertson | 10,892 | 75.2% |
| Democratic | Kenneth Brackins | 3,592 | 24.8% |
| Write-in | | 9 | 0.1% |
| Total votes | | 14,493 | 100.0% |

2022 Republican Primary Election
| Party | Candidate | Votes | % |
|---|---|---|---|
| Republican | Ernie Yarbrough | 4,303 | 54.2% |
| Republican | Proncey Robertson (Inc.) | 3,631 | 45.8% |
