= Connie Rowe =

American politician

Member of the Alabama House of Representatives from the 13th district
- Incumbent
- Assumed office November 5, 2014
- Preceded by: Bill Roberts

Personal details
- Born: August 15, 1963 (age 62) Jasper, Alabama, U.S.
- Party: Republican
- Spouse: John Rowe
- Children: 1
- Education: Bevill State Community College; University of Alabama, Tuscaloosa (BA)

Connie Cooner Rowe (born c. 1963) is an American politician who has served in the Alabama House of Representatives since 2014. A resident of Jasper, Alabama, she represents district 13 and is a member of the Republican party. She previously worked as a criminal investigator for the Walker County District Attorney's Office and as a law enforcement instructor and trainer. She was serving as the police chief for Jasper when she was elected to the Alabama House of Representatives in 2014. Upon the appointment of Jeff Sessions to be Attorney General of the United States in 2016 by President Donald Trump, Rowe was named as a candidate to replace Sessions in the senate via appointment by Governor Robert Bentley. Bentley eventually appointed Luther Strange.
