= Arnold Mooney =

American politician

Member of the Alabama House of Representatives from the 43rd district
- Incumbent
- Assumed office November 5, 2014
- Preceded by: Mary Sue McClurkin

Personal details
- Born: December 8, 1950 (age 75) Montgomery, Alabama, U.S.
- Party: Republican
- Education: Samford University (BA, MA)

Arnold Mooney (born December 8, 1950) is an American politician. A Republican, he has been in the Alabama House of Representatives from the 43rd district since 2014.

In May 2019, Mooney announced that he would seek the Republican nomination for U.S. Senate seat in Alabama in the 2020 election. He received one percent of the vote in the March 3, 2020 primary.
