= Ginny Shaver =

American politician

Member of the Alabama House of Representatives from the 39th district
- Incumbent
- Assumed office November 6, 2018
- Preceded by: Richard Lindsey

Personal details
- Party: Republican
- Spouse: Jeff Shaver (m. 1981)
- Children: 2

Ginny Shaver is an American politician. She serves as a Republican member of the Alabama House of Representatives for the 39th district. She replaces Richard Lindsey in the seat.
