= Craig Lipscomb =

American politician

Member of the Alabama House of Representatives from the 30th district
- Incumbent
- Assumed office November 7, 2018

Personal details
- Born: Brandon Craig Lipscomb; July 10, 1976 (age 50)
- Party: Republican

Brandon Craig Lipscomb is an American politician who is currently serving in the Alabama House of Representatives. He is a member of the Republican Party.

== External References ==
- B. Craig Lipscomb on ballotpedia
