= Jim Hill (Alabama politician) =

Alabama politician (born 1950)

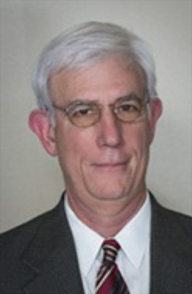

Member of the Alabama House of Representatives from the 50th district
- Incumbent
- Assumed office November 5, 2014

Personal details
- Born: February 26, 1950 (age 76) Starkville, Mississippi, U.S.
- Party: Republican

Jim Hill (born February 26, 1950) is an American politician. He is a member of the Alabama House of Representatives from the 50th district, serving since 2014. He is a member of the Republican Party.
