= Anthony Daniels (politician) =

American politician (born 1982)

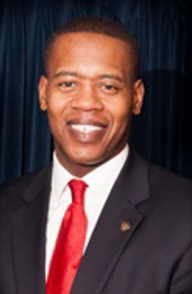

Minority Leader of the Alabama House of Representatives
- Incumbent
- Assumed office February 22, 2017
- Preceded by: Craig Ford

Member of the Alabama House of Representatives from the 53rd district
- Incumbent
- Assumed office November 2014
- Preceded by: Alann Johnson

Personal details
- Born: October 5, 1982 (age 44)
- Party: Democratic
- Education: Alabama A&M University (BA, MA)

Anthony Daniels (born October 5, 1982) is an American politician and member of the Alabama House of Representatives, representing House District 53 since 2014. Since February 22, 2017, Daniels has served as minority leader in the state House of Representatives, leading the House Democratic Caucus.

== Early life and education ==
Daniels taught at several Alabama elementary schools. He graduated cum laude from Alabama A&M University with a bachelor's degree in elementary education in 2005 and later earned a master's degree in special education there.

== Congressional race ==
In November 2023, Daniels announced his candidacy to represent Alabama's 2nd congressional district in the U.S. House of Representatives. He ran as a Democrat in the March 5, 2024, primary election. Daniels lost to Shomari Figures.

Alabama House of Representatives
Preceded by Craig Ford	Minority Leader of the Alabama House of Representatives; 2017–present	Incumbent
