= Ralph Anthony Howard =

American politician

Member of the Alabama House of Representatives from the 72nd district
- In office 2005 – November 9, 2022
- Succeeded by: Curtis Travis

Personal details
- Party: Democratic
- Education: University of Alabama
- Profession: Educator

Ralph Anthony Howard is an American politician. He was a member of the Alabama House of Representatives from the 72nd District, serving from 2005 to 2022. He is a member of the Democratic party.

== Biography ==
Howard has worked at Shelton State Community College as an educator.
