= Jim Carns =

American politician and businessman

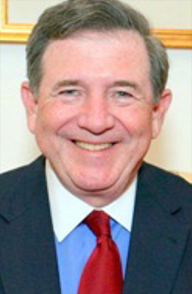

Member of the Alabama House of Representatives from the 48th district
- Incumbent
- Assumed office 2012
- Succeeded by: Lloyd Peeples (elect)
- In office 1990–2006

Personal details
- Born: September 21, 1940 (age 86) Blount County, Alabama, United States
- Party: Republican
- Profession: Businessman and politician

Jim Carns (born September 21, 1940) is an American politician and businessman. He is a Republican member of the Alabama House of Representatives from the 48th District.

== Biography ==
Carns served from 1990 to 2006 in the House when he decided to run for Jefferson County Commissioner and was elected in 2006 serving one term and then ran again for his former House seat in 2012 and presently serves in the Alabama House of Representatives. He chairs the 18-member Jefferson County Legislative Delegation (elected by his peers 4 of his 5 legislative terms). Past Chairman House Republican Caucus, serving as Minority Leader. Past Chairman Industrial Development & Economic Growth. Past member Alabama Economic Development Board and also served on the board of the World Trade Association. He was Chairman of Alabama's Welfare Reform Commission. Carns drafted, sponsored & passed welfare reform legislation in Alabama. Jim wrote, sponsored and passed the first Voter ID legislation in Alabama. He passed landmark legislation that set up the Holocaust Commission. Jim Carns is a member of the Woodlawn High School Hall of Fame. Carns is a University of Alabama graduate with a B.S. in engineering.
