= Ivan Smith (politician) =

American politician

Van Smith

Member of the Alabama House of Representatives from the 42nd district
- Incumbent
- Assumed office November 6, 2019
- Preceded by: Jimmy Martin

Personal details
- Born: Ivan Smith Chilton County, Alabama, U.S.
- Party: Republican
- Education: Auburn University (BS); Alabama A&M University (MS)

Ivan "Van" Smith is an American politician serving as a Republican member of the Alabama House of Representatives from the 42nd district. He assumed office on November 6, 2019.

== Early life and education ==
Smith was born in Chilton County, Alabama. He earned a Bachelor of Science degree in agriscience from Auburn University, a Master of Science in agriscience from Alabama A&M University, and a teaching certificate in administrative education from the University of Montevallo.

== Career ==
Prior to entering politics, Smith worked as an educator for 30 years, including 13 as principal of Billingsley High School. Since 2013, he has worked as a cattle farmer. In November 2019, he was elected to the Alabama House of Representatives in a special election, succeeding Jimmy Martin.
