= Randy Wood (politician) =

American politician (born 1947)

Member of the Alabama House of Representatives from the 36th district
- Incumbent
- Assumed office 2002

Personal details
- Born: March 25, 1947 (age 79) Tift County, Georgia
- Party: Republican
- Profession: businessman

Randy Wood (born March 25, 1947) is an American politician. He is a member of the Alabama House of Representatives from the 36th District, serving since 2002. He is a member of the Republican Party.
