= Ritchie Whorton =

American politician

Member of the Alabama House of Representatives from the 22nd district
- Incumbent
- Assumed office November 5, 2014
- Preceded by: Wayne Johnson

Personal details
- Born: Ritchie Aaron Whorton; March 4, 1960 (age 66) Owens Cross Roads, Alabama
- Party: Republican

Ritchie Aaron Whorton (born March 4, 1960) is an American politician who has served in the Alabama House of Representatives from the 22nd district since 2014.
