= Ernie Yarbrough =

American politician

Member of the Alabama House of Representatives from the 7th district
- Incumbent
- Assumed office November 9, 2022
- Preceded by: Proncey Robertson

Personal details
- Born: Ernie Yarbrough; August 30, 1981 (age 44)
- Party: Republican

Ernie Yarbrough is an American politician from the state of Alabama. He currently serves as a member of the Alabama House of Representatives for District 7. He is a member of the Republican Party.

== Career ==
Prior to Yarbrough's tenure in the Alabama House of Representatives, Yarbrough was raised in rural Lawrence County, Alabama, received a degree in Electrical Engineering from University of Alabama in Huntsville and worked for 10 years at Nucor Steel in Decatur, Alabama.

== Election results ==
=== Alabama House of Representatives District 7 ===
2022 Republican Primary Election
Party	Candidate	Votes	%
Republican	Ernie Yarbrough	4,303	54.2%
Republican	Proncey Robertson (Inc.)	3,631	45.8%

2022 General Election
Party	Candidate	Votes	%
Republican	Ernie Yarbrough	11,225	76.5%
Democratic	Mose Jones Jr.	3,133	21.4%
Libertarian	Marc Durocher	304	2.1%
Write-in		15	0.1%
Total votes		14,662	100.0%
