= Brett Easterbrook =

American politician from Alabama

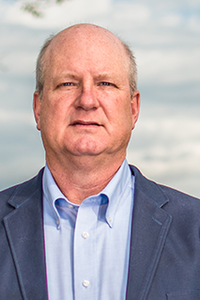

Member of the Alabama House of Representatives from the 65th district
- Incumbent
- Assumed office 2018
- Preceded by: Elaine Beech

Personal details
- Born: October 10, 1963 (age 63) Casper, Wyoming, U.S.
- Party: Republican
- Spouse: Betsy Easterbrook
- Children: 2
- Education: Auburn University, (BS)
- Occupation: Politician

Brett Easterbrook (born October 10, 1963) is an American politician serving as the state representative for Alabama's 65th district. Easterbrook is a member of the Republican Party.

== Early life and education ==
Easterbrook was born in Casper, Wyoming on October 10, 1963. Easterbrook earned a Bachelor of Science degree from Auburn University in 1989.

== Career ==
Before entering politics, Easterbrook worked as an accountant for Mauldin & Jenkins from 1989 to 1991. He then worked as a contractor for Easterbrook Homes from 2005 to 2009.

Currently, he is on the Education Policy Committee, Insurance Committee, State Government Committee, and the Transportation, Infrastructure and Utilities Committee in the Alabama House of Representatives.

== Personal life ==
Easterbrook resides in Fruitdale, Alabama with his wife, Betsy.

In October 2026, Easterbrook was arrested in Escambia County, Alabama and charged with first-degree human trafficking and soliciting prostitution.
