= 2026 Alabama House of Representatives election =

2026 Alabama House of Representatives elections
- November 3, 2026

All 105 seats in the Alabama House of Representatives 53 seats needed for a majority

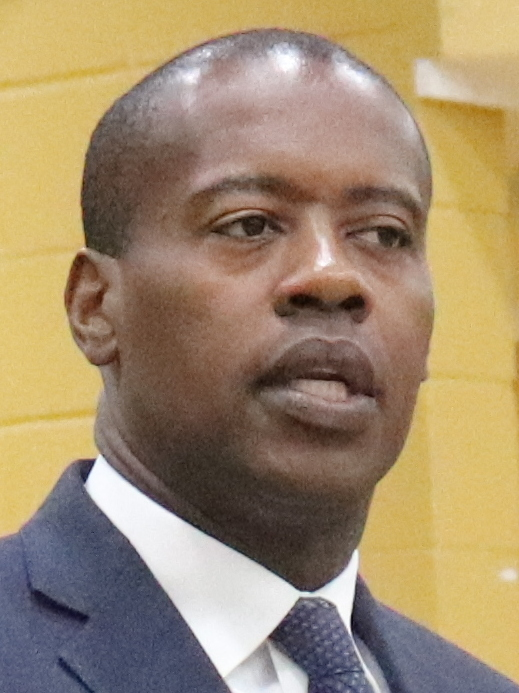
	Majority party	Minority party
Leader	Nathaniel Ledbetter	Anthony Daniels
Party	Republican	Democratic
Leader since	January 10, 2023	February 22, 2017
Leader's seat	24th–Rainsville	53rd–Huntsville
Last election	77 seats, 71.30%	28 seats, 24.79%
Seats before	76	29
Seats won	74	31
Seat change	▼2	▲2
- Map of the incumbents: Republican incumbent Republican incumbent retiring or lost renomination Democratic incumbent Democratic incumbent retiring or lost renomination
Speaker before election
Nathaniel Ledbetter
Republican
Elected Speaker
Nathaniel Ledbetter
Republican

The 2026 Alabama House of Representatives election was held on November 3, 2026. Voters elected members of the Alabama House of Representatives in all 105 of the U.S. state of Alabama's legislative districts to serve a four-year term. Prior to the elections, the Republican Party of Alabama held a supermajority over the Democratic Party of Alabama, controlling 76 seats to their 29. Democrats flipped four seats, gaining two seats on net.

This election took place alongside races for U.S. Senate, U.S. House, governor, state senate, and numerous other state and local offices.

== Background ==
=== Stone v. Allen ===
During the 2020 redistricting cycle, Alabama's congressional and state legislative maps faced legal challenges for alleged violations of Section 2 of the Voting Rights Act of 1965. 27% of Alabama's population is African American, but only 28 of Alabama's house districts, or 23%, were drawn with a black majority. The initial complaint challenged twelve of the senate districts and twenty-one of the state house districts, although the lawsuit was ultimately reduced to four of the senate districts in Huntsville and Montgomery.

== Special elections ==
Ten special elections to the Alabama House of Representatives have been held since the 2022 elections due to vacancies created by early resignations.

=== District 10 ===
On August 31, 2023, Republican David Cole resigned after being charged with voter fraud. Democrat Marilyn Lands, who had lost to Cole in 2022, based her campaign on reproductive rights, opposing Alabama's ban on abortion, as well as supporting in vitro fertilization (IVF) in the aftermath of LePage v. Center for Reproductive Medicine. The decision in that case considered frozen embryos to be children, which many interpreted as a ban on IVF in light of the state's abortion law. The race drew national attention as a result, with many seeing it as an indicator of possible public backlash to the decision. Lands won the election by a wide margin.

2024 Alabama House of Representatives special election, 10th District
Party	Candidate	Votes	%
Democratic	Marilyn Lands	3,715	62.3%
Republican	Teddy Powell	2,236	37.5%
Write-in		11	0.2%
Total votes		5,962	100
Democratic gain from Republican			

== Retirements ==
=== Democrats ===
1. District 32: Barbara Boyd is retiring.
2. District 74: Phillip Ensler is retiring to run for lieutenant governor

=== Republicans ===
1. District 8: Terri Collins is retiring
2. District 17: Tracy Estes is retiring.
3. District 37: Bob Fincher is retiring
4. District 50: Jim Hill is retiring
5. District 65: Brett Easterbrook is retiring to run for state senate
6. District 91: Rhett Marques is retiring to run for U.S. house

== Incumbents defeated ==
=== In primary elections ===
==== Democrats ====
1. District 52: Kelvin Datcher lost renomination to Gigi Hayes
2. District 60: Juandalynn Givan lost renomination to Alicia Escott Lumpkin

==== Republicans ====
1. District 1: Phillip Pettus lost renomination to Maurice McCaney
2. District 13: Greg Barnes lost renomination to Mike Elliott
3. District 48: Jim Carns lost renomination to Lloyd Peeples
4. District 96: Matt Simpson lost renomination to Danielle Duggar

== Predictions ==
Source	Ranking	As of
Sabato's Crystal Ball	Safe R	January 22, 2026

== Summary ==
=== By district ===
District		Incumbent				Candidates
Number	2024 Pres.	Member	Party	First elected	Status	Candidates
1st	R+48.84	Phillip Pettus	Republican	2014	Incumbent lost renomination. Republican hold.	▌ ✓ Maurice McCaney (Republican)
2nd	R+66.03	Ben Harrison	Republican	2022	Incumbent re-elected.	▌ ✓ Ben Harrison (Republican); ▌Rick Pressnell (Democratic)
3rd	R+30.57	Kerry Underwood	Republican	2022	Incumbent re-elected.	▌ ✓ Kerry Underwood (Republican)
4th	R+32.64	Parker Moore	Republican	2018 (sp)	Incumbent re-elected.	▌ ✓ Parker Moore (Republican); ▌Hanu Karlapalem (Democratic)
5th	R+44.52	Danny Crawford	Republican	2016	Incumbent re-elected.	▌ ✓ Danny Crawford (Republican); ▌Jessie Barcala (Democratic)
6th	R+29.97	Andy Whitt	Republican	2018	Incumbent re-elected.	▌ ✓ Andy Whitt (Republican)
7th	R+56.98	Ernie Yarbrough	Republican	2022	Incumbent re-elected.	▌ ✓ Ernie Yarbrough (Republican); ▌Angelo Mancuso (Independent); ▌Trent Ford (Independent)
8th	R+28.47	Terri Collins	Republican	2010	Incumbent retired. Republican hold.	▌ ✓ Patrick Johnson (Republican); ▌Janine Jordan (Democratic)
9th	R+71.69	Scott Stadthagen	Republican	2018	Incumbent re-elected.	▌ ✓ Scott Stadthagen (Republican)
10th	EVEN	Marilyn Lands	Democratic	2024 (sp)	Incumbent re-elected.	▌ ✓ Marilyn Lands (Democratic); ▌Aaron Thomas (Republican)
11th	R+82.18	Heath Allbright	Republican	2025 (sp)	Incumbent re-elected.	▌ ✓ Heath Allbright (Republican)
12th	R+78.39	Cindy Myrex	Republican	2025 (sp)	Incumbent re-elected.	▌ ✓ Cindy Myrex (Republican)
13th	R+70.71	Greg Barnes	Republican	2025 (sp)	Incumbent lost renomination. Republican hold.	▌ ✓ Mike Elliott (Republican)
14th	R+81.15	Tim Wadsworth	Republican	2014	Incumbent re-elected.	▌ ✓ Tim Wadsworth (Republican)
15th	R+15.85	Leigh Hulsey	Republican	2022	Incumbent lost re-election. Democratic gain.	▌ ✓ Nell Brown (Democratic); ▌Leigh Hulsey (Republican)
16th	R+75.8	Bryan Brinyark	Republican	2024 (sp)	Incumbent re-elected.	▌ ✓ Bryan Brinyark (Republican); ▌Christian Martin (Democratic)
17th	R+79.77	Tracy Estes	Republican	2018	Incumbent retired. Republican hold.	▌ ✓ Phil Segraves (Republican)
18th	R+71.63	Jamie Kiel	Republican	2018	Incumbent re-elected.	▌ ✓ Jamie Kiel (Republican)
19th	D+31.8	Laura Hall	Democratic	1993 (sp)	Incumbent re-elected.	▌ ✓ Laura Hall (Democratic); ▌Donald Barnes (Republican)
20th	R+24.15	James Lomax	Republican	2022	Incumbent re-elected.	▌ ✓ James Lomax (Republican); ▌James Linderholm (Democratic)
21st	R+19.09	Rex Reynolds	Republican	2018 (sp)	Incumbent re-elected.	▌ ✓ Rex Reynolds (Republican); ▌Forrest Satterfield (Democratic)
22nd	R+48.89	Ritchie Whorton	Republican	2014	Incumbent re-elected.	▌ ✓ Ritchie Whorton (Republican)
23rd	R+71.19	Mike Kirkland	Republican	2022	Incumbent re-elected.	▌ ✓ Mike Kirkland (Republican)
24th	R+72.73	Nathaniel Ledbetter	Republican	2014	Incumbent re-elected.	▌ ✓ Nathaniel Ledbetter (Republican)
25th	R+5.17	Phillip Rigsby	Republican	2022	Incumbent lost re-election. Democratic gain.	▌ ✓ Allison Montgomery (Democratic); ▌Phillip Rigsby (Republican)
26th	R+72.75	Brock Colvin	Republican	2022	Incumbent re-elected.	▌ ✓ Brock Colvin (Republican)
27th	R+70.69	Jeana Ross	Republican	2024 (sp)	Incumbent re-elected.	▌ ✓ Jeana Ross (Republican)
28th	R+26.8	Mack Butler	Republican	2022	Incumbent re-elected.	▌ ✓ Mack Butler (Republican); ▌Robert Louis Hunter (Democratic)
29th	R+73.36	Mark Gidley	Republican	2022	Incumbent re-elected.	▌ ✓ Mark Gidley (Republican)
30th	R+76.25	Craig Lipscomb	Republican	2012	Incumbent re-elected.	▌ ✓ Craig Lipscomb (Republican)
31st	R+60.7	Troy Stubbs	Republican	2022	Incumbent re-elected.	▌ ✓ Troy Stubbs (Republican)
32nd	D+1.57	Barbara Boyd	Democratic	1994	Incumbent retired. Democratic hold.	▌ ✓ Debra Foster (Democratic); ▌Joey Callahan (Republican)
33rd	R+38.9	Ben Robbins	Republican	2021 (sp)	Incumbent re-elected.	▌ ✓ Ben Robbins (Republican)
34th	R+80.36	David Standridge	Republican	2012	Incumbent re-elected.	▌ ✓ David Standridge (Republican)
35th	R+58.44	Steve Hurst	Republican	1998	Incumbent re-elected.	▌ ✓ Steve Hurst (Republican); ▌Joseph Cleveland (Independent)
36th	R+47.89	Randy Wood	Republican	2002	Incumbent re-elected.	▌ ✓ Randy Wood (Republican)
37th	R+45.55	Bob Fincher	Republican	2014	Incumbent retired. Republican hold.	▌ ✓ Jeff Monroe (Republican); ▌Michelle French (Democratic)
38th	R+43.08	Kristin Nelson	Republican	2026 (sp)	Incumbent re-elected.	▌ ✓ Kristin Nelson (Republican); ▌Hazel Floyd (Democratic)
39th	R+75.8	Ginny Shaver	Republican	2018	Incumbent re-elected.	▌ ✓ Ginny Shaver (Republican)
40th	R+62.23	Chad Robertson	Republican	2022	Incumbent re-elected.	▌ ✓ Chad Robertson (Republican); ▌Pam Howard (Democratic)
41st	R+46.36	Corley Ellis	Republican	2016	Incumbent re-elected.	▌ ✓ Corley Ellis (Republican); ▌David Morgan (Democratic)
42nd	R+71.42	Ivan Smith	Republican	2019 (sp)	Incumbent re-elected.	▌ ✓ Ivan Smith (Republican)
43rd	R+42.3	Arnold Mooney	Republican	2014	Incumbent re-elected.	▌ ✓ Arnold Mooney (Republican); ▌Taylor Cook (Democratic)
44th	R+26.85	Danny Garrett	Republican	2014	Incumbent re-elected.	▌ ✓ Danny Garrett (Republican)
45th	R+43.1	Susan DuBose	Republican	2022	Incumbent re-elected.	▌ ✓ Susan DuBose (Republican); ▌Toni Kornegay Vaughn (Democratic)
46th	R+17.87	David Faulkner	Republican	2014	Incumbent re-elected.	▌ ✓ David Faulkner (Republican)
47th	R+15.46	Mike Shaw	Republican	2022	Incumbent re-elected.	▌ ✓ Mike Shaw (Republican); ▌Jim Toomey (Democratic)
48th	R+33.48	Jim Carns	Republican	2011 (sp)	Incumbent lost renomination. Republican hold.	▌ ✓ Lloyd Peeples (Republican)
49th	R+49.09	Russell Bedsole	Republican	2020 (sp)	Incumbent re-elected.	▌ ✓ Russell Bedsole (Republican)
50th	R+59.76	Jim Hill	Republican	2014	Incumbent retired. Republican hold.	▌ ✓ Bill Morris (Republican); ▌Alan Thomas (Democratic)
51st	R+59.12	Allen Treadaway	Republican	2006	Incumbent re-elected.	▌ ✓ Allen Treadaway (Republican)
52nd	D+66.74	Kelvin Datcher	Democratic	2024 (sp)	Incumbent lost renomination. Democratic hold.	▌ ✓ GiGi Harris (Democratic)
53rd	D+42.12	Anthony Daniels	Democratic	2014	Incumbent re-elected.	▌ ✓ Anthony Daniels (Democratic)
54th	D+58.31	Neil Rafferty	Democratic	2018	Incumbent re-elected.	▌ ✓ Neil Rafferty (Democratic)
55th	D+72.54	Travis Hendrix	Democratic	2023 (sp)	Incumbent re-elected.	▌ ✓ Travis Hendrix (Democratic)
56th	D+44.91	Ontario Tillman	Democratic	2022	Incumbent re-elected.	▌ ✓ Ontario Tillman (Democratic)
57th	D+32.32	Patrick Sellers	Democratic	2022	Incumbent re-elected.	▌ ✓ Patrick Sellers (Democratic)
58th	D+56.63	Rolanda Hollis	Democratic	2017 (sp)	Incumbent re-elected.	▌ ✓ Rolanda Hollis (Democratic)
59th	D+65.25	Mary Moore	Democratic	2002	Incumbent re-elected.	▌ ✓ Mary Moore (Democratic)
60th	D+48.78	Juandalynn Givan	Democratic	2010	Incumbent lost renomination. Democratic hold.	▌ ✓ Alicia Escott Lumpkin (Democratic)
61st	R+47.13	Ron Bolton	Republican	2022	Incumbent re-elected.	▌ ✓ Ron Bolton (Republican)
62nd	R+41.27	Bill Lamb	Republican	2022	Incumbent re-elected.	▌ ✓ Bill Lamb (Republican)
63rd	R+16.77	Norman Crow	Republican	2026 (sp)	Incumbent re-elected.	▌ ✓ Norman Crow (Republican); ▌Judith Taylor (Democratic)
64th	R+63.92	Donna Givens	Republican	2022	Incumbent re-elected.	▌ ✓ Donna Givens (Republican)
65th	R+43.72	Brett Easterbrook	Republican	2018	Incumbent retired. Republican hold.	▌ ✓ John Knapp (Republican); ▌Elaine Beech (Independent)
66th	R+57.82	Alan Baker	Republican	2006	Incumbent re-elected.	▌ ✓ Alan Baker (Republican)
67th	D+32.21	Prince Chestnut	Democratic	2017 (sp)	Incumbent re-elected.	▌ ✓ Prince Chestnut (Democratic)
68th	D+0.41	Thomas Jackson	Democratic	1994	Incumbent re-elected.	▌ ✓ Thomas Jackson (Democratic); ▌Fred Kelley (Republican)
69th	D+8.22	Kelvin Lawrence	Democratic	2014	Incumbent re-elected.	▌ ✓ Kelvin Lawrence (Democratic); ▌Josh Pendergrass (Republican)
70th	D+38.37	Christopher J. England	Democratic	2006	Incumbent re-elected.	▌ ✓ Christopher J. England (Democratic); ▌Ian M. Chwatuk (Republican)
71st	D+11.48	Artis J. McCampbell	Democratic	2006	Incumbent re-elected.	▌ ✓ Artis J. McCampbell (Democratic)
72nd	D+11.07	Curtis Travis	Democratic	2022	Incumbent re-elected.	▌ ✓ Curtis Travis (Democratic)
73rd	R+28.48	Kenneth Paschal	Republican	2021 (sp)	Incumbent re-elected.	▌ ✓ Kenneth Paschal (Republican)
74th	D+28.96	Phillip Ensler	Democratic	2022	Incumbent retired to run for lieutenant governor. Democratic hold.	▌ ✓ Jasmyne Crimiel (Democratic); ▌Alva Lambert (Republican)
75th	R+27.55	Reed Ingram	Republican	2014	Incumbent re-elected.	▌ ✓ Reed Ingram (Republican); ▌Tisha Dickson Nickson (Democratic)
76th	D+51.99	Patrice McClammy	Democratic	2022 (sp)	Incumbent re-elected.	▌ ✓ Patrice McClammy (Democratic)
77th	D+46.26	Tashina Morris	Democratic	2018	Incumbent re-elected.	▌ ✓ Tashina Morris (Democratic)
78th	D+38.98	Kenyatté Hassell	Democratic	2021 (sp)	Incumbent re-elected.	▌ ✓ Kenyatté Hassell (Democratic)
79th	R+22.71	Joe Lovvorn	Republican	2016	Incumbent re-elected.	▌ ✓ Joe Lovvorn (Republican)
80th	R+34.1	Chris Blackshear	Republican	2016	Incumbent re-elected.	▌ ✓ Chris Blackshear (Republican); ▌Manfred Malone (Democratic)
81st	R+47.6	Ed Oliver	Republican	2018	Incumbent re-elected.	▌ ✓ Ed Oliver (Republican)
82nd	D+30.74	Pebblin Warren	Democratic	2005 (sp)	Incumbent re-elected.	▌ ✓ Pebblin Warren (Democratic); ▌Kinsley Hammons (Republican)
83rd	D+2.72	Jeremy Gray	Democratic	2018	Incumbent re-elected.	▌ ✓ Jeremy Gray (Democratic)
84th	D+5.49	Berry Forte	Democratic	2010	Incumbent re-elected.	▌ ✓ Berry Forte (Democratic)
85th	R+26.16	Rick Rehm	Republican	2022	Incumbent re-elected.	▌ ✓ Rick Rehm (Republican); ▌Aristotle Onassis Kirkland (Democratic)
86th	R+57.77	Paul Lee	Republican	2010	Incumbent re-elected.	▌ ✓ Paul Lee (Republican)
87th	R+72.04	Jeff Sorrells	Republican	2018	Incumbent re-elected.	▌ ✓ Jeff Sorrells (Republican)
88th	R+37.95	Jerry Starnes	Republican	2022	Incumbent re-elected.	▌ ✓ Jerry Starnes (Republican)
89th	R+33.85	Marcus Paramore	Republican	2022	Incumbent re-elected.	▌ ✓ Marcus Paramore (Republican)
90th	R+41.79	Chris Sells	Republican	2014	Incumbent re-elected.	▌ ✓ Chris Sells (Republican)
91st	R+52.53	Rhett Marques	Republican	2018	Incumbent retired to run for U.S. House. Republican hold.	▌ ✓ Jody Linton (Republican)
92nd	R+71.74	Matthew Hammett	Republican	2022	Incumbent re-elected.	▌ ✓ Matthew Hammett (Republican)
93rd	R+49.81	Steve Clouse	Republican	1994	Incumbent re-elected.	▌ ✓ Steve Clouse (Republican)
94th	R+53.27	Jennifer Fidler	Republican	2022	Incumbent re-elected.	▌ ✓ Jennifer Fidler (Republican)
95th	R+63.18	Frances Holk-Jones	Republican	2022	Incumbent re-elected.	▌ ✓ Frances Holk-Jones (Republican)
96th	R+44.7	Matt Simpson	Republican	2018	Incumbent lost renomination. Republican hold.	▌ ✓ Danielle Duggar (Republican); ▌Terri Osborne (Democratic)
97th	D+26.85	Adline Clarke	Democratic	2013 (sp)	Incumbent re-elected.	▌ ✓ Adline Clarke (Democratic)
98th	D+4.39	Napoleon Bracy Jr.	Democratic	2010	Incumbent re-elected.	▌ ✓ Napoleon Bracy Jr. (Democratic)
99th	D+28.17	Sam Jones	Democratic	2018	Incumbent re-elected.	▌ ✓ Sam Jones (Democratic); ▌Charlie Watts (Republican)
100th	R+40.37	Mark Shirey	Republican	2022	Incumbent re-elected.	▌ ✓ Mark Shirey (Republican)
101st	R+28.9	Chris Pringle	Republican	2014	Incumbent re-elected.	▌ ✓ Chris Pringle (Republican); ▌Joan Friedlander (Democratic)
102nd	R+65.33	Shane Stringer	Republican	2018	Incumbent re-elected.	▌ ✓ Shane Stringer (Republican)
103rd	D+28.65	Barbara Drummond	Democratic	2014	Incumbent re-elected.	▌ ✓ Barbara Drummond (Democratic)
104th	R+24.07	Margie Wilcox	Republican	2014	Incumbent re-elected.	▌ ✓ Margie Wilcox (Republican)
105th	R+61.4	Chip Brown	Republican	2018	Incumbent re-elected.	▌ ✓ Chip Brown (Republican)

== District 1 ==
=== Republican primary ===
==== Candidates ====
===== Nominee =====
- Maurice McCaney, candidate for this seat in 2022

===== Eliminated in primary =====
- Phillip Pettus, incumbent representative

==== Endorsements ====
Phillip Pettus

Organizations

- Alabama Realtors PAC
- Business Council of Alabama
- Manufacture Alabama
- National Rifle Association Political Victory Fund

==== Results ====
Republican primary
Party	Candidate	Votes	%
Republican	Maurice McCaney	2,907	59.24
Republican	Phillip Pettus (incumbent)	2,000	40.76
Total votes		4,907	100.00

=== General election ===
==== Results ====
2026 Alabama's 1st House of Representatives district election
Party	Candidate	Votes	%
Republican	Maurice McCaney		
Write-in			
Total votes			100.00

== District 2 ==
=== Republican primary ===
==== Candidates ====
===== Nominee =====
- Ben Harrison, incumbent representative

==== Endorsements ====
Ben Harrison

Organizations

- Alabama Farmers Federation
- Alabama Realtors PAC

=== Democratic primary ===
==== Candidates ====
===== Nominee =====
- Rick Pressnell

=== General election ===
==== Results ====
2026 Alabama's 2nd House of Representatives district election
Party	Candidate	Votes	%
Republican	Ben Harrison (incumbent		
Democratic	Rick Pressnell		
Write-in			
Total votes			100.00

== District 3 ==
=== Republican primary ===
==== Candidates ====
===== Nominee =====
- Kerry Underwood, incumbent representative

==== Endorsements ====
Kerry Underwood

Organizations

- Alabama Realtors PAC
- Business Council of Alabama
- Manufacture Alabama

=== General election ===
==== Results ====
2026 Alabama's 3rd House of Representatives district election
Party	Candidate	Votes	%
Republican	Kerry Underwood (incumbent)		
Write-in			
Total votes			100.00

== District 4 ==
=== Republican primary ===
==== Candidates ====
===== Nominee =====
- Parker Moore, incumbent representative

==== Endorsements ====
Parker Moore

Organizations

- Alabama Realtors PAC
- Business Council of Alabama
- Manufacture Alabama

=== Democratic primary ===
==== Candidates ====
===== Nominee =====
- Hanu Karlapalem, small business owner and candidate for mayor of Madison in 2016

=== General election ===
==== Results ====
2026 Alabama's 4th House of Representatives district election
Party	Candidate	Votes	%
Republican	Parker Moore (incumbent)		
Democratic	Hanu Karlapalem		
Write-in			
Total votes			100.00

== District 5 ==
=== Republican primary ===
==== Candidates ====
===== Nominee =====
- Danny Crawford, incumbent representative

==== Endorsements ====
Danny Crawford

Organizations

- Alabama Realtors PAC
- Business Council of Alabama
- Manufacture Alabama

=== Democratic primary ===
==== Candidates ====
===== Nominee =====
- Jessie Barcala, retired public safety official

=== General election ===
==== Results ====
2026 Alabama's 5th House of Representatives district election
Party	Candidate	Votes	%
Republican	Danny Crawford (incumbent)		
Democratic	Jessie Barcala		
Write-in			
Total votes			100.00

== District 6 ==
=== Republican primary ===
==== Candidates ====
===== Nominee =====
- Andy Whitt, incumbent representative

==== Endorsements ====
Andy Whitt

Organizations

- Alabama Realtors PAC
- Business Council of Alabama
- Manufacture Alabama

=== General election ===
==== Results ====
2026 Alabama's 6th House of Representatives district election
Party	Candidate	Votes	%
Republican	Andy Whitt (incumbent)		
Write-in			
Total votes			100.00

== District 7 ==
=== Republican primary ===
==== Candidates ====
===== Nominee =====
- Ernie Yarbrough, incumbent representative

===== Disqualified =====
- Doc Mancuso, former Democratic state representative (1999–2003)

==== Endorsements ====
Ernie Yarbrough

Organizations

- Alabama Farmers Federation
- Alabama Realtors PAC

=== Independent candidates ===
==== Declared ====
- Trent Ford
- Doc Mancuso, former Democratic state representative (1999–2003)

=== General election ===
==== Results ====
2026 Alabama's 7th House of Representatives district election
Party	Candidate	Votes	%
Republican	Ernie Yarbrough (incumbent)		
Independent	Trent Ford		
Independent	Doc Mancuso		
Write-in			
Total votes			100.00

== District 8 ==
=== Republican primary ===
==== Candidates ====
===== Nominee =====
- Patrick Johnson, candidate for this seat in 2022

===== Eliminated in primary =====
- Kevin Davenport

===== Declined =====
- Terri Collins, incumbent representative

==== Endorsements ====
Terri Collins (declined)

Organizations

- Business Council of Alabama
Patrick Johnson

State representatives

- Terri Collins, incumbent representative

Organizations

- Alabama Realtors PAC

==== Results ====
Republican primary
Party	Candidate	Votes	%
Republican	Patrick Johnson	2,317	66.43
Republican	Kevin Davenport	1,171	33.57
Total votes		3,488	100.00

=== Democratic primary ===
==== Candidates ====
===== Nominee =====
- Bruce Sparkman

=== General election ===
==== Results ====
2026 Alabama's 8th House of Representatives district election
Party	Candidate	Votes	%
Republican	Patrick Johnson		
Democratic	Bruce Sparkman		
Write-in			
Total votes			100.00

== District 9 ==
=== Republican primary ===
==== Candidates ====
===== Nominee =====
- Scott Stadthagen, incumbent representative

==== Endorsements ====
Scott Stadthagen

Organizations

- Alabama Farmers Federation
- Alabama Forestry Association
- Alabama Realtors PAC
- Business Council of Alabama
- Manufacture Alabama

=== General election ===
==== Results ====
2026 Alabama's 9th House of Representatives district election
Party	Candidate	Votes	%
Republican	Scott Stadthagen (incumbent)		
Write-in			
Total votes			100.00

== District 10 ==
=== Democratic primary ===
==== Candidates ====
===== Nominee =====
- Marilyn Lands, incumbent representative

==== Endorsements ====
Marilyn Lands

Organizations

- Alabama Realtors PAC

=== Republican primary ===
==== Candidates ====
===== Nominee =====
- Aaron Thomas, small business owner

==== Endorsements ====
Aaron Thomas

Organizations

- Alabama Farmers Federation

=== General election ===
==== Results ====
2026 Alabama's 10th House of Representatives district election
Party	Candidate	Votes	%
Democratic	Marilyn Lands (incumbent)		
Republican	Aaron Thomas		
Write-in			
Total votes			100.00

== District 11 ==
=== Republican primary ===
==== Candidates ====
===== Nominee =====
- Heath Allbright, incumbent representative

==== Endorsements ====
Heath Allbright

Organizations

- Alabama Realtors PAC
- Business Council of Alabama
- Manufacture Alabama

=== General election ===
==== Results ====
2026 Alabama's 11th House of Representatives district election
Party	Candidate	Votes	%
Republican	Heath Allbright (incumbent)		
Write-in			
Total votes			100.00

== District 12 ==
=== Republican primary ===
==== Candidates ====
===== Nominee =====
- Cindy Myrex, incumbent representative

==== Endorsements ====
Cindy Myrex

Organizations

- Alabama Realtors PAC
- Manufacture Alabama

=== General election ===
==== Results ====
2026 Alabama's 12th House of Representatives district election
Party	Candidate	Votes	%
Republican	Cindy Myrex (incumbent)		
Write-in			
Total votes			100.00

== District 13 ==
=== Republican primary ===
==== Candidates ====
===== Nominee =====
- Mike Elliott, educator and disqualified candidate for this district in the January 2026 special election

===== Eliminated in primary =====
- Greg Barnes, incumbent representative

==== Endorsements ====
Greg Barnes

State representatives

- Nathaniel Ledbetter, speaker of the Alabama House of Representatives (2023–present) from the 24th district (2014–present)
- Paul Lee, state representative from the 86th district (2010–present)

Organizations

- Alabama Realtors PAC
- National Rifle Association Political Victory Fund
Mike Elliott

Organizations

- Alabama Farmers Federation

==== Results ====
Republican primary
Party	Candidate	Votes	%
Republican	Mike Elliott	5,875	57.67
Republican	Greg Barnes (incumbent)	4,312	42.33
Total votes		10,187	100.00

=== General election ===
==== Results ====
2026 Alabama's 13th House of Representatives district election
Party	Candidate	Votes	%
Republican	Mike Elliott		
Write-in			
Total votes			100.00

== District 14 ==
=== Republican primary ===
==== Candidates ====
===== Nominee =====
- Tim Wadsworth, incumbent representative

==== Endorsements ====
Tim Wadsworth

Organizations

- Alabama Realtors PAC

=== General election ===
==== Results ====
2026 Alabama's 14th House of Representatives district election
Party	Candidate	Votes	%
Republican	Tim Wadsworth		
Write-in			
Total votes			100.00

== District 15 ==
=== Republican primary ===
==== Candidates ====
===== Nominee =====
- Leigh Hulsey, incumbent representative

==== Endorsements ====
Leigh Hulsey

Organizations

- Alabama Realtors PAC
- Business Council of Alabama
- Manufacture Alabama

=== Democratic primary ===
==== Candidates ====
===== Nominee =====
- Nell Brown, law student

=== General election ===
==== Results ====
2026 Alabama's 15th House of Representatives district election
Party	Candidate	Votes	%
Republican	Leigh Hulsey (incumbent)		
Democratic	Nell Brown		
Write-in			
Total votes			100.00

== District 16 ==
=== Republican primary ===
==== Candidates ====
===== Nominee =====
- Bryan Brinyark, incumbent representative

==== Endorsements ====
Bryan Brinyark

Organizations

- Alabama Farmers Federation
- Alabama Realtors PAC
- Business Council of Alabama
- Manufacture Alabama

=== Democratic primary ===
==== Candidates ====
===== Nominee =====
- Christian Martin

=== General election ===
==== Results ====
2026 Alabama's 16th House of Representatives district election
Party	Candidate	Votes	%
Republican	Bryan Brinyark		
Democratic	Christian Martin		
Write-in			
Total votes			100.00

== District 17 ==
=== Republican primary ===
==== Candidates ====
===== Advanced to runoff =====
- Micheal Beck, former teacher and coach
- Phil Segraves, mayor of Guin

===== Eliminated in primary =====
- Kevin Bradford, insurance agent

===== Declined =====
- Tracy Estes, incumbent representative

==== Results ====
Republican primary
Party	Candidate	Votes	%
Republican	Phil Segraves	3,616	49.73
Republican	Micheal Beck	1,935	26.61
Republican	Kevin Bradford	1,720	23.66
Total votes		7,271	100.00

==== Runoff ====
===== Results =====
Republican primary runoff
Party	Candidate	Votes	%
Republican	Phil Segraves		
Republican	Micheal Beck		
Total votes			100.00

=== General election ===
==== Results ====
2026 Alabama's 17th House of Representatives district election
Party	Candidate	Votes	%
Republican	Phil Segraves		
Write-in			
Total votes			100.00

== District 18 ==
=== Republican primary ===
==== Candidates ====
===== Nominee =====
- Jamie Kiel, incumbent representative

==== Endorsements ====
Jamie Kiel

Organizations

- Alabama Realtors PAC
- Business Council of Alabama
- Manufacture Alabama

=== General election ===
==== Results ====
2026 Alabama's 18th House of Representatives district election
Party	Candidate	Votes	%
Republican	Jamie Kiel (incumbent)		
Write-in			
Total votes			100.00

== District 19 ==
=== Democratic primary ===
==== Candidates ====
===== Nominee =====
- Laura Hall, incumbent representative

==== Endorsements ====
Laura Hall

Organizations

- Alabama Realtors PAC
- Business Council of Alabama
- Manufacture Alabama

=== Republican primary ===
==== Candidates ====
===== Nominee =====
- Donald Barnes

=== General election ===
==== Results ====
2026 Alabama's 19th House of Representatives district election
Party	Candidate	Votes	%
Democratic	Laura Hall		
Republican	Donald Barnes		
Write-in			
Total votes			100.00

== District 20 ==
=== Republican primary ===
==== Candidates ====
===== Nominee =====
- James Lomax, incumbent representative

===== Eliminated in primary =====
- Mo Brooks, former U.S. representative from Alabama's 5th congressional district (2011–2023) and candidate for U.S. Senate in 2017 and 2022

==== Endorsements ====
Mo Brooks

Organizations

- National Association for Gun Rights
James Lomax

Local officials

- Tommy Battle, mayor of Huntsville (2008–present)

Organizations

- Alabama Farmers Federation
- Alabama Realtors PAC
- Americans for Prosperity
- Business Council of Alabama
- Manufacture Alabama
- National Rifle Association Political Victory Fund

==== Results ====
Republican primary
Party	Candidate	Votes	%
Republican	James Lomax (incumbent)	4,465	60.67
Republican	Mo Brooks	2,894	39.33
Total votes		7,359	100.00

=== Democratic primary ===
==== Candidates ====
===== Nominee =====
- James Linderholm

=== General election ===
==== Results ====
2026 Alabama's 20th House of Representatives district election
Party	Candidate	Votes	%
Republican	James Lomax (incumbent)		
Democratic	James Linderholm		
Write-in			
Total votes			100.00

== District 21 ==
=== Republican primary ===
==== Candidates ====
===== Nominee =====
- Rex Reynolds, incumbent representative

==== Endorsements ====
Rex Reynold

Organizations

- Alabama Farmers Federation
- Alabama Realtors PAC
- Business Council of Alabama
- Manufacture Alabama

=== Democratic primary ===
==== Candidates ====
===== Nominee =====
- Forrest Satterfield

=== General election ===
==== Results ====
2026 Alabama's 21st House of Representatives district election
Party	Candidate	Votes	%
Republican	Rex Reynolds (incumbent)		
Democratic	Forrest Satterfield		
Write-in			
Total votes			100.00

== District 22 ==
=== Republican primary ===
==== Candidates ====
===== Nominee =====
- Ritchie Whorton, incumbent representative

==== Endorsements ====
Ritchie Whorton

Organizations

- Alabama Realtors PAC

=== General election ===
==== Results ====
2026 Alabama's 22nd House of Representatives district election
Party	Candidate	Votes	%
Republican	Ritchie Whorton (incumbent)		
Write-in			
Total votes			100.00

== District 23 ==
=== Republican primary ===
==== Candidates ====
===== Nominee =====
- Mike Kirkland, incumbent representative

==== Endorsements ====
Mike Kirkland

Organizations

- Alabama Farmers Federation
- Alabama Realtors PAC
- Business Council of Alabama
- Manufacture Alabama

=== General election ===
==== Results ====
2026 Alabama's 23rd House of Representatives district election
Party	Candidate	Votes	%
Republican	Mike Kirkland (incumbent)		
Write-in			
Total votes			100.00

== District 24 ==
=== Republican primary ===
==== Candidates ====
===== Nominee =====
- Nathaniel Ledbetter, incumbent representative

==== Endorsements ====
Nathaniel Ledbetter

Organizations

- Alabama Forestry Association
- Alabama Realtors PAC
- Electric Cooperatives of Alabama
- Manufacture Alabama

=== General election ===
==== Results ====
2026 Alabama's 24th House of Representatives district election
Party	Candidate	Votes	%
Republican	Nathaniel Ledbetter (incumbent)		
Write-in			
Total votes			100.00

== District 25 ==
=== Republican primary ===
==== Candidates ====
===== Nominee =====
- Phillip Rigsby, incumbent representative

==== Endorsements ====
Phillip Rigsby

Organizations

- Alabama Farmers Federation
- Alabama Realtors PAC

=== Democratic primary ===
==== Candidates ====
===== Nominee =====
- Allison Montgomery

===== Eliminated in primary =====
- Damon Eubanks

==== Results ====
Democratic primary
Party	Candidate	Votes	%
Democratic	Allison T Montgomery	2,858	67.90
Democratic	Damon Eubanks	1,351	32.10
Total votes		4,209	100.00

=== General election ===
==== Results ====
2026 Alabama's 25th House of Representatives district election
Party	Candidate	Votes	%
Republican	Phillip Rigsby (incumbent)		
Democratic	Allison Montgomery		
Write-in			
Total votes			100.00

== District 26 ==
=== Republican primary ===
==== Candidates ====
===== Nominee =====
- Brock Colvin, incumbent representative

==== Endorsements ====
Brock Colvin

Statewide officials

- Will Ainsworth, Lieutenant Governor of Alabama (2019–present)

Organizations

- Alabama Farmers Federation
- Alabama Realtors PAC
- Manufacture Alabama

=== General election ===
==== Results ====
2026 Alabama's 26th House of Representatives district election
Party	Candidate	Votes	%
Republican	Brock Colvin (incumbent)		
Write-in			
Total votes			100.00

== District 27 ==
=== Republican primary ===
==== Candidates ====
===== Nominee =====
- Jeana Ross, incumbent representative

==== Endorsements ====
Jeana Ross

Organizations

- Alabama Farmers Federation
- Alabama Realtors PAC
- Business Council of Alabama
- Manufacture Alabama

=== General election ===
==== Results ====
2026 Alabama's 27th House of Representatives district election
Party	Candidate	Votes	%
Republican	Jeana Ross (incumbent)		
Write-in			
Total votes			100.00

== District 28 ==
=== Republican primary ===
==== Candidates ====
===== Nominee =====
- Mack Butler, incumbent representative

==== Endorsements ====
Mack Butler

Organizations

- Alabama Realtors PAC

=== Democratic primary ===
==== Candidates ====
===== Nominee =====
- Robert Hunter, community organizer

==== Endorsements ====
Robert Hunter

Organizations

- Democratic Socialists of America

=== General election ===
==== Results ====
2026 Alabama's 28th House of Representatives district election
Party	Candidate	Votes	%
Republican	Mack Butler (incumbent)		
Democratic	Robert Hunter		
Write-in			
Total votes			100.00

== District 29 ==
=== Republican primary ===
==== Candidates ====
===== Nominee =====
- Mark Gidley, incumbent representative

==== Endorsements ====
Mark Gidley

Organizations

- Alabama Realtors PAC

=== General election ===
==== Results ====
2026 Alabama's 29th House of Representatives district election
Party	Candidate	Votes	%
Republican	Mark Gidley (incumbent)		
Write-in			
Total votes			100.00

== District 30 ==
=== Republican primary ===
==== Candidates ====
===== Nominee =====
- Craig Lipscomb, incumbent representative

==== Endorsements ====
Craig Lipscomb

Organizations

- Alabama Realtors PAC

=== General election ===
==== Results ====
2026 Alabama's 30th House of Representatives district election
Party	Candidate	Votes	%
Republican	Craig Lipscomb (incumbent)		
Write-in			
Total votes			100.00

== District 31 ==
=== Republican primary ===
==== Candidates ====
===== Nominee =====
- Troy Stubbs, incumbent representative

==== Endorsements ====
Troy Stubbs

Organizations

- Alabama Farmers Federation
- Alabama Realtors PAC
- Business Council of Alabama
- Manufacture Alabama

=== General election ===
==== Results ====
2026 Alabama's 31st House of Representatives district election
Party	Candidate	Votes	%
Republican	Troy Stubbs (incumbent)		
Write-in			
Total votes			100.00

== District 32 ==
=== Democratic primary ===
==== Candidates ====
===== Nominee =====
- Debra Foster, former Anniston city councilmember

===== Eliminated in primary =====
- David Reddick, former Anniston city councilmember

===== Declined =====
- Barbara Boyd, incumbent representative

==== Endorsements ====
Debra Foster

Organizations

- Alabama Realtors PAC

==== Results ====
Democratic primary
Party	Candidate	Votes	%
Democratic	Debra D Foster	2,851	67.61
Democratic	David E. Reddick	1,366	32.39
Total votes		4,217	100.00

=== Republican primary ===
==== Candidates ====
===== Nominee =====
- Joey Callahan

=== General election ===
==== Results ====
2026 Alabama's 32nd House of Representatives district election
Party	Candidate	Votes	%
Democratic	Debra Foster		
Republican	Joey Callahan		
Write-in			
Total votes			100.00

== District 33 ==
=== Republican primary ===
==== Candidates ====
===== Nominee =====
- Ben Robbins, incumbent representative

==== Endorsements ====
Ben Robbins

Organizations

- Alabama Realtors PAC
- Business Council of Alabama
- Manufacture Alabama

=== General election ===
==== Results ====
2026 Alabama's 33rd House of Representatives district election
Party	Candidate	Votes	%
Republican	Ben Robbins		
Write-in			
Total votes			100.00

== District 34 ==
=== Republican primary ===
==== Candidates ====
===== Nominee =====
- David Standridge, incumbent representative

==== Endorsements ====
David Standridge

Organizations

- Alabama Farmers Federation
- Alabama Realtors PAC
- Manufacture Alabama

=== General election ===
==== Results ====
2026 Alabama's 34th House of Representatives district election
Party	Candidate	Votes	%
Republican	David Standridge (incumbent)		
Write-in			
Total votes			100.00

== District 35 ==
=== Republican primary ===
==== Candidates ====
===== Nominee =====
- Steve Hurst, incumbent representative

==== Endorsements ====
Steve Hurst

Organizations

- Alabama Realtors PAC
- Business Council of Alabama
- Manufacture Alabama

=== Independent candidates ===
==== Declared ====
- Joseph Cleveland

=== General election ===
==== Results ====
2026 Alabama's 35th House of Representatives district election
Party	Candidate	Votes	%
Republican	Steve Hurst		
Independent	Joseph Cleveland		
Write-in			
Total votes			100.00

== District 36 ==
=== Republican primary ===
==== Candidates ====
===== Nominee =====
- Randy Wood, incumbent representative

==== Endorsements ====
Randy Wood

Organizations

- Alabama Realtors PAC
- Business Council of Alabama
- Manufacture Alabama

=== General election ===
==== Results ====
2026 Alabama's 37th House of Representatives district election
Party	Candidate	Votes	%
Republican	Randy Wood (incumbent)		
Write-in			
Total votes			100.00

== District 37 ==
=== Republican primary ===
==== Candidates ====
===== Advanced to runoff =====
- John Jacobs, educator
- Jeff Monroe, mayor of Five Points

===== Eliminated in primary =====
- Donna McKay, mayor of Wadley

===== Declined =====
- Bob Fincher, incumbent representative

==== Endorsements ====
Jeff Monroe

Organizations

- Alabama Farmers Federation

==== Results ====
Republican primary
Party	Candidate	Votes	%
Republican	Jeff Monroe	3,050	38.29
Republican	John Jacobs	2,766	34.73
Republican	Donna McKay	2,149	26.98
Total votes		7,965	100.00

==== Runoff ====
===== Results =====
Republican primary runoff
Party	Candidate	Votes	%
Republican	Jeff Monroe		
Republican	John Jacobs		
Total votes			100.00

=== Democratic primary ===
==== Candidates ====
===== Nominee =====
- Michelle French, co-chair of the Randolph County Democrats

=== General election ===
==== Results ====
2026 Alabama's 37th House of Representatives district election
Party	Candidate	Votes	%
Republican	John Jacobs		
Democratic	Michelle French		
Write-in			
Total votes			100.00

== District 38 ==
=== Republican primary ===
==== Candidates ====
===== Nominee =====
- Kristin Nelson, incumbent representative

==== Endorsements ====
Kristin Nelson

Organizations

- Alabama Realtors PAC
- Manufacture Alabama

=== Democratic primary ===
==== Candidates ====
===== Nominee =====
- Hazel Floyd, nominee for this district in the 2026 special election

===== Eliminated in primary =====
- Christopher Davis

==== Results ====
Democratic primary
Party	Candidate	Votes	%
Democratic	Hazel Floyd	1,522	73.85
Democratic	Christopher Davis	539	26.15
Total votes		2,061	100.00

=== General election ===
==== Results ====
2026 Alabama's 38th House of Representatives district election
Party	Candidate	Votes	%
Republican	Kristin Nelson (incumbent)		
Democratic	Hazel Floyd		
Write-in			
Total votes			100.00

== District 39 ==
=== Republican primary ===
==== Candidates ====
===== Nominee =====
- Ginny Shaver, incumbent representative

==== Endorsements ====
Ginny Shaver

Organizations

- Alabama Realtors PAC
- Business Council of Alabama
- Manufacture Alabama

=== General election ===
==== Results ====
2026 Alabama's 39th House of Representatives district election
Party	Candidate	Votes	%
Republican	Ginny Shaver (incumbent)		
Write-in			
Total votes			100.00

== District 40 ==
=== Republican primary ===
==== Candidates ====
===== Nominee =====
- Chad Robertson, incumbent representative

===== Eliminated in primary =====
- Kaycee Cavender, medical freedom activist
- Bill Lester, candidate for this seat in 2022
- Bill McAdams, candidate for this seat in 2022

==== Endorsements ====
Kaycee Cavender

Organizations

- National Association for Gun Rights
Chad Robertson

Organizations

- Alabama Realtors PAC
- Business Council of Alabama
- Manufacture Alabama
- National Rifle Association Political Victory Fund

==== Results ====
Republican primary
Party	Candidate	Votes	%
Republican	Chad Robertson (incumbent)	3,480	54.39
Republican	Kaycee Cavender	1,445	22.59
Republican	Bill McAdams	967	15.11
Republican	Bill Lester	506	7.91
Total votes		6,398	100.00

=== Democratic primary ===
==== Candidates ====
===== Nominee =====
- Pam Howard

=== General election ===
==== Results ====
2026 Alabama's 40th House of Representatives district election
Party	Candidate	Votes	%
Republican	Chad Robertson (incumbent)		
Democratic	Pam Howard		
Write-in			
Total votes			100.00

== District 41 ==
=== Republican primary ===
==== Candidates ====
===== Nominee =====
- Corley Ellis, incumbent representative

==== Endorsements ====
Corley Ellis

Organizations

- Alabama Farmers Federation
- Alabama Realtors PAC
- Business Council of Alabama
- Manufacture Alabama

=== Democratic primary ===
==== Candidates ====
===== Nominee =====
- David Morgan

=== General election ===
==== Results ====
2026 Alabama's 41st House of Representatives district election
Party	Candidate	Votes	%
Republican	Corley Ellis (incumbent)		
Democratic	David Morgan		
Write-in			
Total votes			100.00

== District 42 ==
=== Republican primary ===
==== Candidates ====
===== Nominee =====
- Ivan Smith, incumbent representative

==== Endorsements ====
Ivan Smith

Organizations

- Alabama Realtors PAC
- Business Council of Alabama
- Manufacture Alabama

=== General election ===
==== Results ====
2026 Alabama's 42nd House of Representatives district election
Party	Candidate	Votes	%
Republican	Ivan Smith (incumbent)		
Write-in			
Total votes			100.00

== District 43 ==
=== Republican primary ===
==== Candidates ====
===== Nominee =====
- Arnold Mooney, incumbent representative

==== Endorsements ====
Arnold Mooney

Organizations

- Alabama Realtors PAC
- Manufacture Alabama
- National Association for Gun Rights

=== Democratic primary ===
==== Candidates ====
===== Nominee =====
- Taylor Cook

=== General election ===
==== Results ====
2026 Alabama's 43rd House of Representatives district election
Party	Candidate	Votes	%
Republican	Arnold Mooney (incumbent)		
Democratic	Taylor Cook		
Write-in			
Total votes			100.00

== District 44 ==
=== Republican primary ===
==== Candidates ====
===== Nominee =====
- Danny Garrett, incumbent representative

==== Endorsements ====
Danny Garrett

Organizations

- Alabama Realtors PAC
- Business Council of Alabama
- Manufacture Alabama

=== General election ===
==== Results ====
2026 Alabama's 44th House of Representatives district election
Party	Candidate	Votes	%
Republican	Danny Garrett (incumbent)		
Write-in			
Total votes			100.00

== District 45 ==
=== Republican primary ===
==== Candidates ====
===== Nominee =====
- Susan DuBose, incumbent representative

===== Eliminated in primary =====
- John Dawson

==== Endorsements ====
Susan DuBose

Organizations

- Alabama Realtors PAC
- Business Council of Alabama
- Manufacture Alabama
- National Rifle Association Political Victory Fund

==== Results ====
Republican primary
Party	Candidate	Votes	%
Republican	Susan DuBose (incumbent)	4,169	80.65
Republican	John Dawson	1,000	19.35
Total votes		5,169	100.00

=== Democratic primary ===
==== Candidates ====
===== Nominee =====
- Toni Kornegay Vaughn, retired insurance executive

=== General election ===
==== Results ====
2026 Alabama's 45th House of Representatives district election
Party	Candidate	Votes	%
Republican	Susan DuBose (incumbent)		
Democratic	Tony Kornegay Vaughn		
Write-in			
Total votes			100.00

== District 46 ==
=== Republican primary ===
==== Candidates ====
===== Nominee =====
- David Faulkner, incumbent representative

==== Endorsements ====
David Faulkner

Organizations

- Alabama Realtors PAC
- Business Council of Alabama
- Manufacture Alabama

=== General election ===
==== Results ====
2026 Alabama's 46th House of Representatives district election
Party	Candidate	Votes	%
Republican	David Faulkner (incumbent)		
Write-in			
Total votes			100.00

== District 47 ==
=== Republican primary ===
==== Candidates ====
===== Nominee =====
- Mike Shaw, incumbent representative

==== Endorsements ====
Mike Shaw

Organizations

- Alabama Realtors PAC
- Business Council of Alabama
- Manufacture Alabama

=== Democratic primary ===
==== Candidates ====
===== Nominee =====
- Jim Toomey

=== General election ===
==== Results ====
2026 Alabama's 47th House of Representatives district election
Party	Candidate	Votes	%
Republican	Mike Shaw (incumbent)		
Democratic	Jim Toomey		
Write-in			
Total votes			100.00

== District 48 ==
=== Republican primary ===
==== Candidates ====
===== Nominee =====
- Lloyd Peeples, assistant U.S. Attorney for the Northern District of Alabama

===== Eliminated in primary =====
- Jim Carns, incumbent representative
- William Wentowski, candidate for this seat in 2018 and 2022

==== Endorsements ====
Jim Carns

Organizations

- Alabama Farmers Federation
- Alabama Realtors PAC
- Business Council of Alabama
- Manufacture Alabama
- National Rifle Association Political Victory Fund
Lloyd Peeples

Organizations

- Americans for Prosperity

==== Polling ====
Poll source	Date(s) administered	Sample size (Note: Key: A – all adults RV – registered voters LV – likely voters V – unclear)	Margin of error	Jim Carns	Lloyd Peeples	Undecided
Cygnal (R)	January 29–31, 2026	300 (LV)	–	23%	16%	59%

==== Results ====
Republican primary
Party	Candidate	Votes	%
Republican	Lloyd Peeples	3,365	55.84
Republican	Jim Carns (incumbent)	2,282	37.87
Republican	William Wentowski	379	6.29
Total votes		6,026	100.00

=== General election ===
==== Results ====
2026 Alabama's 48th House of Representatives district election
Party	Candidate	Votes	%
Republican	Lloyd Peeples		
Write-in			
Total votes			100.00

== District 49 ==
=== Republican primary ===
==== Candidates ====
===== Nominee =====
- Russell Bedsole, incumbent representative

==== Endorsements ====
Russell Bedsole

Organizations

- Alabama Realtors PAC
- Business Council of Alabama
- Manufacture Alabama

=== General election ===
==== Results ====
2026 Alabama's 49th House of Representatives district election
Party	Candidate	Votes	%
Republican	Russell Bedsole (incumbent)		
Write-in			
Total votes			100.00

== District 50 ==
=== Republican primary ===
==== Candidates ====
===== Nominee =====
- Bill Morris, former mayor of Moody (1992–2003)

===== Eliminated in primary =====
- Bryan Newell, veteran

===== Declined =====
- Jim Hill, incumbent representative

==== Endorsements ====
Bill Morris

Organizations

- Alabama Realtors PAC

==== Results ====
Republican primary
Party	Candidate	Votes	%
Republican	Bill Morris	3,413	69.74
Republican	Bryan K. Newell	1,481	30.26
Total votes		4,894	100.00

=== Democratic primary ===
==== Candidates ====
===== Nominee =====
- Alan Thomas

=== General election ===
==== Results ====
2026 Alabama's 50th House of Representatives district election
Party	Candidate	Votes	%
Republican	Bill Morris		
Democratic	Alan Thomas		
Write-in			
Total votes			100.00

== District 51 ==
=== Republican primary ===
==== Candidates ====
===== Nominee =====
- Allen Treadaway, incumbent representative

==== Endorsements ====
Allen Treadaway

Organizations

- Alabama Realtors PAC
- Business Council of Alabama
- Manufacture Alabama

=== General election ===
==== Results ====
2026 Alabama's 51st House of Representatives district election
Party	Candidate	Votes	%
Republican	Allen Treadaway (incumbent)		
Write-in			
Total votes			100.00

== District 52 ==
=== Democratic primary ===
==== Candidates ====
===== Advanced to runoff =====
- GiGi Hayes
- LaTanya Millhouse

===== Eliminated in primary =====
- Kelvin Datcher, incumbent representative

==== Endorsements ====
Kelvin Datcher

Organizations

- Alabama Realtors PAC
- Manufacture Alabama

==== Results ====
Democratic primary
Party	Candidate	Votes	%
Democratic	GiGi Hayes	3,880	48.87
Democratic	LaTanya Millhouse	2,096	26.40
Democratic	Kelvin Datcher (incumbent)	1,964	24.74
Total votes		7,940	100.00

==== Runoff ====
===== Results =====
Democratic primary runoff
Party	Candidate	Votes	%
Democratic	GiGi Hayes		
Democratic	LaTanya Millhouse		
Total votes			100.00

=== General election ===
==== Results ====
2026 Alabama's 52nd House of Representatives district election
Party	Candidate	Votes	%
Democratic	GiGi Hayes		
Write-in			
Total votes			100.00

== District 53 ==
=== Democratic primary ===
==== Candidates ====
===== Nominee =====
- Anthony Daniels, incumbent representative

==== Endorsements ====
Anthony Daniels

Organizations

- Alabama Realtors PAC
- Business Council of Alabama
- Manufacture Alabama

=== General election ===
==== Results ====
2026 Alabama's 53rd House of Representatives district election
Party	Candidate	Votes	%
Democratic	Anthony Daniels (incumbent)		
Write-in			
Total votes			100.00

== District 54 ==
=== Democratic primary ===
==== Candidates ====
===== Nominee =====
- Neil Rafferty, incumbent representative

===== Eliminated in primary =====
- Joseph Holt

==== Endorsements ====
Neil Rafferty

Organizations

- Alabama Realtors PAC
- Business Council of Alabama

==== Results ====
Democratic primary
Party	Candidate	Votes	%
Democratic	Neil Rafferty (incumbent)	5,052	70.04
Democratic	Joseph Holt	2,161	29.96
Total votes		7,213	100.00

=== General election ===
==== Results ====
2026 Alabama's 54th House of Representatives district election
Party	Candidate	Votes	%
Democratic	Neil Rafferty (incumbent)		
Write-in			
Total votes			100.00

== District 55 ==
=== Democratic primary ===
==== Candidates ====
===== Nominee =====
- Travis Hendrix, incumbent representative

===== Eliminated in primary =====
- Jennifer Craig
- Eric Major, former state representative from the 55th district (1999–2007)

==== Endorsements ====
Travis Hendrix

Organizations

- Alabama Realtors PAC
- Business Council of Alabama

==== Results ====
Democratic primary
Party	Candidate	Votes	%
Democratic	Travis Hendrix (incumbent)	4,366	56.84
Democratic	Jennifer "Jenny" Craig	1,706	22.21
Democratic	Eric Major	1,609	20.95
Total votes		7,681	100.00

=== Independents ===
==== Did not qualify ====
- Keith O. Williams, nonprofit leader and candidate for the Birmingham City Council in 2025

=== General election ===
==== Results ====
2026 Alabama's 55th House of Representatives district election
Party	Candidate	Votes	%
Democratic	Travis Hendrix (incumbent)		
Write-in			
Total votes			100.00

== District 56 ==
=== Democratic primary ===
==== Candidates ====
===== Nominee =====
- Ontario Tillman, incumbent representative

==== Endorsements ====
Ontario Tillman

Organizations

- Alabama Realtors PAC
- Business Council of Alabama

=== General election ===
==== Results ====
2026 Alabama's 56th House of Representatives district election
Party	Candidate	Votes	%
Democratic	Ontario Tillman (incumbent)		
Write-in			
Total votes			100.00

== District 57 ==
=== Democratic primary ===
==== Candidates ====
===== Nominee =====
- Patrick Sellers, incumbent representative

===== Eliminated in primary =====
- Shamyia Atkins, law school student
- Mara Ruffin Blackmon

==== Endorsements ====
Patrick Sellers

Organizations

- Alabama Realtors PAC
- Business Council of Alabama
- Manufacture Alabama

==== Results ====
Democratic primary
Party	Candidate	Votes	%
Democratic	Patrick Sellers (incumbent)	5,454	61.14
Democratic	Mara Ruffin Blackmon	2,925	32.79
Democratic	Shamyia Atkins	541	6.07
Total votes		8,920	100.00

=== General election ===
==== Results ====
2026 Alabama's 57th House of Representatives district election
Party	Candidate	Votes	%
Democratic	Patrick Sellers		
Write-in			
Total votes			100.00

== District 58 ==
=== Democratic primary ===
==== Candidates ====
===== Nominee =====
- Rolanda Hollis, incumbent representative

==== Endorsements ====
Rolanda Hollis

Organizations

- Alabama Realtors PAC
- Business Council of Alabama
- Manufacture Alabama

=== General election ===
==== Results ====
2026 Alabama's 58th House of Representatives district election
Party	Candidate	Votes	%
Democratic	Rolanda Hollis (incumbent)		
Write-in			
Total votes			100.00

== District 59 ==
=== Democratic primary ===
==== Candidates ====
===== Nominee =====
- Mary Moore, incumbent representative

==== Endorsements ====
Mary Moore

Organizations

- Alabama Realtors PAC

=== General election ===
==== Results ====
2026 Alabama's 59th House of Representatives district election
Party	Candidate	Votes	%
Democratic	Mary Moore (incumbent)		
Write-in			
Total votes			100.00

== District 60 ==
=== Democratic primary ===
==== Candidates ====
===== Nominee =====
- Alicia Escott Lumpkin, former Birmingham director of process improvement

===== Eliminated in primary =====
- Juandalynn Givan, incumbent representative
- Nina Taylor, candidate in 2022

==== Endorsements ====
Juandalynn Givan

Organizations

- Alabama Realtors PAC
Alicia Escott Lumpkin

State representatives

- Curtis Travis, state representative from the 72nd district (2022–present)

County officials

- Sheila Tyson, Jefferson County commissioner from the 2nd district (2018–present)

Local officials

- Randall Woodfin, 34th mayor of Birmingham (2017–present)

Organizations

- Alabama College Democrats
- Alabama Young Democrats
- Business Council of Alabama
- Jefferson County Farmers Federation

==== Results ====
Democratic primary
Party	Candidate	Votes	%
Democratic	Alicia Escott Lumpkin	5,080	52.26
Democratic	Juandalynn Givan (incumbent)	3,261	33.55
Democratic	Nina Taylor	1,379	14.19
Total votes		9,720	100.00

=== General election ===
==== Results ====
2026 Alabama's 60th House of Representatives district election
Party	Candidate	Votes	%
Democratic	Alicia Escott Lumpkin		
Write-in			
Total votes			100.00

== District 61 ==
=== Republican primary ===
==== Candidates ====
===== Nominee =====
- Ron Bolton, incumbent representative

==== Endorsements ====
Ron Bolton

Organizations

- Alabama Realtors PAC
- Business Council of Alabama
- Manufacture Alabama

=== General election ===
==== Results ====
2026 Alabama's 61st House of Representatives district election
Party	Candidate	Votes	%
Republican	Ron Bolton (incumbent)		
Write-in			
Total votes			100.00

== District 62 ==
=== Republican primary ===
==== Candidates ====
===== Nominee =====
- Bill Lamb, incumbent representative

==== Endorsements ====
Bill Lamb

Organizations

- Alabama Realtors PAC
- Business Council of Alabama
- Manufacture Alabama

=== General election ===
==== Results ====
2026 Alabama's 62nd House of Representatives district election
Party	Candidate	Votes	%
Republican	Bill Lamb (incumbent)		
Write-in			
Total votes			100.00

== District 63 ==
=== Republican primary ===
==== Candidates ====
===== Nominee =====
- Norman Crow, incumbent representative

==== Endorsements ====
Norman Crow

Organizations

- Alabama Realtors PAC

=== Democratic primary ===
==== Candidates ====
===== Nominee =====
- Judith Taylor, chair of the Tuscaloosa County Democratic Party and nominee for this district in the 2026 special election

=== General election ===
==== Results ====
2026 Alabama's 63rd House of Representatives district election
Party	Candidate	Votes	%
Republican	Norman Crow (incumbent)		
Democratic	Judith Taylor		
Write-in			
Total votes			100.00

== District 64 ==
=== Republican primary ===
==== Candidates ====
===== Nominee =====
- Donna Givens, incumbent representative

==== Endorsements ====
Donna Givens

Organizations

- Alabama Farmers Federation
- Alabama Realtors PAC
- Business Council of Alabama
- Manufacture Alabama

=== General election ===
==== Results ====
2026 Alabama's 64th House of Representatives district election
Party	Candidate	Votes	%
Republican	Donna Givens (incumbent)		
Write-in			
Total votes			100.00

== District 65 ==
=== Republican primary ===
==== Candidates ====
===== Nominee =====
- John Knapp, law enforcement officer

===== Eliminated in primary =====
- Dee Ann Campbell, candidate for this seat in 2022

===== Disqualified =====
- Jessica Ross, director of the Washington County Public Library

===== Declined =====
- Brett Easterbrook, incumbent representative (ran for state senate)

==== Endorsements ====
Jessica Ross (disqualified)

Organizations

- Business Council of Alabama
- Manufacture Alabama

==== Results ====
Republican primary
Party	Candidate	Votes	%
Republican	John Knapp	4,270	57.80
Republican	Dee Ann Campbell	3,118	42.20
Total votes		7,388	100.00

=== Independent candidates ===
==== Declared ====
- Elaine Beech, former Democratic representative for this district (2009–2019)

=== General election ===
==== Results ====
2026 Alabama's 65th House of Representatives district election
Party	Candidate	Votes	%
Republican	John Knapp		
Independent	Elaine Beech		
Write-in			
Total votes			100.00

== District 66 ==
=== Republican primary ===
==== Candidates ====
===== Nominee =====
- Alan Baker, incumbent representative

==== Endorsements ====
Alan Baker

Organizations

- Alabama Realtors PAC
- Business Council of Alabama
- Manufacture Alabama

=== General election ===
==== Results ====
2026 Alabama's 66th House of Representatives district election
Party	Candidate	Votes	%
Republican	Alan Baker (incumbent)		
Write-in			
Total votes			100.00

== District 67 ==
=== Democratic primary ===
==== Candidates ====
===== Nominee =====
- Prince Chestnut, incumbent representative

==== Endorsements ====
Prince Chestnut

Organizations

- Alabama Realtors PAC
- Business Council of Alabama
- Manufacture Alabama

=== General election ===
==== Results ====
2026 Alabama's 67th House of Representatives district election
Party	Candidate	Votes	%
Democratic	Prince Chestnut (incumbent)		
Write-in			
Total votes			100.00

== District 68 ==
=== Democratic primary ===
==== Candidates ====
===== Nominee =====
- Thomas Jackson, incumbent representative

==== Endorsements ====
Thomas Jackson

Organizations

- Alabama Realtors PAC
- Business Council of Alabama

=== Republican primary ===
==== Candidates ====
===== Nominee =====
- Fred Kelley, nominee for this district in 2022

=== General election ===
==== Results ====
2026 Alabama's 68th House of Representatives district election
Party	Candidate	Votes	%
Democratic	Thomas Jackson (incumbent)		
Republican	Fred Kelley		
Write-in			
Total votes			100.00

== District 69 ==
=== Democratic primary ===
==== Candidates ====
===== Nominee =====
- Kelvin Lawrence, incumbent representative

===== Eliminated in primary =====
- Marshae Madison, educator

==== Endorsements ====
Kelvin Lawrence

Organizations

- Alabama Realtors PAC
- Business Council of Alabama
- Manufacture Alabama

==== Results ====
Democratic primary
Party	Candidate	Votes	%
Democratic	Kelvin Lawrence (incumbent)	5,291	66.00
Democratic	Marshae Madison	2,726	34.00
Total votes		8,017	100.00

=== Republican primary ===
==== Candidates ====
===== Nominee =====
- Josh Pendergrass, former communications director for Governor Kay Ivey (previously ran for state auditor)

=== General election ===
==== Results ====
2026 Alabama's 69th House of Representatives district election
Party	Candidate	Votes	%
Democratic	Kelvin Lawrence (incumbent)		
Republican	Josh Pendergrass		
Write-in			
Total votes			100.00

== District 70 ==
=== Democratic primary ===
==== Candidates ====
===== Nominee =====
- Christopher J. England, incumbent representative

==== Endorsements ====
Christopher England

Organizations

- Alabama Realtors PAC
- Business Council of Alabama
- Manufacture Alabama

=== Republican primary ===
==== Candidates ====
===== Nominee =====
- Ian Chwatuk

=== General election ===
==== Results ====
2026 Alabama's 70th House of Representatives district election
Party	Candidate	Votes	%
Democratic	Christopher J. England (incumbent)		
Republican	Ian Chwatuk		
Write-in			
Total votes			100.00

== District 71 ==
=== Democratic primary ===
==== Candidates ====
===== Nominee =====
- Artis J. McCampbell, incumbent representative

==== Endorsements ====
Artis J. McCampbell

Organizations

- Alabama Realtors PAC
- Business Council of Alabama
- Manufacture Alabama

=== General election ===
==== Results ====
2026 Alabama's 71st House of Representatives district election
Party	Candidate	Votes	%
Democratic	Artis J. McCampbell (incumbent)		
Write-in			
Total votes			100.00

== District 72 ==
=== Democratic primary ===
==== Candidates ====
===== Nominee =====
- Curtis Travis, incumbent representative

===== Eliminated in primary =====
- Michael Williams

==== Endorsements ====
Curtis Travis

Organizations

- Alabama Realtors PAC
- Business Council of Alabama
- Manufacture Alabama

==== Results ====
Democratic primary
Party	Candidate	Votes	%
Democratic	Curtis L Travis (incumbent)	6,163	76.63
Democratic	Michael Williams	1,880	23.37
Total votes		8,043	100.00

=== General election ===
==== Results ====
2026 Alabama's 72nd House of Representatives district election
Party	Candidate	Votes	%
Democratic	Curtis Travis (incumbent)		
Write-in			
Total votes			100.00

== District 73 ==
=== Republican primary ===
==== Candidates ====
===== Nominee =====
- Kenneth Paschal, incumbent representative

==== Endorsements ====
Kenneth Paschal

Organizations

- Alabama Realtors PAC
- Business Council of Alabama
- Manufacture Alabama

=== General election ===
==== Results ====
2026 Alabama's 73rd House of Representatives district election
Party	Candidate	Votes	%
Republican	Kenneth Paschal (incumbent)		
Write-in			
Total votes			100.00

== District 74 ==
=== Democratic primary ===
==== Candidates ====
===== Nominee =====
- Jasmyne Crimiel, prosecutor

===== Eliminated in primary =====
- Austin Smith

===== Declined =====
- Phillip Ensler, incumbent representative

==== Endorsements ====
Jasmyne Crimiel

Local officials

- Steven Reed, mayor of Montgomery (2019–present)
Autin Smith

Organizations

- Alabama Realtors PAC

==== Results ====
Democratic primary
Party	Candidate	Votes	%
Democratic	Jasmyne Crimiel	4,044	54.77
Democratic	Austin Smith	3,340	45.23
Total votes		7,834	100.00

=== Republican primary ===
==== Candidates ====
===== Nominee =====
- Alva Lambert

=== General election ===
==== Results ====
2026 Alabama's 74th House of Representatives district election
Party	Candidate	Votes	%
Democratic	Jasmyne Crimiel		
Republican	Alva Lambert		
Write-in			
Total votes			100.00

== District 75 ==
=== Republican primary ===
==== Candidates ====
===== Nominee =====
- Reed Ingram, incumbent representative

==== Endorsements ====
Reed Ingram

Organizations

- Alabama Farmers Federation
- Alabama Realtors PAC
- Business Council of Alabama
- Manufacture Alabama

=== Democratic primary ===
==== Candidates ====
===== Nominee =====
- Tisha Nickson

=== General election ===
==== Results ====
2026 Alabama's 75th House of Representatives district election
Party	Candidate	Votes	%
Republican	Reed Ingram (incumbent)		
Democratic	Tisha Nickson		
Write-in			
Total votes			100.00

== District 76 ==
=== Democratic primary ===
==== Candidates ====
===== Nominee =====
- Patrice McClammy, incumbent representative

===== Eliminated in primary =====
- Terance Dawson

==== Endorsements ====
Patrice McClammy

Organizations

- Alabama Realtors PAC

==== Results ====
Democratic primary
Party	Candidate	Votes	%
Democratic	Patrice "Penni" McClammey (incumbent)	6,583	78.48
Democratic	Terrence "Watchdog" Johnson	1,805	21.52
Total votes		8,388	100.00

=== General election ===
==== Results ====
2026 Alabama's 76th House of Representatives district election
Party	Candidate	Votes	%
Democratic	Patrice McClammy (incumbent)		
Write-in			
Total votes			100.00

== District 77 ==
=== Democratic primary ===
==== Candidates ====
===== Nominee =====
- Tashina Morris, incumbent representative

==== Endorsements ====
Tashina Morris

Organizations

- Alabama Realtors PAC
- Business Council of Alabama

=== General election ===
==== Results ====
2026 Alabama's 77th House of Representatives district election
Party	Candidate	Votes	%
Democratic	Tashina Morris (incumbent)		
Write-in			
Total votes			100.00

== District 78 ==
=== Democratic primary ===
==== Candidates ====
===== Nominee =====
- Kenyatté Hassell, incumbent representative

==== Endorsements ====
Kenyatte Hassell

Organizations

- Alabama Realtors PAC
- Business Council of Alabama
- Manufacture Alabama

=== General election ===
==== Results ====
2026 Alabama's 78th House of Representatives district election
Party	Candidate	Votes	%
Democratic	Kenyatté Hassell (incumbent)		
Write-in			
Total votes			100.00

== District 79 ==
=== Republican primary ===
==== Candidates ====
===== Nominee =====
- Joe Lovvorn, incumbent representative

==== Endorsements ====
Joe Lovvorn

Organizations

- Alabama Realtors PAC
- Business Council of Alabama
- Manufacture Alabama

=== General election ===
==== Results ====
2026 Alabama's 79th House of Representatives district election
Party	Candidate	Votes	%
Republican	Joe Lovvorn (incumbent)		
Write-in			
Total votes			100.00

== District 80 ==
=== Republican primary ===
==== Candidates ====
===== Nominee =====
- Chris Blackshear, incumbent representative

==== Endorsements ====
Chris Blackshear

Organizations

- Alabama Realtors PAC
- Business Council of Alabama
- Manufacture Alabama

=== Democratic primary ===
==== Candidates ====
===== Nominee =====
- Manfred Malone

=== General election ===
==== Results ====
2026 Alabama's 80th House of Representatives district election
Party	Candidate	Votes	%
Republican	Chris Blackshear (incumbent)		
Democratic	Manfred Malone		
Write-in			
Total votes			100.00

== District 81 ==
=== Republican primary ===
==== Candidates ====
===== Nominee =====
- Ed Oliver, incumbent representative

==== Endorsements ====
Ed Oliver

Organizations

- Alabama Realtors PAC
- Business Council of Alabama
- Manufacture Alabama

=== General election ===
==== Results ====
2026 Alabama's 81st House of Representatives district election
Party	Candidate	Votes	%
Republican	Ed Oliver (incumbent)		
Write-in			
Total votes			100.00

== District 82 ==
=== Democratic primary ===
==== Candidates ====
===== Advanced to runoff =====
- Sidney Brown
- Pebblin Warren, incumbent representative

===== Eliminated in primary =====
- Terrence Johnson
- Jamie Lowe, chair of the Lee County Democratic Party

==== Endorsements ====
Pebblin Warren

Organizations

- Alabama Realtors PAC
- Business Council of Alabama
- Manufacture Alabama

==== Results ====
Democratic primary
Party	Candidate	Votes	%
Democratic	Pebblin Warren (incumbent)	2,784	48.16
Democratic	Sidney "Doc" Brown	1,336	23.11
Democratic	Terrence K. Johnson	1,125	19.46
Democratic	Jamie Lowe	536	9.27
Total votes		5,781	100.00

==== Runoff ====
===== Results =====
Democratic primary runoff
Party	Candidate	Votes	%
Democratic	Pebblin Warren (incumbent)		
Democratic	Sidney "Doc" Brown		
Total votes			100.00

=== Republican primary ===
==== Candidates ====
===== Nominee =====
- Kinsley Hammons

=== General election ===
==== Results ====
2026 Alabama's 82nd House of Representatives district election
Party	Candidate	Votes	%
Democratic	Pebblin Warren (incumbent)		
Republican	Kinsley Hammons		
Write-in			
Total votes			100.00

== District 83 ==
=== Democratic primary ===
==== Candidates ====
===== Nominee =====
- Jeremy Gray, incumbent representative

==== Endorsements ====
Jeremy Gray

Organizations

- Alabama Realtors PAC
- Business Council of Alabama
- Manufacture Alabama

=== General election ===
==== Results ====
2026 Alabama's 83rd House of Representatives district election
Party	Candidate	Votes	%
Democratic	Jeremy Gray (incumbent)		
Write-in			
Total votes			100.00

== District 84 ==
=== Democratic primary ===
==== Candidates ====
===== Nominee =====
- Berry Forte, incumbent representative

===== Eliminated in primary =====
- Brittani O'Hara-Grant

==== Endorsements ====
Berry Forte

Organizations

- Alabama Realtors PAC

==== Results ====
Democratic primary
Party	Candidate	Votes	%
Democratic	Berry Forte (incumbent)	3,449	58.44
Democratic	Brittani O'Hara-Grant	2,453	41.56
Total votes		5,902	100.00

=== General election ===
==== Results ====
2026 Alabama's 84th House of Representatives district election
Party	Candidate	Votes	%
Democratic	Berry Forte (incumbent)		
Write-in			
Total votes			100.00

== District 85 ==
=== Republican primary ===
==== Candidates ====
===== Nominee =====
- Rick Rehm, incumbent representative

===== Eliminated in primary =====
- David Money, probate judge and former chair of the Henry County Commission

==== Endorsements ====
David Money

Organizations

- Business Council of Alabama
Rick Rehm

Organizations

- Alabama Forestry Association
- Alabama Realtors PAC
- National Rifle Association Political Victory Fund

==== Results ====
Republican primary
Party	Candidate	Votes	%
Republican	Rick Rehm (incumbent)	2,528	55.61
Republican	David Money	2,018	44.39
Total votes		4,546	100.00

=== Democratic primary ===
==== Candidates ====
===== Nominee =====
- Aristotle Kirkland

=== General election ===
==== Results ====
2026 Alabama's 85th House of Representatives district election
Party	Candidate	Votes	%
Republican	Rick Rehm (incumbent)		
Democratic	Aristotle Kirkland		
Write-in			
Total votes			100.00

== District 86 ==
=== Republican primary ===
==== Candidates ====
===== Nominee =====
- Paul Lee, incumbent representative

==== Endorsements ====
Paul Lee

Organizations

- Alabama Realtors PAC
- Business Council of Alabama
- Manufacture Alabama

=== General election ===
==== Results ====
2026 Alabama's 86th House of Representatives district election
Party	Candidate	Votes	%
Republican	Paul Lee (incumbent)		
Write-in			
Total votes			100.00

== District 87 ==
=== Republican primary ===
==== Candidates ====
===== Nominee =====
- Jeff Sorrells, incumbent representative

==== Endorsements ====
Jeff Sorrells

Organizations

- Alabama Realtors PAC
- Business Council of Alabama
- Manufacture Alabama

=== General election ===
==== Results ====
2026 Alabama's 87th House of Representatives district election
Party	Candidate	Votes	%
Republican	Jeff Sorrells (incumbent)		
Write-in			
Total votes			100.00

== District 88 ==
=== Republican primary ===
==== Candidates ====
===== Nominee =====
- Jerry Starnes, incumbent representative

==== Endorsements ====
Jerry Starnes

Organizations

- Alabama Realtors PAC
- Business Council of Alabama
- Manufacture Alabama

=== General election ===
==== Results ====
2026 Alabama's 88th House of Representatives district election
Party	Candidate	Votes	%
Republican	Jerry Starnes (incumbent)		
Write-in			
Total votes			100.00

== District 89 ==
=== Republican primary ===
==== Candidates ====
===== Nominee =====
- Marcus Paramore, incumbent representative

==== Endorsements ====
Marcus Paramore

Organizations

- Alabama Realtors PAC
- Business Council of Alabama
- Manufacture Alabama

=== General election ===
==== Results ====
2026 Alabama's 89th House of Representatives district election
Party	Candidate	Votes	%
Republican	Marcus Paramore (incumbent)		
Write-in			
Total votes			100.00

== District 90 ==
=== Republican primary ===
==== Candidates ====
===== Nominee =====
- Chris Sells, incumbent representative

==== Endorsements ====
Chris Sells

Organizations

- Alabama Realtors PAC
- Manufacture Alabama

=== General election ===
==== Results ====
2026 Alabama's 90th House of Representatives district election
Party	Candidate	Votes	%
Republican	Chris Sells (incumbent)		
Write-in			
Total votes			100.00

== District 91 ==
=== Republican primary ===
==== Candidates ====
===== Nominee =====
- Jody Linton, small business owner

===== Eliminated in primary =====
- Rod Morgan, small business owner and county administrator

===== Declined =====
- Rhett Marques, incumbent representative (running for U.S. House)

==== Endorsements ====
Jody Linton

Organizations

- Business Council of Alabama

==== Results ====
Republican primary
Party	Candidate	Votes	%
Republican	Jody Linton	3,262	62.15
Republican	Rod Morgan	1,987	37.85
Total votes		5,249	100.00

=== General election ===
==== Results ====
2026 Alabama's 91st House of Representatives district election
Party	Candidate	Votes	%
Republican	Jody Linton		
Write-in			
Total votes			100.00

== District 92 ==
=== Republican primary ===
==== Candidates ====
===== Nominee =====
- Matthew Hammett, incumbent representative

==== Endorsements ====
Matthew Hammett

Organizations

- Alabama Realtors PAC
- Business Council of Alabama
- Manufacture Alabama

=== General election ===
==== Results ====
2026 Alabama's 92nd House of Representatives district election
Party	Candidate	Votes	%
Republican	Matthew Hammett (incumbent)		
Write-in			
Total votes			100.00

== District 93 ==
=== Republican primary ===
==== Candidates ====
===== Nominee =====
- Steve Clouse, incumbent representative

===== Eliminated in primary =====
- Norman Horton, candidate for state senate in 2022

==== Endorsements ====
Steve Clouse

Organizations

- Alabama Realtors PAC
- Business Council of Alabama
- Manufacture Alabama
- National Rifle Association Political Victory Fund

==== Results ====
Republican primary
Party	Candidate	Votes	%
Republican	Steve Clouse (incumbent)	3,394	72.41
Republican	Norman Horton	1,293	27.59
Total votes		4,687	100.00

=== General election ===
==== Results ====
2026 Alabama's 93rd House of Representatives district election
Party	Candidate	Votes	%
Republican	Steve Clouse (incumbent)		
Write-in			
Total votes			100.00

== District 94 ==
=== Republican primary ===
==== Candidates ====
===== Nominee =====
- Jennifer Fidler, incumbent representative

==== Endorsements ====
Jennifer Fidler

Organizations

- Alabama Realtors PAC
- Business Council of Alabama
- Manufacture Alabama

=== General election ===
==== Results ====
2026 Alabama's 94th House of Representatives district election
Party	Candidate	Votes	%
Republican	Jennifer Fidler (incumbent)		
Write-in			
Total votes			100.00

== District 95 ==
=== Republican primary ===
==== Candidates ====
===== Advanced to runoff =====
- Joe Freeman, business owner
- Frances Holk-Jones, incumbent representative

===== Eliminated in primary =====
- Elijah Davison, political science graduate

==== Endorsements ====
Joe Freeman

Local officials

- Tony Kennon, mayor of Orange Beach

Organizations

- Alabama Farmers Federation
Frances Holk-Jones

Organizations

- Alabama Realtors PAC
- Business Council of Alabama
- Manufacture Alabama
- National Rifle Association Political Victory Fund

==== Results ====
Republican primary
Party	Candidate	Votes	%
Republican	Frances Holk-Jones (incumbent)	3,225	42.41
Republican	Joe Freeman	2,933	38.57
Republican	Elijah Davison	1,446	19.02
Total votes		7,604	100.00

==== Runoff ====
===== Results =====
Republican primary runoff
Party	Candidate	Votes	%
Republican	Frances Holk-Jones (incumbent)		
Republican	Joe Freeman		
Total votes			100.00

=== General election ===
==== Results ====
2026 Alabama's 95th House of Representatives district election
Party	Candidate	Votes	%
Republican	Frances Holk-Jones (incumbent)		
Write-in			
Total votes			100.00

== District 96 ==
=== Republican primary ===
==== Candidates ====
===== Nominee =====
- Danielle Duggar, resident

===== Eliminated in primary =====
- Matt Simpson, incumbent representative

==== Endorsements ====
Danielle Duggar

Organizations

- Alabama Farmers Federation
- National Association for Gun Rights
Matt Simpson

Organizations

- Alabama Realtors PAC
- Americans for Prosperity
- Business Council of Alabama
- Manufacture Alabama
- National Rifle Association Political Victory Fund

==== Results ====
Republican primary
Party	Candidate	Votes	%
Republican	Danielle Duggar	2,951	51.37
Republican	Matt Simpson (incumbent)	2,794	48.63
Total votes		5,745	100.00

=== Democratic primary ===
==== Candidates ====
===== Nominee =====
- Terri Osborne

=== General election ===
==== Results ====
2026 Alabama's 96th House of Representatives district election
Party	Candidate	Votes	%
Republican	Danielle Duggar		
Democratic	Terri Osborne		
Write-in			
Total votes			100.00

== District 97 ==
=== Democratic primary ===
==== Candidates ====
===== Nominee =====
- Adline Clarke, incumbent representative

===== Eliminated in primary =====
- Shalela Dowdy

==== Endorsements ====
Adline Clark

Organizations

- Alabama Realtors PAC
- Business Council of Alabama

==== Results ====
Democratic primary
Party	Candidate	Votes	%
Democratic	Adline C. Clarke (incumbent)	3,384	61.91
Democratic	Shalela Dowdy	2,082	38.09
Total votes		5,466	100.00

=== General election ===
==== Results ====
2026 Alabama's 97th House of Representatives district election
Party	Candidate	Votes	%
Democratic	Adline Clarke (incumbent)		
Write-in			
Total votes			100.00

== District 98 ==
=== Democratic primary ===
==== Candidates ====
===== Nominee =====
- Napoleon Bracy Jr., incumbent representative

==== Endorsements ====
Napoleon Bracy Jr.

Organizations

- Alabama Realtors PAC
- Business Council of Alabama
- Manufacture Alabama

=== General election ===
==== Results ====
2026 Alabama's 98th House of Representatives district election
Party	Candidate	Votes	%
Democratic	Napoleon Bracy Jr. (incumbent)		
Write-in			
Total votes			100.00

== District 99 ==
=== Democratic primary ===
==== Candidates ====
===== Nominee =====
- Sam Jones, incumbent representative

===== Eliminated in primary =====
- Jyl Hughes
- Levi Wright Jr.

==== Endorsements ====
Sam Jones

Organizations

- Alabama Realtors PAC
- Business Council of Alabama

==== Results ====
Democratic primary
Party	Candidate	Votes	%
Democratic	Sam Jones (incumbent)	5,859	82.91
Democratic	Levi Wright Jr.	696	9.85
Democratic	Jyl Hughes	512	7.24
Total votes		7,067	100.00

=== Republican primary ===
==== Candidates ====
===== Nominee =====
- Charlie Watts

=== General election ===
==== Results ====
2026 Alabama's 99th House of Representatives district election
Party	Candidate	Votes	%
Democratic	Sam Jones (incumbent)		
Republican	Charlie Watts		
Write-in			
Total votes			100.00

== District 100 ==
=== Republican primary ===
==== Candidates ====
===== Nominee =====
- Mark Shirey, incumbent representative

==== Endorsements ====
Mark Shirey

Organizations

- Alabama Realtors PAC
- Business Council of Alabama
- Manufacture Alabama

=== General election ===
==== Results ====
2026 Alabama's 100th House of Representatives district election
Party	Candidate	Votes	%
Republican	Mark Shirey (incumbent)		
Write-in			
Total votes			100.00

== District 101 ==
=== Republican primary ===
==== Candidates ====
===== Nominee =====
- Chris Pringle, incumbent representative

===== Eliminated in primary =====
- Tim Manning, teacher

==== Endorsements ====
Tim Manning

Organizations

- National Association for Gun Rights
Chris Pringle

Organizations

- Alabama Realtors PAC
- Business Council of Alabama
- Manufacture Alabama
- National Rifle Association Political Victory Fund

==== Results ====
Republican primary
Party	Candidate	Votes	%
Republican	Chris Pringle (incumbent)	3,834	86.04
Republican	Tim Manning	622	13.96
Total votes		4,456	100.00

=== Democratic primary ===
==== Candidates ====
===== Nominee =====
- Joan Friedlander

=== General election ===
==== Results ====
2026 Alabama's 101st House of Representatives district election
Party	Candidate	Votes	%
Republican	Chris Pringle (incumbent)		
Democratic	Joan Friedlander		
Write-in			
Total votes			100.00

== District 102 ==
=== Republican primary ===
==== Candidates ====
===== Nominee =====
- Shane Stringer, incumbent representative

==== Endorsements ====
Shane Stringer

Organizations

- Alabama Realtors PAC
- Manufacture Alabama
- National Association for Gun Rights

=== General election ===
==== Results ====
2026 Alabama's 102nd House of Representatives district election
Party	Candidate	Votes	%
Republican	Shane Stringer (incumbent)		
Write-in			
Total votes			100.00

== District 103 ==
=== Democratic primary ===
==== Candidates ====
===== Nominee =====
- Barbara Drummond, incumbent representative

==== Endorsements ====
Barbara Drummond

Organizations

- Alabama Realtors PAC
- Business Council of Alabama
- Manufacture Alabama

=== General election ===
==== Results ====
2026 Alabama's 103rd House of Representatives district election
Party	Candidate	Votes	%
Democratic	Barbara Drummond (incumbent)		
Write-in			
Total votes			100.00

== District 104 ==
=== Republican primary ===
==== Candidates ====
===== Nominee =====
- Margie Wilcox, incumbent representative

==== Endorsements ====
Margie Wilcox

Organizations

- Alabama Realtors PAC
- Business Council of Alabama
- Manufacture Alabama

=== General election ===
==== Results ====
2026 Alabama's 104th House of Representatives district election
Party	Candidate	Votes	%
Republican	Margie Wilcox (incumbent)		
Write-in			
Total votes			100.00

== District 105 ==
=== Republican primary ===
==== Candidates ====
===== Nominee =====
- Chip Brown, incumbent representative

==== Endorsements ====
Chip Brown

Organizations

- Alabama Realtors PAC
- Business Council of Alabama
- Manufacture Alabama

=== General election ===
==== Results ====
2026 Alabama's 105th House of Representatives district election
Party	Candidate	Votes	%
Republican	Chip Brown (incumbent)		
Write-in			
Total votes			100.00

== See also ==
- List of Alabama state legislatures
