= Barbara Boyd =

Barbara Boyd may refer to:

- Barbara Boyd (Ohio politician) (1942–2022), American politician in Ohio
- Barbara Boyd (Alabama politician) (born 1937), American politician in Alabama
