= Jamie Lowe =

American politician

Chair of the Lee County, Alabama Democratic Party
- Incumbent
- Assumed office 2022

Personal details
- Born: December 9, 1999 (age 26)
- Party: Alabama Democratic Party
- Education: Auburn University

Jamie Lowe (born December 9, 1999) is an American politician. A member of the Alabama Democratic Party, he is currently serving as the chair of the Lee County Democratic Party.

== Education ==
Lowe attended Opelika High School, where he was class president. He was awarded a $40,000 scholarship, and attended Auburn University.

== Career ==
In 2017, Lowe began working with family court judge Mike Fellows, as an intern. He became a trained family and divorce mediator in 2019.

He first entered politics when he announced his run for Opelika City Council in 2020. He went on to lose the election in a runoff election, held in October. He received 44% in the first round, and 29% in the second round.

He was selected as a member of the Lee-Russell Council of Governments in December 2022.

After the withdrawal of Joe Biden from the 2024 United States presidential election, Lowe stated that some Democrats believed it was time for a transition in the party. He was captain of the Alabama delegation to the 2024 Democratic National Convention.

He announced his bid for the 82nd Alabama House of Representatives district in 2026, running in the Democratic primary against incumbent Pebblin Warren.
