= Nell Brown =

American politician

Nell Brown is a member-elect of the Alabama House of Representatives in November 2026. Brown defeated Republican incumbent Leigh Hulsey for the House District 15 seat.

== See also ==
- 2026 Alabama House of Representatives election
