= K. L. Brown =

American politician

Member of the Alabama House of Representatives from the 40th district
- In office February 2010 – November 9, 2022
- Preceded by: Lea Fite

Personal details
- Born: June 27, 1951 (age 75) Lineville, Alabama, U.S.
- Party: Republican
- Profession: Funeral director

Koven L. Brown (born June 27, 1951) is an American politician. He was a member of the Alabama House of Representatives from the 40th District, serving from 2010 to November 9, 2022. He is a member of the Republican party.

== Biography ==
Brown attended the University of South Alabama, the University of Montevallo and Jacksonville State University. He graduated from the Kentucky School of Mortuary Science in Louisville in 1971. He is a Methodist.

Alabama House of Representatives
Preceded by Lea Fite	Member of the Alabama House of Representatives; 2010-2022	Succeeded by Chad Robertson
