= Kenyatté Hassell =

American politician

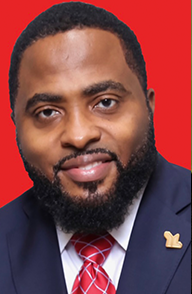

Member of the Alabama House of Representatives from the 78th district
- Incumbent
- Assumed office September 8, 2021
- Preceded by: Kirk Hatcher

Personal details
- Born: Montgomery, Alabama, U.S.
- Party: Democratic

Kenyatte Hassell is an American politician. He is a Democratic member of the Alabama House of Representatives from the 78th district, representing parts of Montgomery, Alabama. Hassell was first elected in a special election to fill the vacancy caused by then-representative Kirk Hatcher's elevation to the Alabama Senate.

Hassell won reelection without opposition in either the primary or the general election during the 2022 cycle.

In April 2023, Hassell sponsored House Bill 360 to remove Robert E. Lee’s birthday as a state holiday. It died in committee.

Hassell is running for reelection in 2026. He was renominated without opposition.

== Electoral history ==
2021 Alabama House of Representatives 78th district special election
Party	Candidate	Votes	%
Democratic	Kenyatte Hassell	1,028	80.12%
Republican	Loretta Grant	254	19.8%
Write-in		1	0.08%
Total votes		1,283	100%
Democratic hold			

2022 Alabama House of Representatives 78th district general election
Party	Candidate	Votes	%
Democratic	Kenyatte Hassell	6,991	97.8%
Write-in		160	2.2%
Total votes		7,151	100%
Democratic hold			
