= Darrio Melton =

American politician

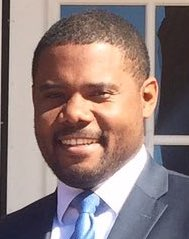
- Melton in 2016

Mayor of Selma
- In office November 7, 2016 – November 3, 2020
- Preceded by: George Evans
- Succeeded by: James Perkins Jr.

Member of the Alabama House of Representatives from the 67th district
- In office November 3, 2010 – November 7, 2016
- Preceded by: Yusuf Salaam
- Succeeded by: Prince Chestnut

Personal details
- Born: Selma, Alabama, U.S.
- Party: Democratic

Darrio Melton is an American politician who served as the Mayor of Selma from 2016 to 2020 and served in the Alabama House of Representatives from the 67th district from 2010 to 2016.
