= Manufacture Alabama =

American trade association

- Headquarters: Montgomery, Alabama
- Website: manufacturealabama.org

Manufacture Alabama is an American trade association operating in Alabama. It is based in Montgomery, Alabama, and managed by a board of directors.

== History ==
George Clark founded Manufacture Alabama in 1996.

== Activities ==
The organization issues political endorsements for state-level elections.

Alongside the Business Council of Alabama and Alabama Technology Network, the organization presents an annual Alabama Manufacturer of the Year Awards.

== See also ==
- Economy of Alabama
- List of Alabama companies
- List of industry trade groups in the United States
- Manufacturing in the United States
- National Association of Manufacturers
