= Phillip Rigsby =

American politician

Member of the Alabama House of Representatives from the 25th district
- Incumbent
- Assumed office November 9, 2022

Personal details
- Party: Republican
- Education: Auburn University (PharmD)

Phillip Rigsby is an American politician. He served as a Republican member for the 25th district of the Alabama House of Representatives. In the 2026 election, he lost his seat to Allison Montgomery, getting 47% of the vote to her 53%.
