= Kristin Nelson (politician) =

American politician

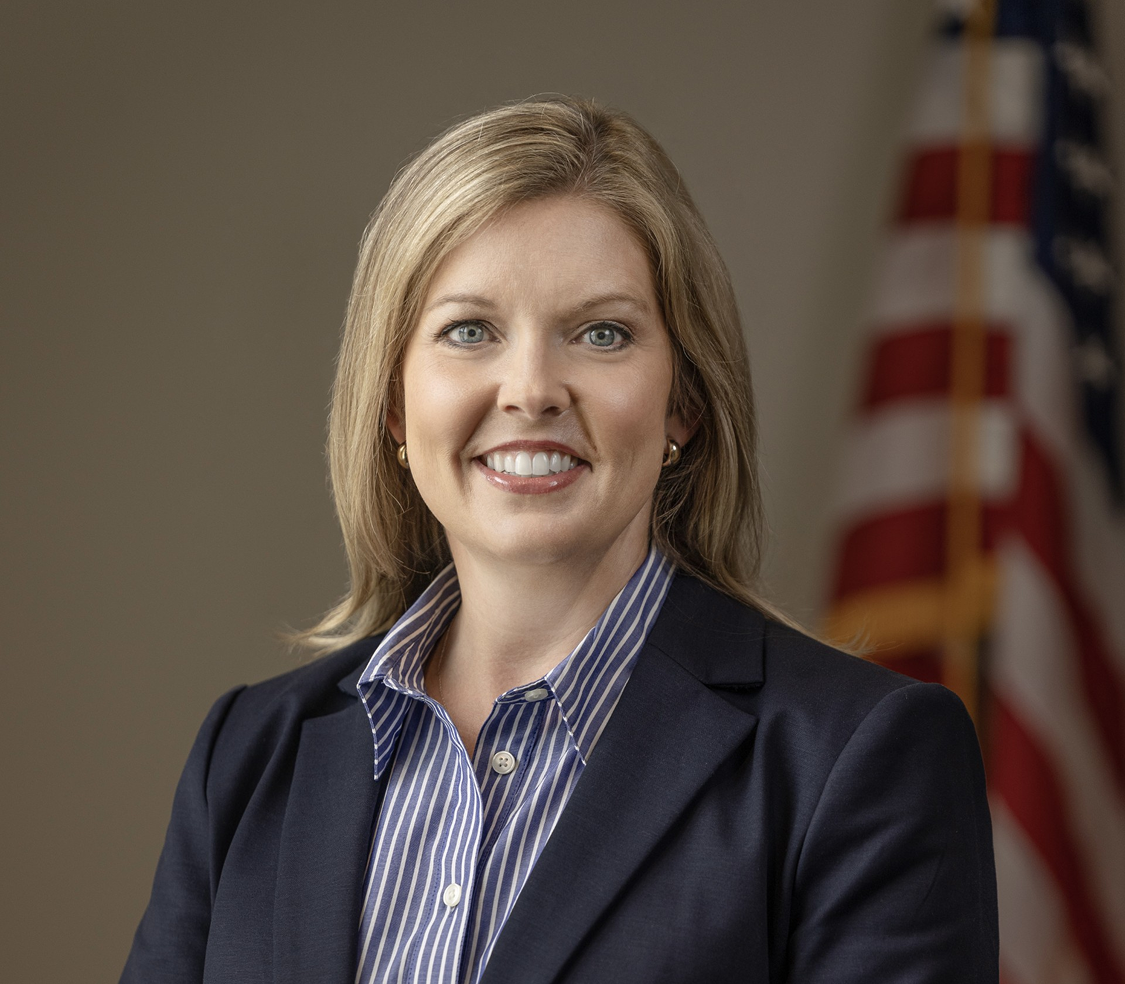

Member of the Alabama House of Representatives from the 38th district
- Incumbent
- Assumed office February 4, 2026
- Preceded by: Debbie Wood

Personal details
- Party: Republican

Kristin Nelson is an American politician who has served as the member for the 38th district of the Alabama House of Representatives since 2026.

== Political career ==
Republican Debbie Wood resigned from representing the 38th district in the Alabama House of Representatives on July 31, 2025, to move to the Florida panhandle with her husband. Nelson, the chairperson of the Chambers County Republican Party, ran for the seat, which covers parts of Chambers and Lee counties. Nelson faced fellow Republican Garrett Dixon, defeating him with about 54% of the vote. Nelson faced Democratic nominee Hazel Floyd in the general election, winning with about 85% of the vote.

Nelson is running for reelection the 2026 general election. She won the Republican primary unopposed, setting up a rematch against Democratic nominee Hazel Floyd.

== Personal life ==
Nelson is a stay-at-home mother. She resides in Lanett, Alabama.

She is the wife of Chambers County Sheriff, Jeff Nelson.

== Electoral history ==
2025 Alabama's 38th House of Representatives district special Republican primary
| Party | Candidate | Votes | % |
|---|---|---|---|
| Republican | Kristin Nelson | 1,226 | 46.69% |
| Republican | Garrett Dixon | 874 | 33.28% |
| Republican | Micah J. Messer | 526 | 20.03% |
| Total votes | | 2,626 | 100.0% |

2026 Alabama's 38th House of Representatives district special election
| Party | Candidate | Votes | % |
|---|---|---|---|
| Republican | Kristi Nelson | 1,860 | 84.89% |
| Democratic | Hazel Floyd | 331 | 15.11% |
| Total votes | | 2,191 | 100.0% |
| Republican hold | | | |
