= Debra Foster =

American politician

Member-elect of the Alabama House of Representatives from the 32nd district
- Assuming office January 2027
- Succeeding: Barbara Boyd

Personal details
- Born: 1953 or 1954 (age 72–73)
- Party: Democratic

Debra Foster (born 1953 or 1954) is an American politician. She is the Representative-elect for district 32 of the Alabama House of Representatives.

Foster served as a member of the Anniston City Council from 2004 to 2007, and as vice mayor of the city from 1995 to 2007. Outside of politics, Foster works as a real estate agent.
