= Berry Forte =

American politician

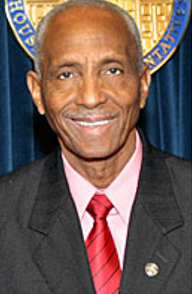

Member of the Alabama House of Representatives from the 84th district
- Incumbent
- Assumed office November 3, 2010
- Preceded by: Billy Beasley

Member of the Barbour County Commission from the 3rd district
- In office 1982–2010

Personal details
- Born: October 26, 1937 (age 88)
- Party: Democratic
- Spouse: Lillie
- Children: 2

Berry Forte (born October 26, 1937) is an American politician. He is a Democratic member of the Alabama House of Representatives from the 84th District, serving since 2010. Forte resides in Eufaula, Alabama, where he worked for American Buildings and is a member of Tabernacle Baptist Church. He previously served as a Barbour County Commissioner.
