= Shane Stringer =

American politician

Member of the Alabama House of Representatives from the 102nd district
- Incumbent
- Assumed office November 7, 2018
- Preceded by: Jack W. Williams

Personal details
- Party: Republican

Shane Stringer is an American politician and police chief in Creola, Alabama serving as a Republican member of the Alabama House of Representatives from the 102nd district. He assumed office on November 7, 2018.

== Career ==
Stringer was elected to the Alabama House of Representatives in 2018. He also served as the chief of police in Satsuma, Alabama. He later resigned from his position to serve as a captain in the Mobile County Sheriff's Office. In May 2021, Stringer was fired from his position in the sheriff's office for sponsoring constitutional carry legislation. He is currently chief of police of Creola, Alabama.
