= Alabama Farmers Federation =

Farming organization in Alabama

- Formation: 1921
- Members: Over 350,000 (2025)
- Website: alfafarmers.org

The Alabama Farmers Federation is the largest organization of farmers in Alabama, and is also an insurance company.

== History ==
The organization was founded in 1921.

== FarmPAC ==
The organization runs the FarmPAC, a political action committee. They endorse candidates in various state and federal-level elections.
