= David Standridge =

American politician

Member of the Alabama House of Representatives from the 34th district
- Incumbent
- Assumed office December 12, 2012
- Preceded by: Elwyn Thomas

Personal details
- Born: Blount County, Alabama
- Party: Republican
- Spouse: Danna
- Children: 3

David Standridge is an American politician from the state of Alabama. A member of the Republican Party, Standridge serves in the Alabama House of Representatives, representing the 34th district.

== Biography ==
Standridge is from Hayden, Alabama. He was elected to the Alabama House in 2012. He previously served as a probate judge in Blount County, Alabama. In 2014, he was elected to serve as Chairman of the House Rural Caucus. In 2016, Standridge called for Robert J. Bentley, the Governor of Alabama, to resign following allegations of an affair. In 2018 he proposed legislation, subsequently adopted by the legislature, that gives "public bodies" the right to display "In God We Trust".
