= Steve Clouse =

American politician

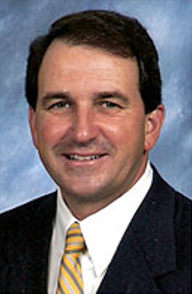

Member of the Alabama House of Representatives from the 93rd district
- Incumbent
- Assumed office 1994

Personal details
- Born: February 7, 1956 (age 70) Dale County, Alabama
- Party: Republican
- Education: University of Alabama (BA)
- Profession: businessman

Steve Clouse (born February 7, 1956) is an American politician. A Republican, he is a member of the Alabama House of Representatives from the 93rd District, serving since 1994.
