= Thomas Jackson (Alabama politician) =

American politician (born 1949)

Member of the Alabama House of Representatives from the 68th district
- Incumbent
- Assumed office 1994

Personal details
- Born: August 24, 1949 (age 76) Thomasville, Alabama, U.S.
- Party: Democratic
- Education: Selma University (AA); Knoxville College (BS); Alabama State University (MA)
- Profession: educator, pastor

Thomas E. Jackson Jr. (born August 24, 1949) is an American politician. He is a member of the Alabama House of Representatives from the 68th district, serving since 1994. He is a member of the Democratic Party.

Jackson is a member of the National Black Caucus of State Legislators.
