= Allen Treadaway =

American politician

Member of the Alabama House of Representatives from the 51st district
- Incumbent
- Assumed office November 6, 2006

Personal details
- Born: September 25, 1961 (age 65) Birmingham, Alabama, United States
- Spouse: Susan Treadaway
- Profession: Police Captain

Benjamin Allen Treadaway (born September 25, 1961) is an American politician. He is a Republican member of the Alabama House of Representatives from the 51st District, being first elected in 2006.

Treadaway served for 31 years with the Birmingham Police Department, finishing his career as the assistant chief as appointed by Mayor Randall Woodfin. He retired in September 2020.
