= Mark Shirey =

American politician

Member of the Alabama House of Representatives from the 100th district
- Incumbent
- Assumed office November 9, 2022
- Preceded by: Victor Gaston

Personal details
- Born: DeKalb County, Alabama
- Party: Republican
- Spouse: Mary
- Children: Cate
- Education: Bachelor's degree in Medical Technology, Doctorate in Optometry
- Alma mater: University of Alabama Birmingham, Southern College of Optometry
- Profession: Optometrist

Mark Shirey is an American politician who has served as a Republican member of the Alabama House of Representatives since November 8, 2022. He represents Alabama's 100th House district. He is a former president of the Alabama Optometric Association. He owns an optometry service.

== Education ==
Shirey earned a bachelor's degree in medical technology at University of Alabama Birmingham, and a doctorate in Optometry at Southern College of Optometry.

== Electoral history ==
He was elected on November 8, 2022, in the 2022 Alabama House of Representatives election against Libertarian opponent Peyton Warren. He assumed office the next day on November 9, 2022. In 2018, he ran for the Republican nomination for Alabama Senate district 34, but lost to Jack Williams.

Alabama House of Representatives
Preceded by Victor Gaston	Member of the Alabama House of Representatives; 2022–present	Succeeded by incumbent
