= Chad Robertson =

American politician

Member of the Alabama House of Representatives from the 40th district
- Incumbent
- Assumed office November 9, 2022
- Preceded by: K. L. Brown

Personal details
- Party: Republican
- Profession: Business owner

Chad Robertson is an American politician who has served as a Republican member of the Alabama House of Representatives since November 8, 2022. He represents Alabama's 40th House district.

== Electoral history ==
He was elected on November 8, 2022, in the 2022 Alabama House of Representatives election against Democratic opponent Pam Howard. He assumed office the next day on November 9, 2022. He has also served as executive director of the Cleburne County Chamber of Commerce.

== Biography ==
Robertson co-owns two businesses named Heflin Fitness and Lineville Fitness with his wife. He is a Navy veteran.

Alabama House of Representatives
Preceded by K. L. Brown	Member of the Alabama House of Representatives; 2022–present	Succeeded by incumbent
