= Prince Chestnut =

American politician

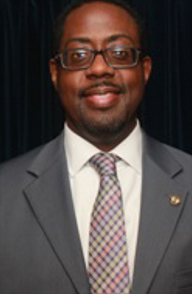

Member of the Alabama House of Representatives from the 67th district
- Incumbent
- Assumed office April 25, 2017
- Preceded by: Darrio Melton

Presiding Judge of Selma, Alabama
- In office 2007–2018
- Succeeded by: Major E. Madison Jr.

Personal details
- Party: Democratic
- Occupation: Attorney

Prince Chestnut is an American politician. He is a Democratic member of the Alabama House of Representatives, representing district 67. He was elected into office on April 18, 2017. Chestnut is also the presiding municipal court judge for the city of Selma, Alabama.

Prior to his career in politics, Chestnut worked in law.
