= Neil Rafferty =

American politician

Member of the Alabama House of Representatives from the 54th district
- Incumbent
- Assumed office November 7, 2018
- Preceded by: Patricia Todd

Personal details
- Party: Democratic
- Spouse: Michael Rudulph
- Education: University of Alabama at Birmingham
- Alma mater: University of Alabama at Birmingham (BA)

Military service
- Allegiance: United States
- Branch/service: United States Marine Corp
- Rank: Corporal
- Unit: United States Marine Corps
- Battles/wars: Global war on terrorism

Neil Rafferty is an American politician and current member of the Alabama House of Representatives, representing District 54. Winning his seat in the 2018 elections, Rafferty assumed office on November 7, 2018. He was re-elected to his position in 2022. Rafferty is a member of the Democratic Party.

Rafferty is a former member of the United States Marine Corps and veteran of the Global War on Terrorism. Prior to his election to the Alabama House of Representatives, he worked as director of research and development for Birmingham AIDS Outreach. He resides in Birmingham, Alabama with his husband and former United States Marine, Michael Rudulph.

In the legislature, Rafferty serves as the House Democratic Whip and chairs the Democratic House Caucus Platform Committee. He is a member of several committees, including Health; Economic Development and Tourism; Transportation, Utilities, and Infrastructure; and Jefferson County Legislation. He has also been appointed to the Alabama Challenge Veterans Suicide Task Force, the Opioid Overdose, Addiction, and Treatment Council, and the 988 Implementation Study Group.

Rafferty has been an outspoken advocate for women's health, minority health, LGBTQ and racial equity, veterans' issues, and Medicaid expansion. He has sponsored and passed pro-growth economic legislation, including tax incentives to address Alabama's shortage of medical professionals, especially in rural areas.

In 2024, Rafferty was honored with the Council of State Governments' 20 Under 40 Leadership Award, recognizing his commitment to public service and innovative solutions.

Among his legislative efforts, Rafferty sponsored HB 152, a bill that exempts baby formula, maternity clothing, and menstrual hygiene products from state sales tax. The Alabama House of Representatives unanimously passed the bill in March 2025.

Rafferty also introduced HB 291 in 2025, aiming to repeal the 2016 Alabama Uniform Minimum Wage and Right-to-Work Act, which prevents local governments from setting minimum wages higher than the federal minimum wage.

He resides in the Crestwood North neighborhood of Birmingham, Alabama, with his husband of 20 years, Michael Rudulph, a fellow former United States Marine, along with their dog and cat.
