= Patrick Sellers (politician) =

American politician

Member of the Alabama House of Representatives from the 57th district
- Incumbent
- Assumed office November 9, 2022

Personal details
- Party: Democratic

Patrick Sellers is an American politician. He serves as a Democratic member for the 57th district of the Alabama House of Representatives.

== Federal indictment ==
On November 19, 2026, United States federal prosecutors announced that Sellers had been indicted on four counts of wire fraud. Prosecutors alleged that he fraudulently obtained more than $240,000 in COVID-19 relief grants and loans in 2020 and 2021 and then used the money for personal expenses, including mortgage payments, college tuition, and utility payments. The alleged conduct occurred before he took office in 2022. Sellers surrendered to authorities on November 19, pleaded not guilty, and was released on a $5,000 bond. His attorney, Matt Hart, said the charges did not allege misuse of Sellers' legislative position.
