= Curtis Travis =

American politician

Member of the Alabama House of Representatives from the 72nd district
- Incumbent
- Assumed office November 9, 2022
- Preceded by: Ralph Anthony Howard

Personal details
- Born: Sawyerville, Alabama
- Party: Democratic
- Spouse: Dr. Jimmie Clark-Travis
- Children: 2
- Education: Bachelor of Science in petroleum engineering
- Alma mater: University of Alabama Master of Science in Environmental Engineering
- Profession: Builder, Assistant pastor

Curtis Travis is an American politician who has served as a Democratic member of the Alabama House of Representatives since November 8, 2022. He represents Alabama's 72nd House district.

== Electoral history ==
He was elected unopposed on November 8, 2022, in the 2022 Alabama House of Representatives election after defeating the incumbent Alabama House of Representative Ralph Anthony Howard on May 24, 2022, during the Democratic primary election. He assumed office the next day on November 9, 2022.

== Biography ==
Travis was born and bred in Sawyerville, Alabama. He graduated from Akron High School. He obtained his Bachelor of Science Degree in Petroleum Engineering from the University of Alabama. He obtained his master's degree in Environmental Engineering.

Alabama House of Representatives
Preceded by Ralph Anthony Howard	Member of the Alabama House of Representatives; 2022–present	Succeeded by incumbent
