= Kelvin Lawrence =

American politician

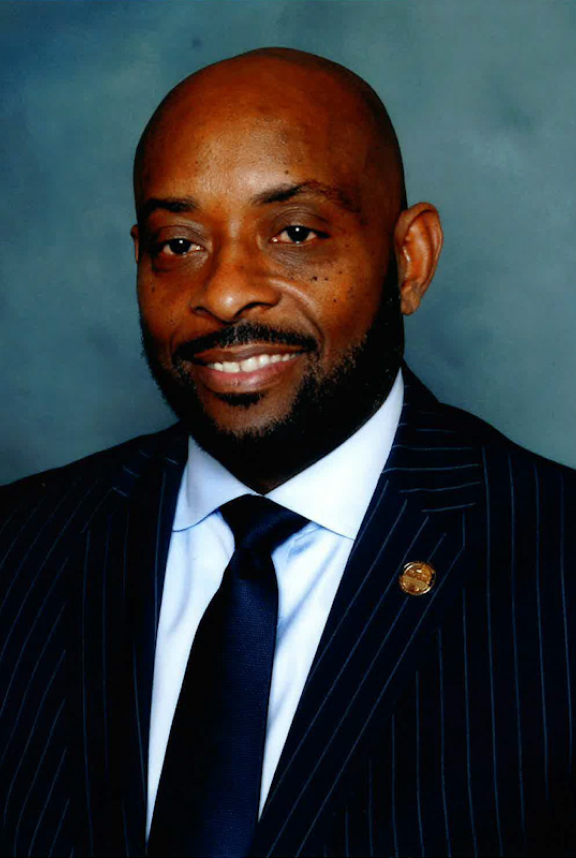

Member of the Alabama House of Representatives from the 69th district
- Incumbent
- Assumed office November 5, 2014
- Preceded by: David Colston

Personal details
- Born: November 12, 1973 (age 52) Hayneville, Alabama, U.S.
- Party: Democratic

Kelvin Lawrence (born November 12, 1973) is an American politician who has served in the Alabama House of Representatives from the 69th district since 2014. He previously served as the mayor of Hayneville, Alabama. He is a member of the Democratic Party.

On July 9, 2024, Lawrence was arrested. He was charged with two felonies: "second-degree forgery and second-degree criminal possession of a forged instrument."
