= Frances Holk-Jones =

American politician

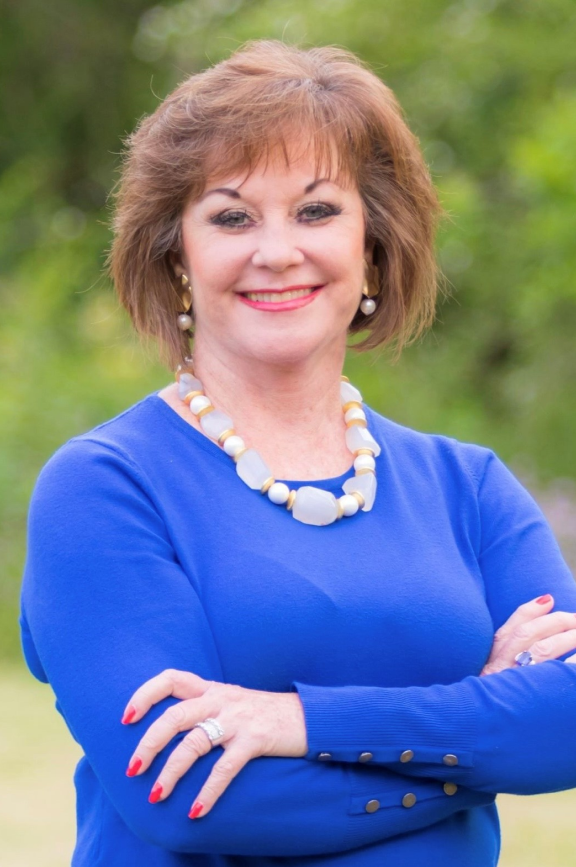

Member of the Alabama House of Representatives from the 95th district
- Incumbent
- Assumed office November 9, 2022
- Preceded by: Steve McMillian

Personal details
- Born: Baldwin County, Alabama
- Party: Republican
- Education: Bachelor of Arts
- Alma mater: Auburn University
- Profession: Business executive

Frances Holk-Jones is an American politician who has served as a Republican member of the Alabama House of Representatives since November 8, 2022. She represents Alabama's 95th House district.

== Electoral history ==
She was elected on November 8, 2022, in the 2022 Alabama House of Representatives election against Democratic opponent Richard Brackner. She assumed office the next day on November 9, 2022.

Alabama House of Representatives
Preceded by Steve McMillian	Member of the Alabama House of Representatives; 2022–present	Succeeded by incumbent
