= Rex Reynolds =

American politician

Member of the Alabama House of Representatives from the 21st district
- Incumbent
- Assumed office March 27, 2018
- Preceded by: Jim Patterson

Personal details
- Born: Rex Brian Reynolds; June 23, 1959 (age 67)
- Party: Republican

Rex Brian Reynolds is an American politician who is currently serving in the Alabama House of Representatives. He is a member of the Republican Party.
