= Jerry Starnes =

Alabamian Republican politician

Member of the Alabama House of Representatives from the 88th district
- Incumbent
- Assumed office November 9, 2022
- Preceded by: Will Dismukes

Personal details
- Party: Republican
- Spouse: Dawn Starnes
- Profession: Retired Law Enforcement Officer

Jerry Starnes is an American politician serving the 88th district, which covers Autauga County and Elmore County, in the Alabama House of Representatives. He is a member of the Republican Party.

== Biography ==
He graduated from Prattville High School in 1986. He then went into military service, where he served in the Alabama Army National Guard. He reached the rank of Lieutenant Colonel. He then earned a bachelor's degree from Troy University in 1991 in criminal justice and a master's degree in justice and public safety from Auburn University in 1996. He has worked as the Autauga County probation and parole district manager with the Alabama Bureau of Pardons and Paroles, as the executive security officer of the Governor's Mansion with the Alabama Department of Public Safety, and a correctional officer with the Alabama Department of Corrections. He has been a member of the Alabama National Guard Association, a committee chairman for the Alabama League of Municipalities, and a board member for the Prattville YMCA.

He served three terms on the Prattville city council before his election to the House of Representatives.
