= David Faulkner (politician) =

American politician

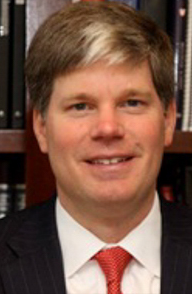

Member of the Alabama House of Representatives from the 46th district
- Incumbent
- Assumed office November 5, 2014
- Preceded by: Paul DeMarco

Personal details
- Born: June 27, 1968 (age 58)
- Party: Republican

David Faulkner (born June 27, 1968) is an American politician who has served in the Alabama House of Representatives from the 46th district since 2014. He is a member of the Republican Party.
