= Jeana Ross =

American politician

Member of the Alabama House of Representatives from the 27th district
- Incumbent
- Assumed office May 1, 2024
- Preceded by: Wes Kitchens

Personal details
- Party: Republican
- Education: University of Alabama

Jeana Ross is an American politician. She serves as a Republican member of the Alabama House of Representatives for the 27th district, which includes most of Marshall County, since winning a special election in May 2024. She graduated from the University of Alabama.

Ross previously served as secretary of the Alabama Department of Early Childhood Education under Governor Kay Ivey. She was in this position from 2012 to 2020.
