= Alan Baker (politician) =

American politician

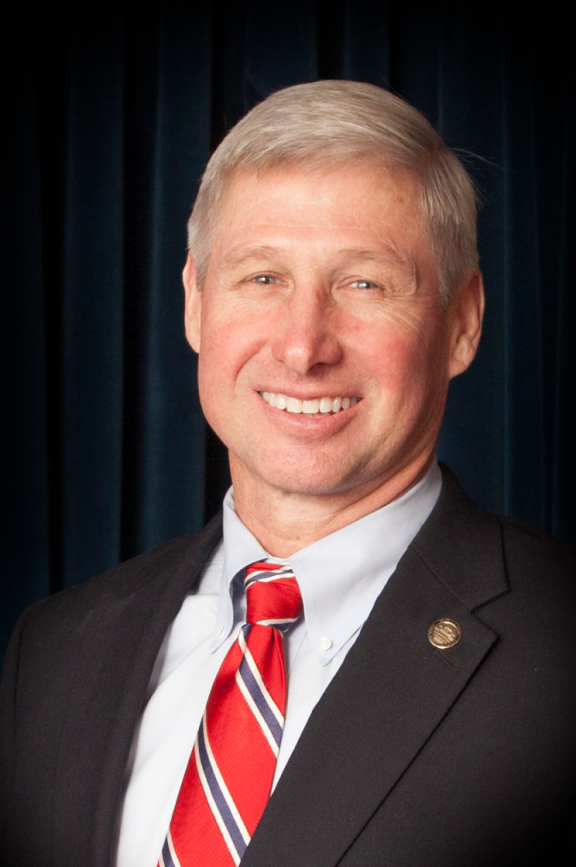

Member of the Alabama House of Representatives from the 66th district
- Incumbent
- Assumed office November 8, 2006
- Preceded by: Frank P. White

Personal details
- Born: July 15, 1956 (age 70) Brewton, Alabama
- Party: Republican
- Spouse: Kaki Stokes Baker
- Education: Auburn University
- Occupation: Educator
- Website: House Website

Alan Baker (born July 15, 1956) is a Republican member of the Alabama House of Representatives, representing the 66th district, Baldwin and Escambia counties.

Baker has represented the 66th district since 2006.
