= Terri Collins =

American politician (born 1958)

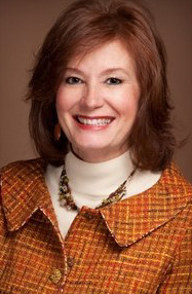

Member of the Alabama House of Representatives from the 8th district
- Incumbent
- Assumed office November 3, 2010
- Preceded by: Bill J. Dukes

Personal details
- Born: May 6, 1958 (age 68) Birmingham, Alabama, U.S.
- Party: Republican
- Spouse: Tom
- Children: 3

Terri Doyle Collins (born May 6, 1958) is an American politician. She is a member of the Alabama House of Representatives from the 8th District, serving since 2010. Collins has sponsored 469 bills as of March 1, 2017. She is a Republican.

She was born and raised in Birmingham, Alabama. She met her husband Tom while in college at the University of Alabama and moved to Decatur in 1982 to raise three children. She served as the vice president of marketing and sales of First American Bank for 16 years before election to the legislature in 2010. Tom died in early 2020.

Early in her legislative career she proposed a bill that would have prohibited making beer or wine at home.

She chairs the Education Policy Committee and serves on the Education Ways and Means Committee.

She introduced the Human Life Protection Act, a bill that Debbie Elliott of NPR said would become the most restrictive abortion ban in the United States if enacted. Alabama Gov. Kay Ivey signed the bill into law on Wednesday, May 15, 2019.

In the 2019 session of the legislature, Collins voted against a bill that expanded the seat belt requirement to include everyone in a vehicle. She said that had she been in office when the first seat belt law was proposed she would have voted against it. The bill passed.
