= Chris Sells =

American politician

Member of the Alabama House of Representatives from the 90th district
- Incumbent
- Assumed office November 5, 2014
- Preceded by: Charles O. Newton

Personal details
- Born: December 6, 1963 (age 62) Mobile, Alabama
- Party: Republican

Chris Sells (born December 6, 1963) is an American politician who has served in the Alabama House of Representatives from the 90th district since 2014. He is a member of the Republican Party.
