= Mack Butler =

American politician in Alabama

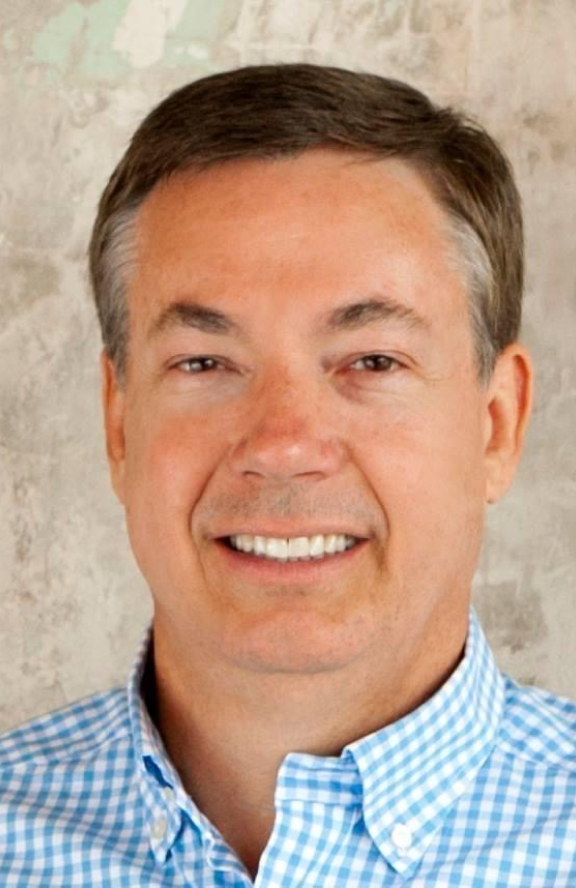
- Born: April 27, 1963 (age 63); Birmingham, Alabama, U.S.
- Education: Gadsden State Community College
- Occupation: Politician
- Political party: Republican

Mack Butler (born April 27, 1963) is an American politician. He served as a Republican member of the Alabama House of Representatives.

== Early life ==
Mack Butler was born on April 27, 1963, in Birmingham, Alabama. He grew up in Gadsden, Alabama, and he graduated from the Gadsden State Community College.

== Career ==
Butler is an electrician and property investor.

Butler was elected as a Republican member of the Alabama House of Representatives on December 11, 2012. He represents Etowah County and St. Clair County. In 2017, he sponsored a bill for the Alabama Memorial Preservation Act to make it harder to remove Confederate monuments in Alabama. He argued, "What happened in America was horrible, and it’s important we learn how horrible it was." The bill passed the house in May 2017.

Butler ran for election for the Alabama Senate District 10. He was defeated by Andrew Jones in the primary.

== Political views ==
=== Freedom From Religion Foundation ===
In December 2015, the FFRF, a Wisconsin-based legal organization stated that a concerned resident contacted them about a nativity scene at the City Hall in Rainbow City, Alabama. The organization sent a letter to the mayor and the nativity scene was removed, but soon returned to the front lawn. Butler, along with State Senator Phil Williams (R), have hosted the event as "we the people" most years since the initial incident without further action.

=== Abortion ===
Butler does not support abortion in any aspect. He calls the act of abortion "human sacrifice" as well as "pure evil". Butler is known for his political commentary on his personal Facebook page, where he has called supporters of abortion, along with all members of the democratic party "pure evil" and "guilty of murder by association". On numerous occasions Butler has stated he wants to see an end to abortion protections, such as Roe v. Wade. Butler stated "this could finally be the law that overturns Roe v. Wade" to his personal Facebook account, talking about the appeal by Alabama AG Steve Marshall after the “Alabama Unborn Child Protection from Dismemberment Act” was struck down by two lower federal courts.

== Personal life ==
With his wife Connie, he has four children. He is a Baptist.
