= Artis J. McCampbell =

American politician

Member of the Alabama House of Representatives from the 71st district
- Incumbent
- Assumed office 2006

Personal details
- Born: March 11, 1953 (age 73) Greene County, Alabama, United States
- Party: Democratic

Artis J. McCampbell (born March 11, 1953) is an American politician. He is a member of the Alabama House of Representatives from the 71st District, serving since 2006. He is a member of the Democratic Party.
