= Adline Clarke =

American politician

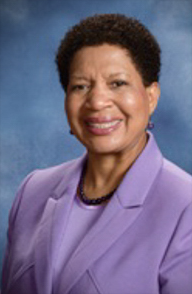

Member of the Alabama House of Representatives from the 97th district
- Incumbent
- Assumed office 2013

Personal details
- Party: Democratic
- Education: Spring Hill College

Adline Cecilia Clarke is an American politician. She has served as a Democratic member of the Alabama House of Representatives for the 97th district since 2013.

She is a former president and director of the Mobile, Alabama chapter of the National Coalition of 100 Black Women. She is Catholic.
