= Marcus Paramore =

Alabama state representative

Member of the Alabama House of Representatives from the 89th district
- Incumbent
- Assumed office November 10, 2022
- Preceded by: Wes Allen

Personal details
- Party: Republican
- Spouse: Leigh Ann Steltenpohl
- Education: Troy University (BEc, MS)
- Profession: University administrator, city councillor

Marcus Paramore is an American politician who serves in the Alabama House of Representatives, representing the 89th district, including Dale County and Pike County, since 2022. He is a member of the Republican Party.

== Education and early career ==
Paramore received a bachelor's degree in economics and a master's degree in sport and fitness management from Troy University. Paramore later became the director of government relations at Troy University. He also worked as a staffer to U.S. Representative Terry Everett. Paramore was first elected to the city council of Troy, Alabama, in 2012 and was re-elected in 2016, representing the city's third district. He became president of the city council by 2018. During his tenure on the city council, Paramore helped develop industry in the area, including the establishment of a Kimber Manufacturing facility, in addition to Rex Lumber and various other retailers. In May 2022, Paramore was appointed to a state board for watershed management in Pike County, Alabama.

== Alabama House of Representatives ==
In May 2021, Paramore announced that he would seek the Republican nomination for the Alabama House of Representatives' 89th district in 2022. The seat became open after Wes Allen retired to successfully run for Secretary of State of Alabama. Paramore stated that he was running to further economic development, and advertised his belief in traditional conservative values, including "family, faith and hard work." Paramore was unopposed in both the Republican primary and the general election. Paramore won the election and took office in November 2022.

As of 2023, Paramore serves on the House committees for State Government, Education Policy, Financial Services and Fiscal Responsibility.

== Personal life ==
Paramore is married to his wife Leigh Ann (née Steltenpohl); the couple have two sons. The Paramores attend Park Memorial United Methodist Church in Troy, Alabama.
