= Matt Simpson (Alabama politician) =

Alabama House representative

Matt Simpson is an American politician currently serving in his second term in the Alabama House of Representatives for House District 96, which he was elected to in November 2018. He is a member of the Republican Party.

== Early life and education ==
Simpson was born and raised in Mobile, where he attended Murphy High School. He earned a bachelor's degree in political science with a minor in criminal justice from the University of Alabama and has a Juris Doctor degree from Samford University Cumberland School of Law, where he served on the Student Honor Board and was a member of the National Mock Trial Team.

For 12 years, Simpson had a career as a prosecutor for the Mobile County District Attorney's Office and as child victims prosecutor for the Baldwin County District Attorney's Office. He currently serves as an assistant district attorney in Mobile County.

Simpson previously served as chairman of the Baldwin County Republican Party and of the Baldwin County Young Republicans. Simpson has served on the Alabama Republican Party State Executive Committee and is the former ALGOP vice-chairman for Congressional District 1 from 2021 to January 2025.

== Political career ==
Simpson is currently a member of several legislative committees, including the Judiciary Committee; the Ethics and Campaign Finance Committee; the Commerce and Small Business Committee; the Sunset Committee; the Ports, Waterways and Intermodal Transit Committee; the Constitution, Campaigns and Elections Committee and the Baldwin County Legislation Committee. He serves as vice chairman of the Joint Legislative Committee for Aerospace and Defense and is a member of the Joint Legislative Committee for Mental Health. Simpson also serves as a member of the Joint Legislative Prison Oversight Committee.

In 2021, Representative Simpson was named as chairman of the Baldwin County Legislation Committee. In 2022, he was elected as Caucus Freshman Representative for the Alabama House Republican Caucus.

Prior to the beginning of the 2023 Legislative Session, Simpson was named chairman of the House Ethics and Campaign Finance Committee and was also named to the Historical Records Advisory Board Legislative Oversight Committee and the Legislative Committee on Public Accounts.

== Key issues and legislation ==
=== Fentanyl Abuse ===
In 2023, Simpson sponsored legislation that imposed a series of mandatory minimum sentences for individuals found guilty of trafficking fentanyl, which passed the House and the Senate unanimously. Under the new law created by Simpson's legislation, a minimum sentence of 3 years in prison and a $50,000 fine would be given for fentanyl possession between 1 and 2 grams; a minimum sentence of 10 years and a $100,000 fine would be given for possession of 2 to 4 grams; and more than 8 grams would garner a sentence of life in prison and a fine of at least $750,000.

=== Mental health ===
Simpson sponsored and passed legislation that funded and created the Baldwin County Mental Health Court, a diversionary court program that places people with mental illnesses into treatment programs in lieu of jail time and secured a $100,000 grant to hasten the program's implementation. He has also sponsored legislation that would cover the costs of treatment for Post Traumatic Stress Disorder for first responders.

=== Public safety ===
Simpson sponsored and passed legislation to create the Alabama State of Emergency Consumer Protection Act, which created the crime of aggravated home repair fraud. He also sponsored legislation that makes possessing a stolen firearm a Class C felony in Alabama and legislation that added enhanced sentences for people convicted of child sex abuse.

=== Ethics reform ===
In the 2024 Legislative Session, Simpson attempted to pass updates and reforms to clarify Alabama's ethics laws that directly effect more than 300,000 public officials and employees in the state. Simpson's bill passed the Alabama House with bipartisan support but failed to make it out of committee in the Alabama Senate.

=== Death penalty ===
In 2024, Simpson proposed a death penalty bill for child rapists, that could ultimately challenge the precedent of Kennedy v. Louisiana. The bill is similar to the laws passed in Florida and Tennessee.

On February 5, 2025, the Alabama House Judiciary Committee approved the proposed legislation. On February 11, 2025, the Alabama House of Representatives passed the bill with an 86–5 vote, with nine abstentions. The bill would fail in the senate in 2025. Simpson reintroduced the bill again in 2026. The 2016 bill passed the house on January 27, 2026, on a 73-6- with 17 abstentions vote. It passed in the senate in February 2026 with a 33–1 vote. On 12 February 2026, Governor Kay Ivey signed the bill into law.
