= Chris Blackshear =

American politician

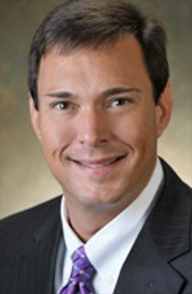

Member of the Alabama House of Representatives from the 80th district
- Incumbent
- Assumed office January 29, 2016
- Preceded by: Lesley Vance

Personal details
- Born: March 11, 1974 (age 52)
- Party: Republican

Chris Blackshear (born March 11, 1974) is an American politician who has served in the Alabama House of Representatives from the 80th district since his victory in a special election in 2016. He was elected to a full term in 2018. He is a member of the Republican Party.
