= Steve Hurst =

American politician

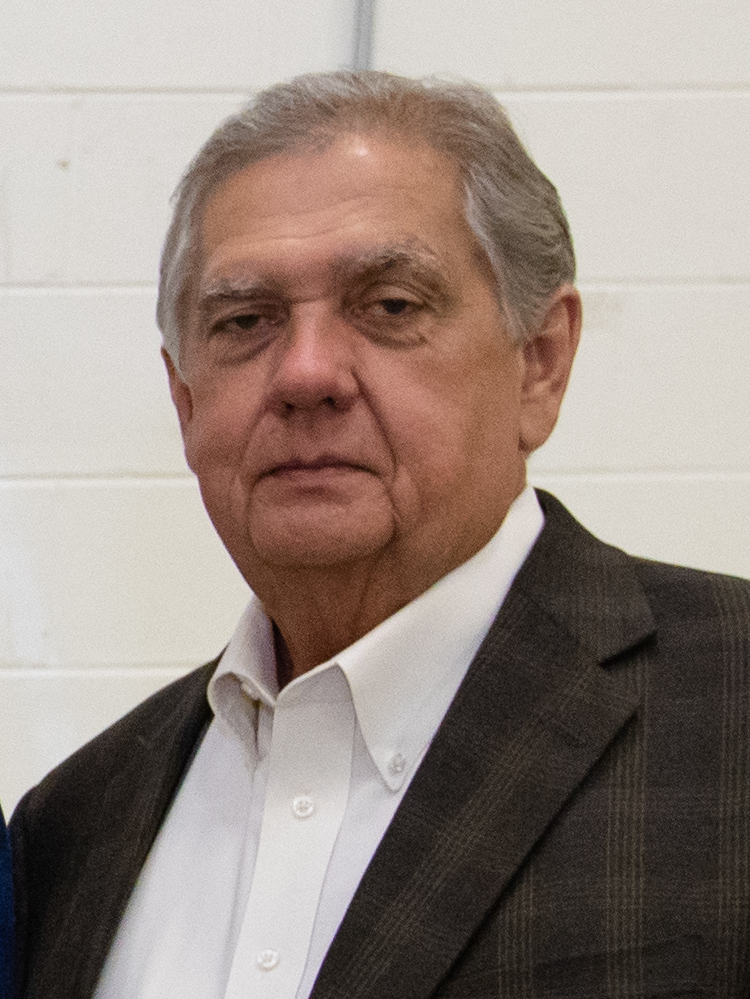
- Hurst in 2021

Member of the Alabama House of Representatives from the 35th district
- Incumbent
- Assumed office January 20, 1998

Personal details
- Born: 1948 or 1949 (age 77–78)
- Party: Democratic (before 2010); Republican (2010-present)
- Profession: Businessman

Steve Hurst (born c. 1948) is an American politician. He is a member of the Alabama House of Representatives from the 35th District, serving since 1998. He is a member of the Republican Party.

Starting 2013, Hurst gained national media attention for sponsoring a measure to legalize the practice of chemical castration for sex offenders. Hurst's bill eventually passed in 2019.

By 2021, however, Alabama Department of Public Health told reporters they have never actually administered medication for chemical castration since the bill passed. Writer Caroline Beck pointed out the state's statute is may be moot: while chemical castration is imposed as a condition of parole, crimes which qualify for chemical castration are ineligible for parole entirely.
