= Jamie Kiel =

American politician

Member of the Alabama House of Representatives from the 18th district
- Incumbent
- Assumed office November 6, 2018
- Preceded by: Johnny Mack Morrow

Personal details
- Born: Jamie Glenn Kiel; December 9, 1974 (age 51)
- Party: Republican
- Children: 3

Jamie Glenn Kiel is an American politician from the state of Alabama. He currently serves as a member of the Alabama House of Representatives for District 18. He is a member of the Republican Party.

== Education ==
Kiel graduated from Northwest–Shoals Community College with an Associate's degree in business in 1995. After graduating, Kiel enrolled in the University of North Alabama where he earned a B.S. in Business, Management, Marketing, and Related Support Services in 1997.

== Career ==
In 1996, while Kiel was enrolled in the University of North Alabama, he started his equipment rental company, Kiel Equipment. Kiel still runs the company today. In 2013, Kiel became a managing partner with SAL Properties, a property management company. During his time as owner of Kiel Equipment, Kiel also became a founding member of the Franklin County Broadband Taskforce and a member of the Federal Monitoring Committee for the Franklin County School System. Kiel announced his run for State House in 2017, after Representative Johnny Mack Morrow announced that he would not be running for reelection. Kiel defeated his Republican Primary opponent, Tony Riley, winning 79.9% of the vote. Kiel then defeated his Democratic opponent, Eddie Britton, by a margin of over 40 points.

=== Committee positions ===
Kiel is a member of the Insurance, State Government, and is Vice-Chair of the Ways and Means Education committees.

== Elections ==
=== Alabama House of Representatives District 18 ===
==== 2018 Republican Primary ====
2018 Republican Primary
Party	Candidate	Votes	%
Republican	Jamie Kiel	4,312	79.9%
Republican	Tony Riley	1,085	20.1%
Total votes		5,397	100.0%

==== 2018 General Election ====
2018 General Election
Party	Candidate	Votes	%
Republican	Jamie Kiel	9,845	71.7%
Democratic	Eddie Britton	3,886	28.3%
Write-in		8	0.1%
Total votes		13,739	100.0%
