= Joe Lovvorn =

American politician

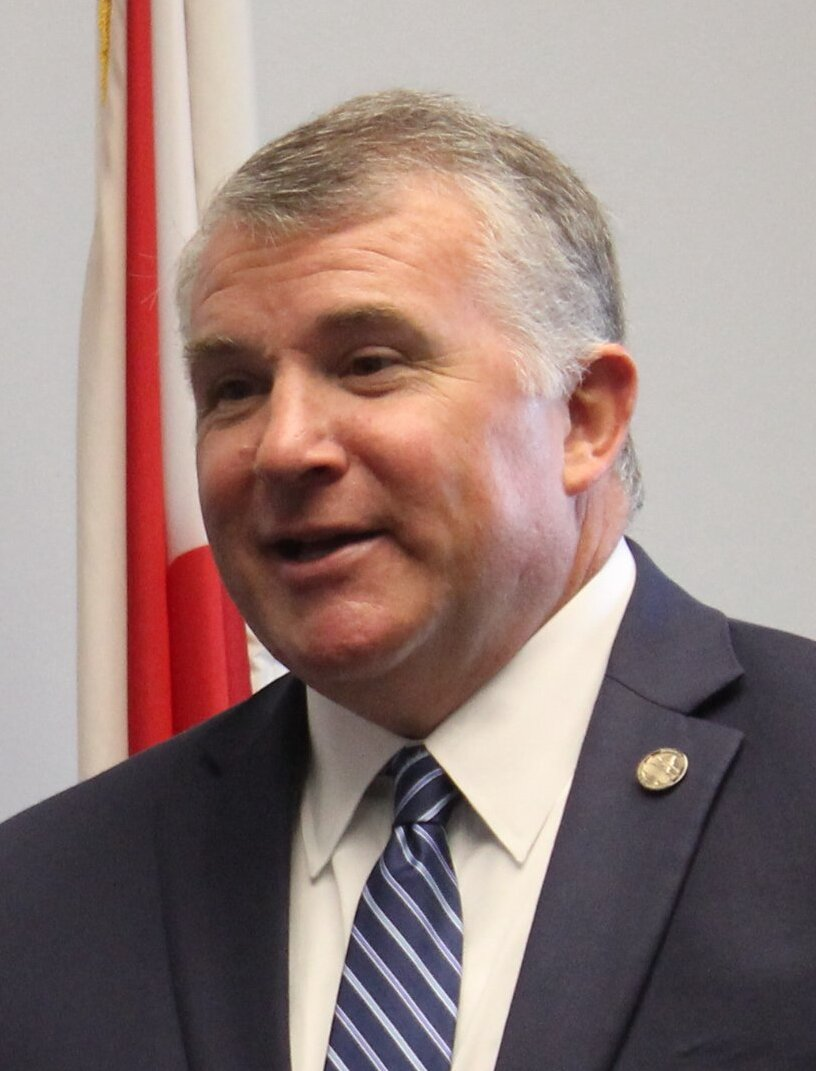
- Lovvorn in 2024

Member of the Alabama House of Representatives from the 79th district
- Incumbent
- Assumed office 2016
- Preceded by: Mike Hubbard

Personal details
- Born: September 5, 1976 (age 49)
- Party: Republican
- Education: Auburn University (BS, MBA)

Joe Lovvorn (born September 5, 1976) is an American businessman, firefighter, and politician serving as a Republican member of the Alabama House of Representatives from the 79th district. He assumed office in 2016.

== Early life and education ==
Lovvorn was raised in Graham, Alabama. He earned a Bachelor of Science degree from the Auburn University College of Agriculture and Master of Business Administration from Auburn University.

== Career ==
Lovvorn has worked as a battalion fire chief for the city of Auburn, Alabama. He has also worked as a real estate broker with HomeServices of America and owns a trucking company. He was elected to the Alabama House of Representatives in 2015 and assumed office in 2016. Since 2019, he has served as chair of the House Technology and Research Committee and House Lee County Legislation Committee.
