= Corley Ellis =

American politician

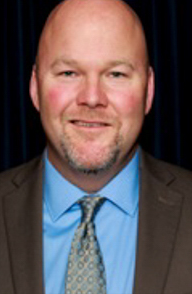

Member of the Alabama House of Representatives from the 41st district
- Incumbent
- Assumed office October 20, 2016
- Preceded by: Mike Hill

Personal details
- Party: Republican
- Spouse: Julie
- Children: 1

Corley Ellis is an American politician who has served as a Republican member of the Alabama House of Representatives since first winning election in 2016.

In 1993, Ellis earned a BS degree in business administration from Auburn University. In 1995, he earned an MBA degree, also from Auburn. Ellis is the owner of Ellis Property Inc, a real estate brokerage firm.

Ellis' political career began when he served as Shelby County Commissioner for District 1.

On October 18, 2016, Ellis won the special election in District 41 in the Alabama House of Representatives. Ellis replaced Mike Hill. On November 6, 2018, Ellis won re-election and remained a member of the Alabama House of Representatives.

Ellis' wife is Julie Harris Ellis. They have a son. Ellis resides in Shelby County, Alabama.
