= Jeff Sorrells =

American politician

Member of the Alabama House of Representatives from the 87th district
- Incumbent
- Assumed office November 7, 2018
- Preceded by: Donnie Chesteen

Personal details
- Born: 1959 (age 66–67)
- Party: Republican
- Profession: banker

Jeff Sorrells (born 1959) is an American politician. He is a Republican member of the Alabama House of Representatives from the 87th District, serving since 2019. Sorrells was previously the mayor of Hartford, Alabama and is a vice president of the First National Bank of Hartford, Alabama.
