= Alabama Realtors PAC =

American political action committee

- Headquarters: 522 Washington Avenue; Montgomery, Alabama; 36104
- Website: alabamarealtors.com

The Alabama Realtors PAC is an American political action committee in the state of Alabama. It represents the interests of real estate employees across the state. It is managed by the Alabama Association of Realtors, which was founded in 1922. They endorse and support candidates for state office.
