= Mary Moore (Alabama politician) =

American politician

Member of the Alabama House of Representatives from the 56th district
- Incumbent
- Assumed office 2002

Personal details
- Born: July 23, 1948 (age 78) Birmingham, Alabama, U.S.
- Party: Democratic
- Education: Tuskegee University (BS); Alabama A&M University (MBA)
- Profession: Medical Technologist

Mary Moore (born July 23, 1948) is an American politician. She is a member of the Alabama House of Representatives from the 56th District, serving since 2002. She is a member of the Democratic party.
