= Reed Ingram =

American politician

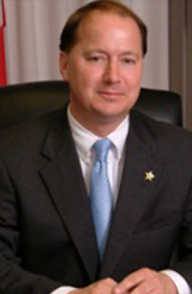

Member of the Alabama House of Representatives from the 75th district
- Incumbent
- Assumed office 2014
- Preceded by: Gregory D. Wren

Personal details
- Born: 1962 (age 63–64)
- Party: Republican
- Profession: Owner, Sweet Creek Farm Market (previously Car Dealer)

Robert Reed Ingram (born 1962) is an American politician. He serves as a Republican member of the Alabama House of Representatives for District 75, encompassing parts of Elmore County and Montgomery County.
