= Rolanda Hollis =

American politician

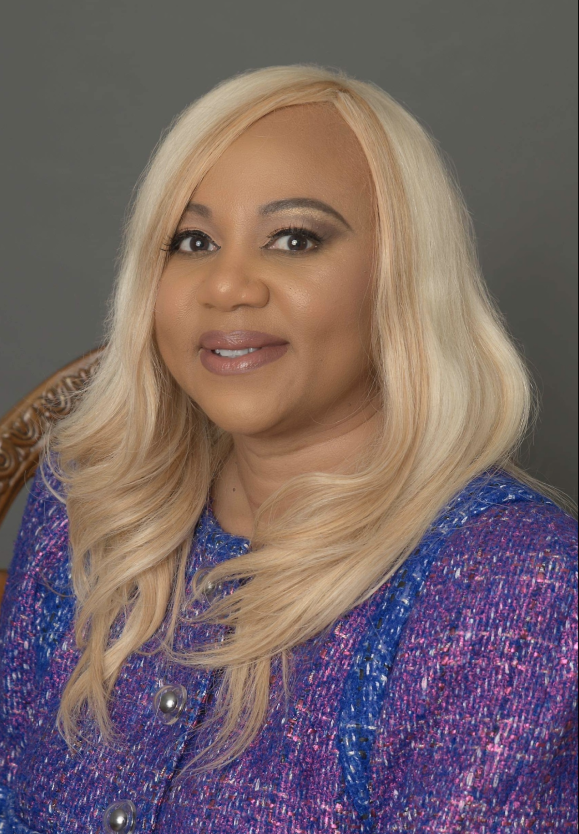

Member of the Alabama House of Representatives from the 58th district
- Incumbent
- Assumed office March 7, 2017
- Preceded by: Oliver Robinson

Personal details
- Party: Democratic
- Education: Tuskegee University

Rolanda Hollis is an American politician. She serves as a Democratic member of the Alabama House of Representatives for the 58th district. She replaced Oliver Robinson in the seat.

== Arrest for domestic violence ==
The Northwest Florida Daily News and other outlets reported that Hollis was arrested for misdemeanor domestic violence at the Inn on Destin Harbor in Destin, Florida on September 22, 2019. Responding police found "obvious signs of a disturbance, including broken glass", and a witness reported seeing Hollis shoving her husband, Aaron Jefferson, at approximately 11 PM. Hollis and her husband denied there was a physical altercation, although Hollis admitted to throwing a glass. Hollis was arrested and released the next day from Okaloosa County Jail after posting bail on Monday September 23, 2019.

== Compulsory sterilization legislation ==
In 2020, Hollis introduced HB 238, a bill that would require all males to undergo sterilization by vasectomy after the birth of their third child or prior to their 50th birthday, whichever comes first. Men would be required to pay for the procedure themselves. Hollis claimed that her plan for forced sterilizations of men would “neutralize" the Alabama Human Life Protection Act, a bill restricting abortion which was made law in 2019.
