= Leigh Hulsey =

American politician

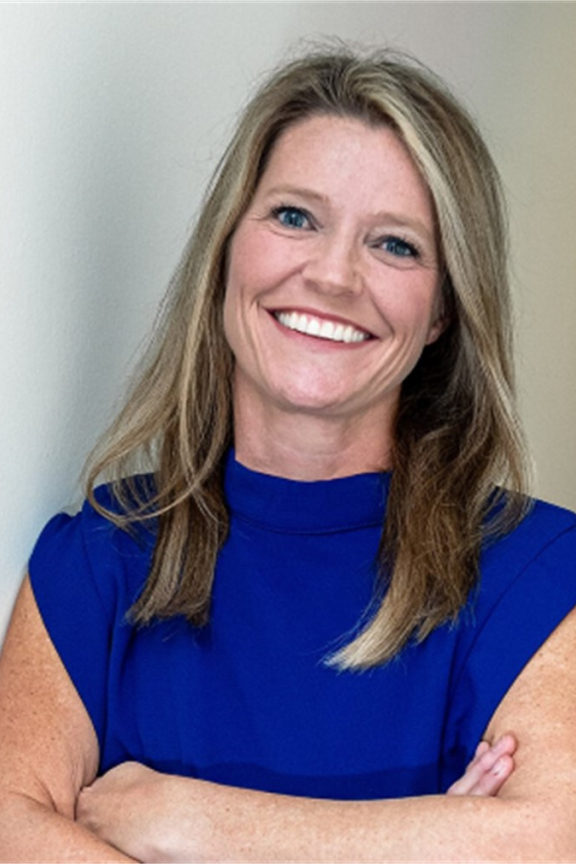

Member of the Alabama House of Representatives from the 15th district
- Incumbent
- Assumed office November 9, 2022
- Preceded by: Allen Farley

Personal details
- Party: Republican
- Spouse: Dennis
- Children: 3
- Profession: Business owner

Leigh Hulsey is an American politician who has served as a Republican member of the Alabama House of Representatives since November 8, 2022. She represents Alabama's 15th House district.

== Electoral history ==
She was elected on November 8, 2022, in the 2022 Alabama House of Representatives election against Democratic opponent Richard Rouco. She assumed office the next day on November 9, 2022. She is a member of the Helena city council.

== Biography ==
Hulsey is a Christian.

Alabama House of Representatives
Preceded by Allen Farley	Member of the Alabama House of Representatives; 2022–present	Succeeded by incumbent
