= ProgressPAC =

Political action committee in Alabama, US

- Founded: 1993
- Chairman: Gary Smith

ProgressPAC is a political action committee based in the U.S. state of Alabama. It is the political branch of the Business Council of Alabama (BCA).

== History ==
The organization was founded in 1993.

In 2022, ProgressPAC gave close to $1.4 million to candidates in the state of Alabama. The organization primarily donates to Alabama Legislature candidates.

In 2024, Nick Saban spoke at an event organized by the BCA to fund for the PAC.
