= Pebblin Warren =

American politician

Member of the Alabama House of Representatives from the 82nd district
- Incumbent
- Assumed office 2005

Personal details
- Born: April 15, 1952 (age 74) Burke County, Georgia, United States
- Party: Democratic

Pebblin W. Warren (born April 15, 1952) is an American politician. She is a member of the Alabama House of Representatives from the 82nd District, serving since 2005. She is a member of the Democratic Party.
