= Barbara Boyd (Alabama politician) =

American politician

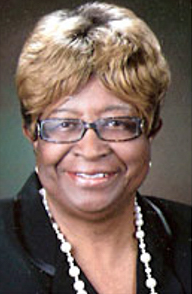

Member of the Alabama House of Representatives from the 32nd district
- Incumbent
- Assumed office 1994

Personal details
- Born: January 31, 1937 (age 89) Anniston, Alabama, U.S.
- Party: Democratic

Barbara Bigsby Boyd (born January 31, 1937) is an American politician. She is a Democratic member of the Alabama House of Representatives from the 32nd District, serving since 1994. She is the Democratic Caucus Vice Chair and a member of the National Black Caucus of State Legislators.
