= 2026 Alabama State Auditor election =

- November 3, 2026
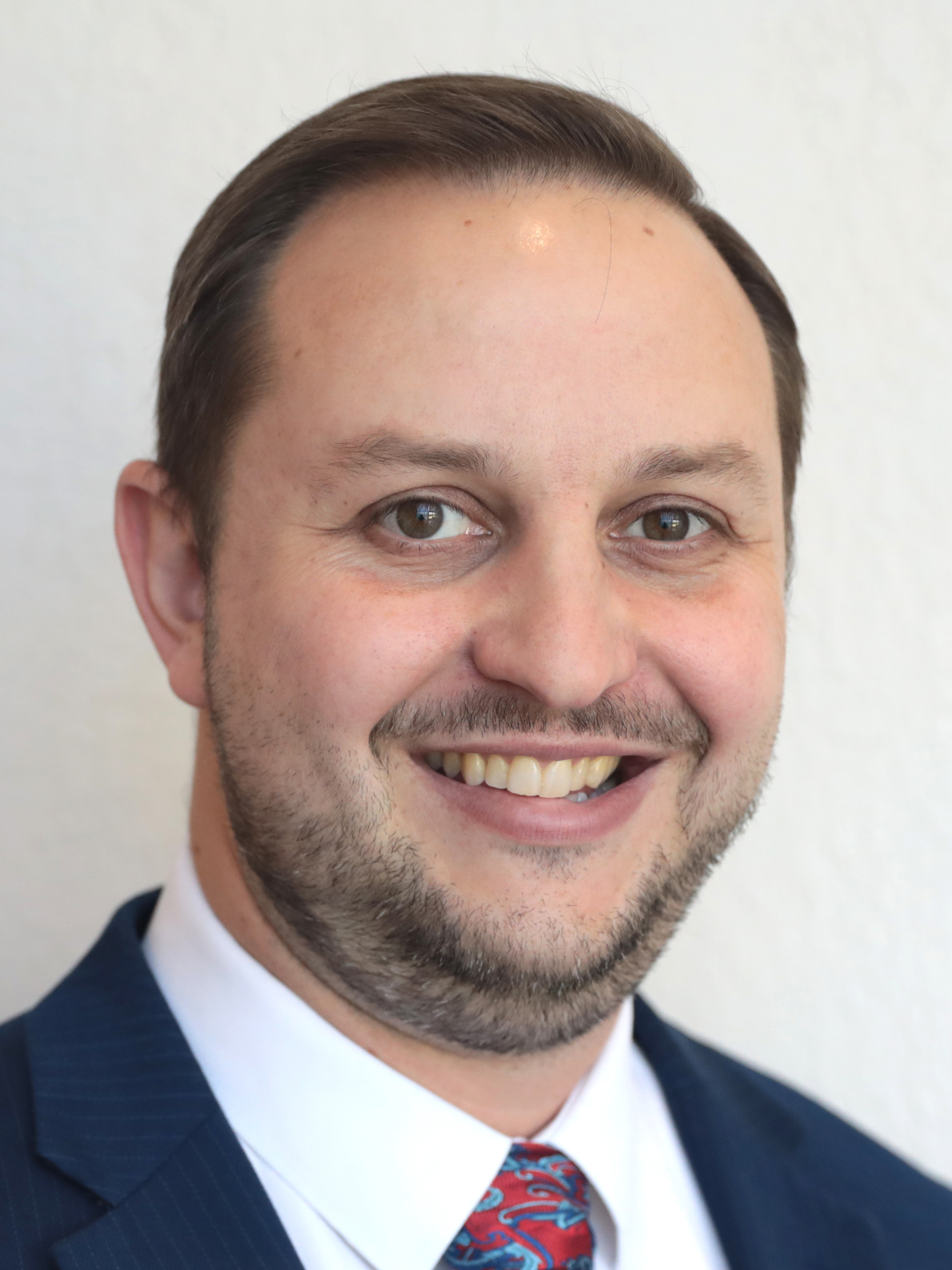

| Candidate | Andrew Sorrell | Violet Edwards |
| Party | Republican | Democratic |
| Popular vote | 918,156 | 744,567 |
| Percentage | 55.2% | 44.8% |
- Sorrell: 50–60% 60–70% 70–80% 80–90% Edwards: 50–60% 60–70% 70–80% 80–90%
State Auditor before election
Andrew Sorrell
Republican
Elected State Auditor
Andrew Sorrell
Republican

The 2026 Alabama State Auditor election was held on November 3, 2026, to elect the state auditor of Alabama. The primary election was held on May 19. Incumbent auditor Andrew Sorrell initially announced that he was retiring to run for secretary of state. He later announced that he would withdraw from that election and instead run for re-election to a second consecutive term.

== Republican primary ==
=== Candidates ===
==== Nominee ====
- Andrew Sorrell, incumbent state auditor (2023–present) (previously ran for Secretary of State)

==== Eliminated in primary ====
- Derek Chen, businessman and lawyer

==== Withdrawn ====
- Robert McCollum, candidate for the Alabama Public Service Commission in 2022 and 2024 (endorsed Chen)
- Josh Pendergrass, former communications director for Governor Kay Ivey (ran for state house)

=== Endorsements ===
Derek Chen

Organizations

- Alabama Farmers Federation
- Alabama Forestry Association
- Business Council of Alabama
- Electric Cooperatives of Alabama
- Manufacture Alabama

=== Fundraising ===
Campaign finance reports as of May 18, 2026
| Candidate | Raised | Other receipts | Spent | Cash on hand |
|---|---|---|---|---|
| Derek Chen (R) | $516,172 | $575,314 | $1,088,588 | $2,927 |
| Andrew Sorrell (R) | $61,938 | $162,600 | $223,620 | $4,917 |
Source: Alabama FCPA

=== Campaign ===
On February 24, 2025, incumbent state auditor Andrew Sorrell told 1819 News that he would forgo reelection and instead run in the 2026 Alabama Secretary of State election, seeking the office of Alabama Secretary of State. This initially left the office of state auditor open in 2026.

In June 2025, the College Republican Federation of Alabama announced the results of their first straw poll. Chen led with 47%, Pendergrass received 30%, and "Other" received the remaining 22%. Following the release of the results, Robert McCollum compared the organization to Nazis and communists. McCollum had not yet filed with the Secretary of State's office. He withdrew from the election on September 17, and endorsed Chen.

Shortly after candidate qualifying opened in January 2026, Sorrell announced that he would withdraw from the Secretary of State election, and would instead run for re-election to a second term as state auditor. Derek Chen, who had previously received several endorsements from statewide organizations such as the Alabama Farmers Federation, confirmed that he would remain in the race, and told 1819 News, "I'm just going to stay focused on continuing to run our game plan".

=== Results ===
Primary results by county: Sorrell: 50–60%; 60–70%; 70–80%; 80–90%

Republican primary results
| Party | Candidate | Votes | % |
|---|---|---|---|
| Republican | Andrew Sorrell (incumbent) | 300,160 | 67.9 |
| Republican | Derek Chen | 141,651 | 32.1 |
| Total votes | | 441,811 | 100.0 |

== Democratic primary ==
=== Candidates ===
==== Nominee ====
- Violet Edwards, Madison County commissioner

=== Endorsements ===
Violet Edwards

U.S. senators

- Doug Jones, Alabama (2018–2021) and candidate for governor in 2026

=== Fundraising ===
Campaign finance reports as of May 18, 2026
| Candidate | Raised | Other receipts | Spent | Cash on hand |
|---|---|---|---|---|
| Violet Edwards (D) | $20,751 | $2,213 | $11,589 | $11,375 |
Source: Alabama FCPA

== General election ==
=== Post-primary endorsements ===
Violet Edwards (D)

Organizations

- Alabama AFL-CIO

=== Fundraising ===
Campaign finance reports as of November 2, 2026
| Candidate | Raised | Other receipts | Spent | Cash on hand |
|---|---|---|---|---|
| Andrew Sorrell (R) | $147,324 | $217,634 | $312,008 | $52,950 |
| Violet Edwards (D) | $62,399 | $2,237 | $44,831 | $19,805 |
Source: Alabama FCPA

=== Results ===
2026 Alabama State Auditor election
| Party | Candidate | Votes | % |
|---|---|---|---|
| Republican | Andrew Sorrell (incumbent) | 918,156 | 55.19 |
| Democratic | Violet Edwards | 744,567 | 44.75 |
| Write-in | | 1,029 | 0.29 |
| Total votes | | 1,663,752 | 100.00 |
