= Caroleene Dobson =

American politician (born 1986/7)

Secretary of State-elect of Alabama
- Assuming office January 2027
- Governor: Tommy Tuberville (elect)
- Succeeding: Wes Allen

Personal details
- Born: 1986 or 1987 (age 39–40) Beatrice, Alabama, U.S.
- Party: Republican
- Education: Harvard University (BA); Baylor University (JD)

Caroleene Dobson (born 1986/1987) is an American politician who is the Secretary of State-elect of Alabama. She was previously the nominee for Alabama's 2nd congressional district in 2024.

== Early life and education ==
Dobson was born in Beatrice, Alabama, and raised on a cattle farm. She graduated from Harvard College before attending Baylor Law School.

== Career ==
=== Alabama Forestry Commission ===
In 2022, Dobson was appointed by Governor Kay Ivey to serve on the Board of the Alabama Forestry Commission. She was subsequently elected Vice Chair of the board, a position she will hold until November 2026.

=== U.S. House campaign ===
In 2024, Dobson announced that she would run for the open 2nd congressional seat following court-mandated redistricting in the state. She defeated state senator Dick Brewbaker in the Republican primary runoff election, receiving 58% of the vote. In the general election, she was defeated by Democratic nominee Shomari Figures, who received 54% of the vote.

=== Alabama Secretary of State ===
Dobson announced that she was running in the 2026 Alabama Secretary of State election on June 26, 2025. Her main primary opponent was expected to be state auditor Andrew Sorrell, but he dropped his bid in January 2026 to run for re-election.

== Personal life ==
Dobson is married and has two children.

Political offices
Preceded by Wes Allen	Secretary of State of Alabama; Taking office 2027	Elect
