= 2026 Alabama Secretary of State election =

- November 3, 2026

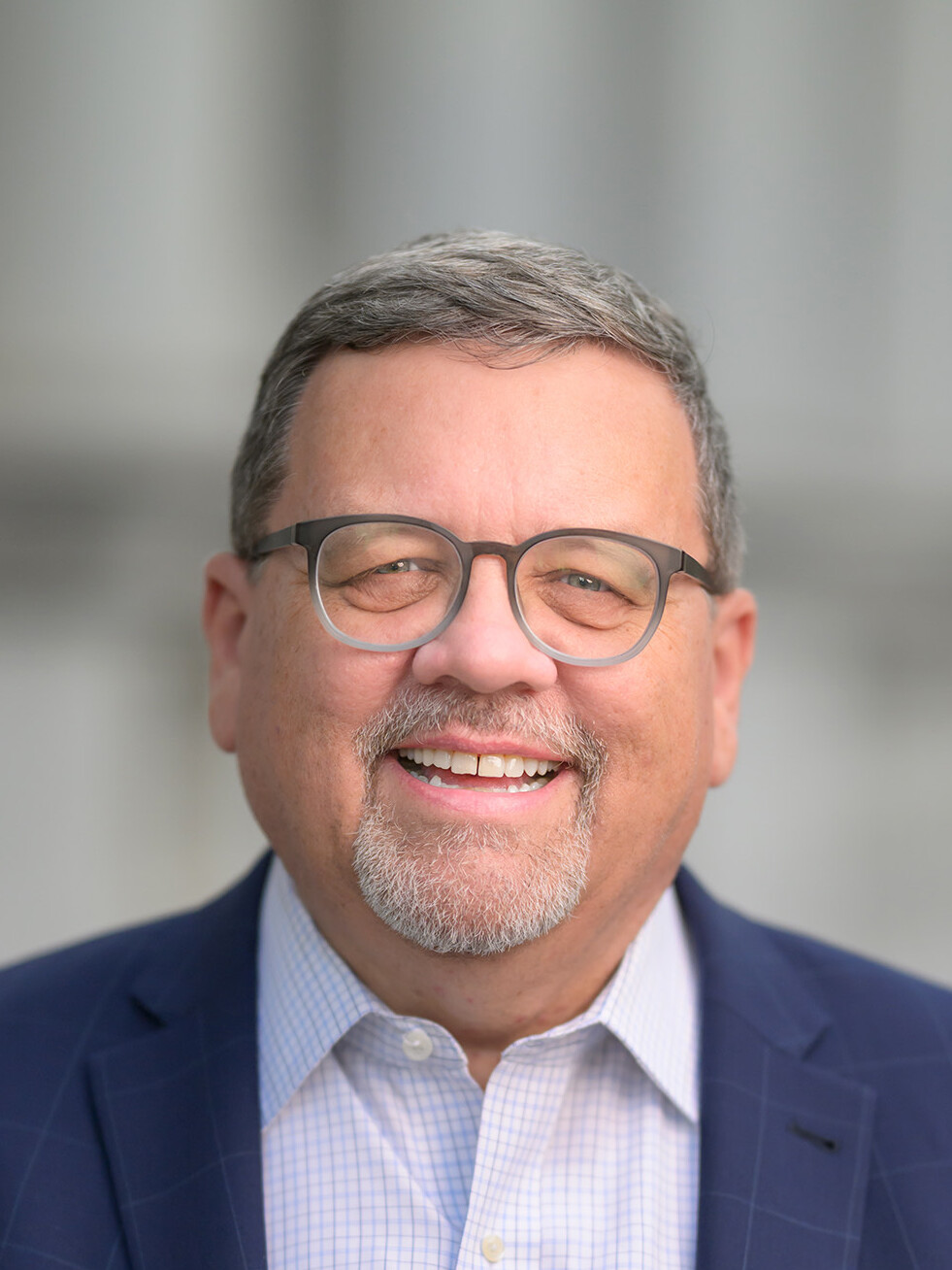
| Candidate | Caroleene Dobson | Wayne Rogers |
| Party | Republican | Democratic |
| Popular vote | 909,486 | 756,535 |
| Percentage | 54.59% | 45.41% |
- Dobson: 50–60% 60–70% 70–80% 80–90% Rogers: 50–60% 60–70% 70–80% 80–90%
Secretary of State before election
Wes Allen
Republican
Elected Secretary of State
Caroleene Dobson
Republican

The 2026 Alabama Secretary of State election was held on November 3, 2026, to elect the next Secretary of State of Alabama. The primary election was held on May 19. Incumbent secretary of state Wes Allen retired to run for lieutenant governor.

== Republican primary ==
=== Candidates ===
==== Nominee ====
- Caroleene Dobson, real estate attorney and nominee for Alabama's 2nd congressional district in 2024

==== Eliminated in primary ====
- Christian Horn, candidate for secretary of state in 2022 and Alabama's 7th congressional district in 2024
- Glenda S. Jackson, educator and candidate for Gadsden board of education in 2019

==== Withdrawn ====
- Andrew Sorrell, state auditor (2023–present) (ran for re-election)

==== Declined ====
- Wes Allen, incumbent secretary of state (2023–present) (ran for lieutenant governor)
- Lloyd Peeples, assistant U.S. attorney (ran for state house)

=== Endorsements ===
Caroleene Dobson

Statewide officials

- Will Ainsworth, lieutenant governor of Alabama (2019–present)

Labor unions

- Associated Builders and Contractors of Alabama
- Manufacture Alabama
- Alabama Trucking Association

Organizations

- Alabama Farmers Federation
- Alabama Forestry Association
- Alabama Realtors PAC
- Business Council of Alabama
- Electric Cooperatives of Alabama

=== Fundraising ===
Campaign finance reports as of May 18, 2026
| Candidate | Raised | Other receipts | Spent | Cash on hand |
|---|---|---|---|---|
| Caroleene Dobson (R) | $680,967 | $500,000 | $581,619 | $599,347 |
| Glenda Jackson (R) | $2,227 | $0 | $2,167 | $59 |
Source: Alabama FCPA

=== Polling ===
| Poll source | Date(s) administered | Sample size (Note: Key: A – all adults RV – registered voters LV – likely voters V – unclear) | Margin of error | Caroleene Dobson | Andrew Sorrell | Undecided |
|---|---|---|---|---|---|---|
| | January 5, 2026 | Sorrell withdraws from the race | | | | |
| The Alabama Poll | December 15, 2025 | 600 (LV) | ± 4.0% | 14% | 21% | 64% |
| The Alabama Poll | August 24–26, 2025 | 600 (LV) | ± 4.0% | 16% | 20% | 64% |

=== Results ===
Primary results by county: Dobson: 40–50%; 50–60%; 60–70%; 70–80%; 80–90%; >90%

Republican primary
| Party | Candidate | Votes | % |
|---|---|---|---|
| Republican | Caroleene Dobson | 286,914 | 65.5 |
| Republican | Christopher Christian Horn | 99,108 | 22.6 |
| Republican | Glenda S. Jackson | 52,173 | 11.9 |
| Total votes | | 438,195 | 100.0 |

== Democratic primary ==
=== Candidates ===
==== Nominee ====
- Wayne Rogers, attorney and former chair of the Jefferson County Democratic Party

=== Fundraising ===
Campaign finance reports as of May 18, 2026
| Candidate | Raised | Other receipts | Spent | Cash on hand |
|---|---|---|---|---|
| Wayne Rogers (D) | $28,468 | $1,232 | $16,153 | $13,546 |
Source: Alabama FCPA

== General election ==
=== Predictions ===
| Source | Ranking | As of |
|---|---|---|
| Sabato's Crystal Ball | Safe R | August 7, 2025 |

=== Post-primary endorsements ===
Wayne Rogers (D)

Labor unions

- United Mine Workers of America COMPAC

Organizations

- Alabama AFL-CIO

=== Fundraising ===
Campaign finance reports as of November 2, 2026
| Candidate | Raised | Other receipts | Spent | Cash on hand |
|---|---|---|---|---|
| Caroleene Dobson (R) | $778,251 | $500,000 | $742,254 | $535,996 |
| Wayne Rogers (D) | $53,431 | $1,332 | $49,426 | $5,336 |
Source: Alabama FCPA

=== Polling ===
| Poll source | Date(s) administered | Sample size | Margin of error | Caroleene Dobson (R) | Wayne Rogers (D) | Undecided |
|---|---|---|---|---|---|---|
| Cygnal (R) (Note: Poll conducted for Alabama Daily News and Gray Media Alabama) | October 16–17, 2026 | 500 (LV) | ± 4.4% | 50% | 34% | 16% |

=== Results ===
2026 Alabama Secretary of State election
| Party | Candidate | Votes | % |
|---|---|---|---|
| Republican | Caroleene Dobson | 908,979 | 54.54 |
| Democratic | Wayne Rogers | 756,411 | 45.39 |
| Write-in | | 1,257 | 0.08 |
| Total votes | | 1,666,647 | 100.00 |
| Republican hold | | | |
