= Jeremy Gray =

Jeremy Gray may refer to:

- Jeremy Gray (mathematician)
- Jeremy Gray (politician)
