= Kerry Underwood =

American politician

Bubba Underwood

Member of the Alabama House of Representatives from the 3rd district
- Incumbent
- Assumed office November 9, 2022
- Preceded by: Andrew Sorrell

Personal details
- Born: Sheffield, Alabama, U.S.
- Party: Republican
- Spouse: Anna
- Education: bachelor's degree
- Alma mater: University of North Alabama
- Profession: Accountant

Kerry "Bubba" Underwood is an American politician who has served as a Republican member of the Alabama House of Representatives since November 8, 2022. He represents Alabama's 3rd House district.

== Electoral history ==
He was elected on November 8, 2022, in the 2022 Alabama House of Representatives election against Democratic opponent Wesley Thompson. He assumed office the next day on November 9, 2022. He also served as mayor of Tuscumbia, Alabama.

== Biography ==
Underwood earned a bachelor's degree from the University of North Alabama in 1990. He is a Southern Baptist. He has a son, and three step-daughters.

Alabama House of Representatives
Preceded by Andrew Sorrell	Member of the Alabama House of Representatives; 2022–present	Succeeded by incumbent
