= 2024 United States House of Representatives elections in Alabama =

- November 5, 2024

All 7 Alabama seats to the United States House of Representatives
	Majority party	Minority party
Party	Republican	Democratic
Last election	6	1
Seats won	5	2
Seat change	▼1	▲1
Popular vote	1,508,610	517,881
Percentage	73.66%	25.29%
Swing	▲3.53%	▲1.58%

Republican hold
Democratic hold Democratic gain
Republican
50–60%
60–70%
70–80%
80–90%
>90%
Democratic
50–60%
60–70%
70–80%
80–90%

The 2024 United States House of Representatives elections in Alabama were held on November 5, 2024, to elect the seven U.S. representatives from the state of Alabama, one from each of the state's seven congressional districts. The elections coincided with the 2024 U.S. presidential election, as well as other elections to the House of Representatives, elections to the United States Senate, and various state and local elections.

Candidate qualifying for both major parties ended on November 10, 2023. Primary elections were held on March 5, 2024, as Alabama was a Super Tuesday state in the presidential election calendar. In races where no candidate received over 50% in a primary, runoff elections occurred on April 16, 2024; this occurred in both the Democratic and Republican primaries in Alabama's 2nd congressional district.

== Background ==
=== Allen v. Milligan ===
During the 2020 redistricting cycle, Alabama's congressional map faced legal challenges for alleged violations of the Voting Rights Act of 1965. 27% of Alabama's population is African American, but only one of Alabama's seven districts was drawn with a Black majority. A federal panel initially blocked the 2022 map, finding that the state illegally discriminated against Black voters by not drawing a second majority-Black district. However, on February 7, 2022, the Supreme Court of the United States granted a stay on the case that had been requested by the state of Alabama, allowing the map to remain in place for the 2022 elections, but signaled it would fully review the case at a later date.

On June 8, 2023, the Supreme Court affirmed the previous finding that the map discriminated against Black Alabamians. In a 5–4 decision in Allen v. Milligan, Justice Brett Kavanaugh and Chief Justice John Roberts joined the Supreme Court's liberal wing (Justices Ketanji Brown Jackson, Elena Kagan, and Sonia Sotomayor) and ruled in favor of Milligan. The decision, considered an unexpected victory for voting rights activists in Alabama, upheld the federal panel's ruling that Alabama had illegally diluted the power of Black voters. The decision forced Alabama to reconfigure its congressional districts in advance of the 2024 elections, including drawing a second predominantly Black district. The Alabama Legislature was required to convene a special legislative session in order to draw a new map. John Wahl, chair of the Alabama Republican Party, published a statement in reaction to the ruling, stating that the party would "work hard to win all seven congressional seats".

=== Redistricting process ===
The new congressional districts map chosen by the trial court Interactive map version

A special session of the Alabama Legislature was called to approve a new congressional map in July 2023, with a deadline of July 21. The Alabama House of Representatives and Alabama Senate passed two different congressional maps separately, neither of which included a second majority-minority district. The Alabama House of Representatives passed a map proposed by Republican Representative Chris Pringle that increased the Black voting age population in Alabama's 2nd congressional district to 42%, but still below the majority-minority threshold. The Alabama Senate passed a map proposed by Republican Senator Steve Livingston that increased it to only 38%. A special conference committee consisting of six members from both wings of the Alabama Legislature passed a new map with additional changes on July 21. The new congressional map was signed into law by Governor Kay Ivey the same day. In the legislature's map, the Black voting age population in Alabama's 7th congressional district was reduced from 55.6% to 50.6%, while Alabama's 2nd congressional district's Black voting age population was increased to 39.9%.

The map enacted by the state was struck down on September 5, confirming speculation by Black lawmakers in the state that it failed to comply with the requirement for a second majority Black district. The panel of judges ruling on the maps wrote that they were "deeply troubled that the State enacted a map that the State readily admits does not provide the remedy we said federal law requires". The judges appointed a special master, Richard Allen (no relation to Wes Allen or Allen v. Milligan), to take control of the mapmaking process following Alabama lawmakers' defiance. Three proposed maps from the special master were released on September 25. In all of the maps, Coffee County, which was represented by and home to Barry Moore, was moved to Alabama's 1st congressional district, which set up a primary in which Jerry Carl and Moore were both incumbents pitted against each other.

=== Finalization of special master map ===
The state of Alabama, under Attorney General of Alabama Steve Marshall, requested a stay on the federal panel's decision to not allow the legislature's new map. On September 26, 2023, the Supreme Court again denied Alabama's request, meaning that the special master's map was to be used in the 2024 elections. All three of the proposed remedial maps raised the Black voting-age population in the second congressional district in ranges from 48.5% to 50.1%. The Alabama Democratic Conference, the Black caucus of the Alabama Democratic Party, also announced the same day that it planned to file an objection to the special master's maps, saying that they did not go far enough to create a majority-minority district. The conference offered its own redistricting map in the objection, but it was denied by the federal panel.

Following another hearing on the case, the federal panel issued an opinion on October 5, 2023, ordering Alabama to implement the congressional map known as Remedial Plan 3, as drawn by the special master. Secretary of State of Alabama Wes Allen said his office would implement the new map for the 2024 elections. In Remedial Plan 3, Alabama's 2nd congressional district has a Black voting-age population of 48.7%, and a Black-preferred candidate was found to have won in 16 of 17 simulated elections.

== Overview ==
Demographic map of the districts

Republicans won five districts, while Democrats won two: the newly created second one and the existing seventh one. Both those districts are plurality Black, whereas the ones by Republicans are predominantly white. Such a correlation is consistent with a preference towards Democrats among Alabama's Black voters. Democrats fielded their candidates in four districts out of seven, with Republicans securing almost unchallenged victories in the third, fourth and fifth districts. Outside of those, Republicans earned their best result in the first district, with 78.4% of the vote.

Republicans improved on their 2022 result, earning 3.5% of the vote more. However, this election became the first since 2008 when Democrats held more than a single seat in Alabama. Furthermore, this marked the first time when two Black Representatives were simultaneously elected from the state.

District	Rep., #	Rep., %	Dem., #	Dem., %	Elected
1st	258,619	78.4%	70,929	21.5%	Barry Moore
2nd	131,414	45.4%	158,041	54.6%	Shomari Figures
3rd	243,848	97.9%	N/A	N/A	Mike Rogers
4th	274,498	98.8%	N/A	N/A	Robert Aderholt
5th	250,322	95.4%	N/A	N/A	Dale Strong
6th	243,741	70.3%	102,504	29.6%	Gary Palmer
7th	106,168	36.3%	186,407	63.7%	Terri Sewell

== District 1 ==
2024 Alabama's 1st congressional district election
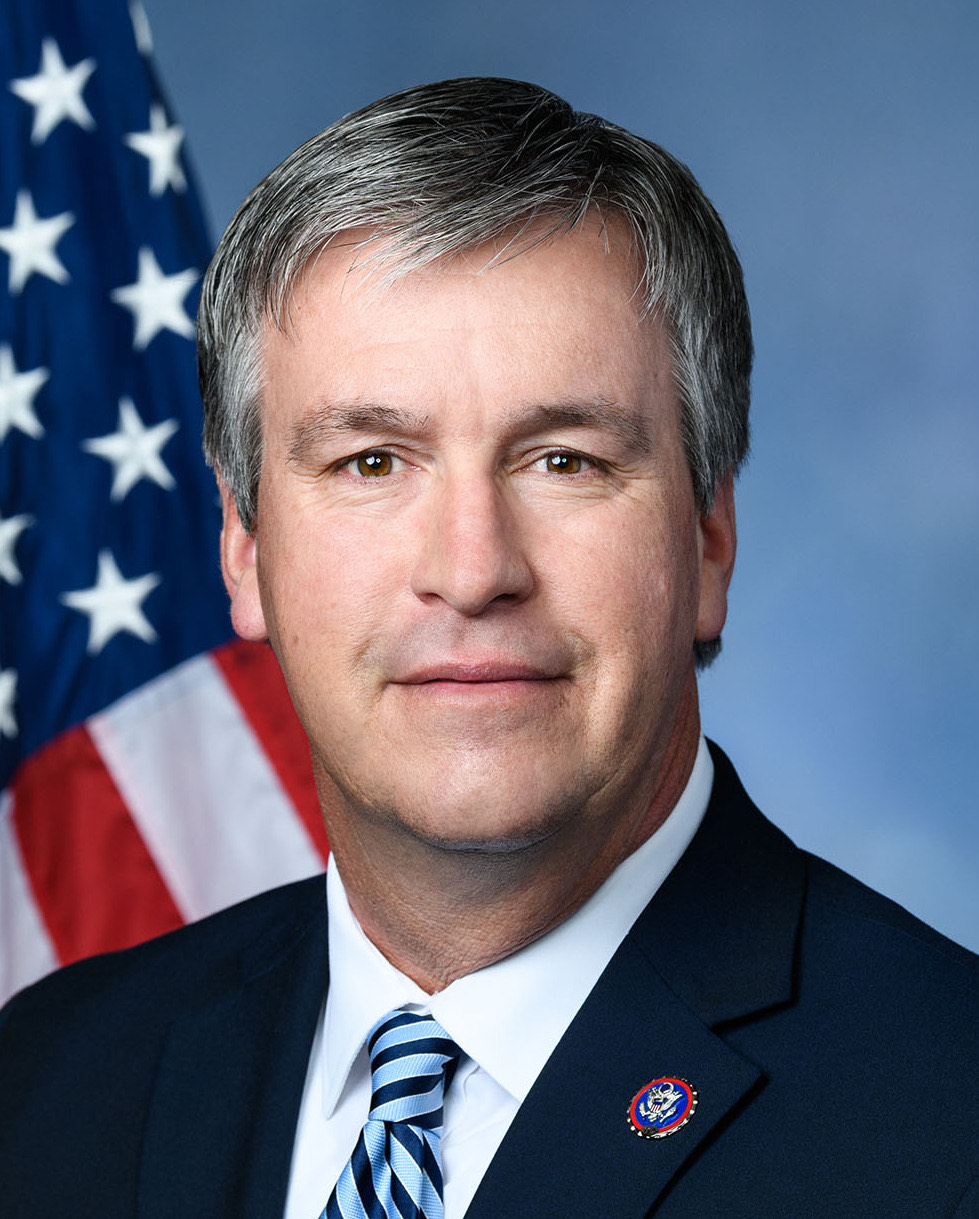

Nominee	Barry Moore	Tom Holmes
Party	Republican	Democratic
Popular vote	258,619	70,929
Percentage	78.4%	21.5%
- Moore: 50–60% 60–70% 70–80% 80–90% >90% Holmes: 50–60% 60–70% 80–90% >90% No votes
U.S. Representative before election
Jerry Carl (Republican)
Barry Moore (Republican)
Elected U.S. Representative
Barry Moore
Republican

Under the new congressional map, the 1st congressional district encompasses the southernmost parts of the state, including all of Baldwin, Coffee, Covington, Dale, and Escambia counties, including the cities of Bay Minette, Daphne, Enterprise and Ozark. It also includes whiter parts of Mobile County and the city of Mobile. Incumbent Republican Jerry Carl had been re-elected with 84.2% of the vote in 2022 against a Libertarian candidate.

Following redistricting, 2nd district incumbent Barry Moore was placed into the 1st district as well, setting up a primary between Moore and Carl, both incumbents. On October 30, 2023, Moore confirmed to 1819 News that he would run in the first congressional district, challenging Carl in the Republican primary.

=== Republican primary ===
==== Nominee ====
- Barry Moore, incumbent U.S. representative

==== Eliminated in primary ====
- Jerry Carl, incumbent U.S. representative

==== Endorsements ====
Jerry Carl

State legislators

- Greg Albritton, state senator from the 22nd district (Atmore, 2014–present) and candidate for the 2nd district
- Chris Elliott, state senator from the 32nd district (Josephine, 2018–present)
- David Sessions, state senator from the 35th district (Grand Bay, 2018–present)
- Jack Williams, state senator from the 34th district (Mobile, 2018–present)
- Chris Pringle, Speaker pro tempore of the Alabama House of Representatives (2023–present) and state representative from the 101st district (Mobile, 1994–2002, 2014–present)
- 10 additional state representatives

County officials

- 4 county sheriffs
- 10 county commissioners

Local officials

- Sandy Stimpson, mayor of Mobile
- 21 other mayors

Organizations

- AIPAC (co-endorsement with Moore)
- Associated General Contractors of America PAC
Barry Moore

U.S. senators

- Ted Cruz, U.S. senator from Texas (2013–present)

U.S. representatives

- Andy Biggs, U.S. representative for Arizona's 5th congressional district (2017–present)
- Eli Crane, U.S. representative for Arizona's 2nd congressional district (2023–present)
- Warren Davidson, U.S. representative for Ohio's 8th congressional district (2016–present)
- Marjorie Taylor Greene, U.S. representative for Georgia's 14th congressional district (2021–2026)
- Jim Jordan, U.S. representative for Ohio's 4th congressional district (2007–present)
- Troy Nehls, U.S. representative for Texas's 22nd congressional district (2021–present)

State legislators

- Bill Hightower, former state senator from the 35th district (Mobile, 2013–2018)

Organizations

- AIPAC (co-endorsement with Carl)
- Alabama Republican Assembly
- Club for Growth
- Eagle Forum
- House Freedom Fund

==== Fundraising ====
Campaign finance reports as of June 30, 2024
Candidate	Raised	Spent	Cash on hand
Jerry Carl (R)	$2,204,868	$2,586,226	$72,539
Barry Moore (R)	$969,981	$1,314,556	$118,222
Source: Federal Election Commission

==== Debates and forums ====
2024 AL-1 Republican primary debates and forums
No.	Date	Location	Host	Moderator	Link	Participants	
P Participant A Absent I Invited							
P Participant A Absent I Invited						Carl	Moore
1	January 15, 2024	Mobile	Mobile County Republican Party	None (forum)	N/A	P	P
2	January 24, 2024	Daphne	Baldwin County Republican Party	Peter Albrecht; Jeff Poor; Sean Sullivan	Facebook	P	P
3	February 8, 2024	Fairhope	Eastern Shore Republican Women	None (forum)	N/A	P	P
4	February 19, 2024	Orange Beach	Baldwin County Conservative Coalition	Robert Monk	N/A	P	P
5	February 21, 2024	Enterprise	Republican Women of Coffee County	Sheridan Smith	Facebook	P	P

==== Polling ====
Poll source	Date(s) administered	Sample size (Note: Key: A – all adults RV – registered voters LV – likely voters V – unclear)	Margin of error	Jerry Carl	Barry Moore	Undecided
Auburn University	February 27, 2024	1,909 (LV)	± 2.2%	43%	35%	22%
Montgomery Research	January 2024	697 (V)	± 3.4%	37%	41%	22%

==== Results ====
Moore won the six counties in the eastern part of the district, recording his best performance in his home Coffee County. Meanwhile, Carl won Escambia and Baldwin counties, as well as his home Mobile County.

Results by county: Moore—80–90% Moore—70–80% Moore—60–70% Carl—60–70% Carl—70–80%

Republican primary results
Party	Candidate	Votes	%
Republican	Barry Moore (incumbent)	53,956	51.7
Republican	Jerry Carl (incumbent)	50,312	48.3
Total votes		104,268	100.0

=== Democratic primary ===
==== Nominee ====
- Tom Holmes, nonprofit executive

==== Fundraising ====
Campaign finance reports as of June 30, 2024
Candidate	Raised	Spent	Cash on hand
Tom Holmes (D)	$8,469	$5,968	$2,001
Source: Federal Election Commission

=== General election ===
==== Predictions ====
Source	Ranking	As of
The Cook Political Report	Solid R	October 20, 2023
Inside Elections	Solid R	October 20, 2023
Sabato's Crystal Ball	Safe R	October 4, 2023
Elections Daily	Safe R	October 5, 2023
CNalysis	Solid R	November 16, 2023
Decision Desk HQ	Safe R	October 22, 2024

==== Fundraising ====
Campaign finance reports as of June 30, 2024
Candidate	Raised	Spent	Cash on hand
Barry Moore (R)	$969,981	$1,314,556	$118,222
Tom Holmes (D)	$8,469	$5,968	$2,001
Source: Federal Election Commission

==== Results ====
2024 Alabama's 1st congressional district election
Party	Candidate	Votes	%
Republican	Barry Moore (incumbent)	258,619	78.4
Democratic	Tom Holmes	70,929	21.5
Write-in		306	0.1
Total votes		329,854	100.0
Republican hold			

==== By county ====
County	Barry Moore Republican		Tom Holmes Democratic		Write-in Various		Margin		Total
County	#	%	#	%	#	%	#	%	Total
Baldwin	96,762	80.04%	24,011	19.86%	119	0.10%	72,751	60.18%	120,892
Coffee	17,668	79.81%	4,446	20.08%	23	0.10%	13,222	59.73%	22,137
Covington	14,504	86.11%	2,335	13.86%	4	0.02%	12,169	72.25%	16,843
Dale	14,546	76.77%	4,384	23.14%	17	0.09%	10,162	53.63%	18,947
Escambia	10,755	73.31%	3,904	26.61%	11	0.07%	6,851	46.70%	14,670
Geneva	10,917	88.80%	1,373	11.17%	4	0.03%	9,544	77.63%	12,294
Henry	7,061	76.75%	2,134	23.20%	5	0.05%	4,927	53.55%	9,200
Houston	32,974	74.96%	10,963	24.92%	50	0.11%	22,011	50.04%	43,987
Mobile (part)	53,432	75.38%	17,379	24.52%	73	0.10%	36,053	50.86%	70,884
Totals	258,619	78.40%	70,929	21.50%	306	0.09%	187,690	56.90%	329,854

== District 2 ==
2024 Alabama's 2nd congressional district election
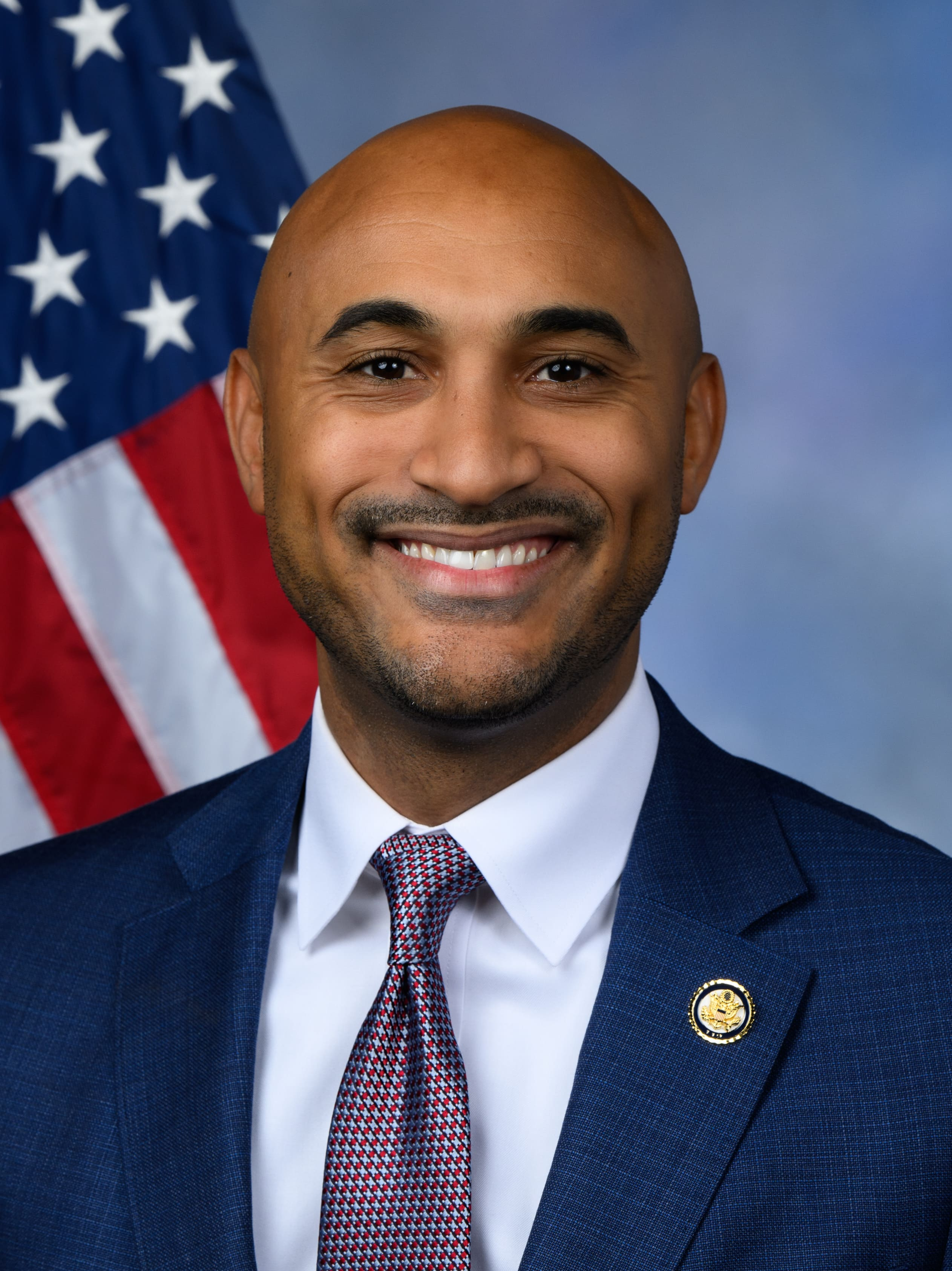

Nominee	Shomari Figures	Caroleene Dobson
Party	Democratic	Republican
Popular vote	158,041	131,414
Percentage	54.6%	45.4%
- Figures: 50–60% 60–70% 70–80% 80–90% >90% Dobson: 50–60% 60–70% 70–80% 80–90% >90% Tie: 50%
U.S. Representative before election
None
(New seat)
Elected U.S. Representative
Shomari Figures
Democratic

In the new congressional map, the 2nd district encompasses all of Montgomery County and the capital city of Montgomery, as well as majority Black sections of the Wiregrass Region and the city of Mobile. It also includes the entirety of Butler, Macon, Monroe, Pike, and Russell counties, including the cities of Greenville, Monroeville, Troy, and Tuskegee. The district is currently represented by Republican Barry Moore, who was re-elected with 69.12% of the vote in 2022; however, Moore's home county of Coffee was drawn out of the 2nd district and into the first. This left the district with no incumbent, as Moore instead chose to run in the 1st district.

=== Republican primary ===
==== Nominee ====
- Caroleene Dobson, real estate attorney

==== Eliminated in runoff ====
- Dick Brewbaker, former state senator from the 25th district (2010–2018)

==== Eliminated in primary ====
- Greg Albritton, state senator from the 22nd district (2014–present)
- Karla DuPriest, restaurant owner, former Mobile County Absentee Ballot Manager, and candidate for U.S. Senate in 2022
- Hampton Harris, real estate broker
- Stacey Shepperson, college instructor
- Belinda Thomas, Newton town councilor and Alabama Republican Party outreach coalition director

==== Withdrew ====
- Wallace Gilberry, former professional football player for the New York Giants (endorsed Brewbaker)

==== Declined ====
- Wes Allen, Alabama Secretary of State (2023–present)
- Barry Moore, incumbent U.S. Representative (ran in the 1st district)
- Gordon Stone, mayor of Pike Road (2004–present)

==== Endorsements ====
Dick Brewbaker

Executive branch officials

- Michael Flynn, 24th United States National Security Advisor (2017)

State legislators

- Perry Hooper Jr., former state representative from the 73rd district (1984–2003) and co-chair of the Donald Trump 2016 presidential campaign in Alabama

Individuals

- Wallace Gilberry, former professional football player and withdrawn candidate for this seat

Organizations

- Eagle Forum
Caroleene Dobson

Organizations

- Maggie's List
- National Cattlemen's Beef Association
- Texas and Southwestern Cattle Raisers Association

==== Fundraising ====
Campaign finance reports as of June 30, 2024
Candidate	Raised	Spent	Cash on hand
Greg Albritton (R)	$187,965	$187,965	$0
Dick Brewbaker (R)	$2,129,338	$2,129,219	$119
Caroleene Dobson (R)	$2,218,688	$1,746,874	$471,813
Wallace Gilberry (R) (withdrew)	$165,335	$165,335	$0
Hampton Harris (R)	$58,137	$56,310	$1,827
Source: Federal Election Commission

==== Debates and forums ====
2024 AL-2 Republican primary debates and forums
No.	Date and location	Host	Moderator	Link	Participants						
P Participant A Absent I Invited W Withdrawn											
P Participant A Absent I Invited W Withdrawn					Albritton	Brewbaker	Dobson	DuPriest	Harris	Shepperson	Thomas
1	January 9, 2024; Prichard	United Alliance for Change	Kym Anderson	N/A	A	A	A	P	A	P	A
2	January 15, 2024; Mobile	Mobile County Republican Party	None (forum)	N/A	P	P	P	P	P	P	P
3	January 29, 2024; Greenville	Butler County Republican Party	Cliff Burkette	N/A	P	P	P	A	A	A	A
4	February 15, 2024; Montgomery	Montgomery County Republican Party; Capital City Young Republicans	None (forum)	N/A	P	P	P	A	P	A	P
5	February 25, 2024; Montgomery	Alabama Republican Party; Gray Television	Mark Bullock; Lenise Ligon	WSFA-12	P	P	P	P	P	A	P
6	February 29, 2024; Mobile	Mobile United	Kesshia Davis; Janelle Adams	Facebook	A	P	A	A	A	P	A

==== Polling ====
Poll source	Date(s) administered	Sample size	Margin of error	Greg Albritton	Dick Brewbaker	Caroleene Dobson	Wallace Gilberry	Undecided
	January 9, 2023	Gilberry withdraws from the race						
McLaughlin & Associates (R)	December 5–7, 2023	300 (LV)	± ?	12%	24%	5%	5%	54%

==== Results ====
Results by county: Brewbaker–30–40% Brewbaker–40–50% Brewbaker–60–70% Dobson–40–50% Albritton–30–40% Albritton–50–60% Albritton–60–70%

Republican primary results
Party	Candidate	Votes	%
Republican	Dick Brewbaker	22,589	39.6
Republican	Caroleene Dobson	15,102	26.5
Republican	Greg Albritton	14,470	25.3
Republican	Hampton Harris	1,414	2.5
Republican	Belinda Thomas	1,082	1.9
Republican	Wallace Gilberry (withdrawn)	838	1.5
Republican	Karla DuPriest	823	1.4
Republican	Stacey Shepperson	773	1.4
Total votes		57,091	100.0

==== Runoff ====
===== Endorsements =====
Dick Brewbaker

Statewide officials

- Ken Paxton, Texas Attorney General (2015–present)

State legislators

- Will Barfoot, state senator from the 25th district (Pike Road, 2018–present)
- Reed Ingram, state representative from the 75th district (Pike Road, 2014–present)
Caroleene Dobson

State legislators

- David Sessions, state senator from the 35th district (Grand Bay, 2018–present)
- Jack Williams, state senator from the 34th district (Mobile, 2018–present)

Organizations

- Maggie's List

==== Fundraising ====
Campaign finance reports as of June 30, 2024
Candidate	Raised	Spent	Cash on hand
Dick Brewbaker (R)	$2,129,338	$2,129,219	$119
Caroleene Dobson (R)	$2,218,688	$1,746,874	$471,813
Source: Federal Election Commission

===== Results =====
Results by county: Brewbaker–50–60% Brewbaker–60–70% Dobson–50–60% Dobson–60–70% Dobson–70–80% Dobson–80–90%

Republican primary runoff results
Party	Candidate	Votes	%
Republican	Caroleene Dobson	14,705	58.4
Republican	Dick Brewbaker	10,471	41.6
Total votes		25,176	100.0

=== Democratic primary ===
==== Nominee ====
- Shomari Figures, former deputy chief of staff and counsel to U.S. Attorney General Merrick Garland and son of state senators Vivian Davis Figures and Michael Figures

==== Eliminated in runoff ====
- Anthony Daniels, minority leader of the Alabama House of Representatives (2017–present) from the 53rd district (2014–present)

==== Eliminated in primary ====
- James Averhart, U.S. Marine Corps veteran and nominee for the 1st district in 2020
- Napoleon Bracy Jr., state representative from the 98th district (2010–present) (endorsed Figures in runoff)
- Merika Coleman, state senator from the 19th district (2022–present) (endorsed Daniels in runoff)
- Juandalynn Givan, state representative from the 60th district (2010–present) (endorsed Figures in runoff)
- Jeremy Gray, state representative from the 83rd district (2018–present) (endorsed Figures in runoff)
- Phyllis Harvey-Hall, education consultant, retired teacher, and nominee for this district in 2020 and 2022
- Willie Lenard, management consultant
- Vimal Patel, real estate broker and candidate for this district in 2022
- Larry Darnell Simpson, band manager and musician

==== Withdrew ====
- Brian Gary, surgeon
- Kirk Hatcher, state senator from the 26th district (2021–present) (endorsed Figures)
- Darryl Sinkfield, assistant executive director for field services with the Alabama Education Association

==== Declined ====
- Steven Reed, mayor of Montgomery (2019–present) (endorsed Hatcher, then Gary, then Sinkfield)
- Quinton Ross, president of Alabama State University and former minority leader of the Alabama Senate (2014–2017) from the 26th district (2002–2017)

==== Endorsements ====
Anthony Daniels

Labor unions

- Communications Workers of America
- International Brotherhood of Electrical Workers Local 443
- Professional Fire Fighters of Alabama
Napoleon Bracy Jr. (eliminated)

Organizations

- Alabama Democratic Conference
Darryl Sinkfield (withdrawn)

Local officials

- Steven Reed, mayor of Montgomery (2019–present) (previously endorsed Hatcher, then Gary)
Brian Gary (withdrawn)

Local officials

- ~~Steven Reed, mayor of Montgomery (2019–present)~~ (switched endorsement to Sinkfield)
Kirk Hatcher (withdrawn)

Local officials

- ~~Steven Reed, mayor of Montgomery (2019–present)~~ (switched endorsement to Gary, then Sinkfield)

==== Fundraising ====
Campaign finance reports as of June 30, 2024
Candidate	Raised	Spent	Cash on hand
James Averhart (D)	$8,876	$6,240	$2,757
Napoleon Bracy Jr. (D)	$201,092	$196,476	$4,615
Merika Coleman (D)	$142,030	$110,017	$32,013
Anthony Daniels (D)	$567,548	$554,083	$13,464
Shomari Figures (D)	$894,272	$592,324	$301,948
Juandalynn Givan (D)	$150,251	$126,936	$23,314
Jeremy Gray (D)	$161,092	$160,830	$262
Phyllis Harvey-Hall (D)	$16,284	$5,610	$10,894
Willie Lenard (D)	$53,721	$51,681	$2,039
Vimal Patel (D)	$16,300	$11,218	$0
Source: Federal Election Commission

==== Debates and forums ====
2024 AL-2 Democratic primary debates and forums
No.	Date and location	Host	Moderator	Link	Participants									
P Participant A Absent I Invited W Withdrawn														
P Participant A Absent I Invited W Withdrawn					Averhart	Bracy Jr.	Coleman	Daniels	Figures	Givan	Gray	Harvey-Hall	Lenard	Petal
1	January 9, 2024; Prichard	United Alliance for Change	Kym Anderson	N/A	P	P	P	P	P	P	P	P	A	A
2	January 25, 2024; Montgomery	Rollin to the Polls	Unknown	Facebook	P	P	P	P	P	A	P	P	P	P
3	February 20, 2024; Montgomery	Southern Poverty Law; Center Action Fund	Tafeni English-Relf	Vimeo	A	P	P	A	P	P	P	A	A	A
4	February 22, 2024; Montgomery	Montgomery Metro; Ministers Union	Valorie Lawson	Facebook	A	P	P	P	P	P	P	P	P	A
5	February 25, 2024; Montgomery	Alabama Democratic Party; Gray Television	Mark Bullock; Lenise Ligon	WSFA-12	A	P	P	P	P	A	P	A	A	A
6	February 29, 2024; Mobile	Mobile United	Kesshia Davis; Janelle Adams	Facebook	A	A (Note: According to the event organizers, Bracy was disqualified from participating due to a failure to RSVP for the forum. Bracy attended as a spectator in the audience.)	A	P	P	P	P	P	P	A
7	March 3, 2024; Selma	Transform Alabama	Mark A. Thompson	N/A	P	A	A	A	A	P	P	A	P	A

==== Polling ====
Poll source	Date(s) administered	Sample size	Margin of error	James Averhart	Napoleon Bracy Jr.	Merika Coleman	Anthony Daniels	Shomari Figures	Juandalynn Givan	Jeremy Gray	Darryl Sinkfield	Others	Undecided
Lester & Associates (Note: Poll sponsored by Figures's campaign)	January 19–24, 2024	400 (LV)	± 4.0%	4%	16%	6%	8%	13%	1%	3%	–	–	49%
	December 21, 2023	Sinkfield withdraws from the race											
Impact Research (D) (Note: Poll sponsored by the Southern Poverty Law Center Action Fund, which supports Democratic candidates)	December 16–20, 2023	400 (LV)	?	–	15%	6%	8%	9%	2%	4%	5%	4%	47%

==== Results ====
Figures won eight counties, performing best in the two westernmost counties of the district: Mobile and Washington. Daniels won four counties in the eastern part, securing his best result in Bullock County, where he graduated from high school. Bracy likewise performed well in the western portion of the district, carrying Clarke County.

Results by county: Figures–30–40% Figures–40–50% Figures–60–70% Daniels–30–40% Daniels–40–50% Daniels–50–60% Daniels–80–90% Bracy–40–50%

Democratic primary results
Party	Candidate	Votes	%
Democratic	Shomari Figures	24,980	43.4
Democratic	Anthony Daniels	12,879	22.4
Democratic	Napoleon Bracy Jr.	9,010	15.7
Democratic	Merika Coleman	3,445	6.0
Democratic	Phyllis Harvey-Hall	2,007	3.5
Democratic	James Averhart	1,623	2.8
Democratic	Jeremy Gray	1,580	2.7
Democratic	Juandalynn Givan	1,261	2.2
Democratic	Vimal Patel	289	0.5
Democratic	Larry Darnell Simpson	247	0.4
Democratic	Willie Lenard	199	0.3
Total votes		57,520	100.0

==== Runoff ====
===== Endorsements =====
Anthony Daniels

State legislators

- Merika Coleman, state senator from the 19th district (2022–present)
- Phillip Ensler, state representative from the 74th district (2022–present)
- Berry Forte, state representative from the 84th district (2010–present)
- Kenyatté Hassell, state representative from the 78th district (2021–present)
- Kelvin Lawrence, state representative from the 69th district (2014–present)
- Patrice McClammy, state representative from the 76th district (2021–present)
- Tashina Morris, state representative from the 77th district (2018–present)
- Curtis Travis, state representative from the 72nd district (2022–present)

Local officials

- Johnny Ford, former mayor of Tuskegee (1972–1996, 2004–2008, 2012–2016)
Shomari Figures

State legislators

- Napoleon Bracy Jr., state representative from the 98th district (2010–present)
- Adline Clarke, state representative from the 97th district (2013–present)
- Juandalynn Givan, state representative from the 60th district (2010–present)
- Jeremy Gray, state representative from the 83rd district (2018–present)
- Kirk Hatcher, state senator from the 26th district (2021–present)

Individuals

- Joe Reed, chair of the Alabama Democratic Conference and father of Montgomery mayor Steven Reed

Organizations

- Alabama Democratic Conference (previously endorsed Bracy)
- College Democrats of America
- Planned Parenthood Action Fund

Labor unions

- International Brotherhood of Teamsters

==== Fundraising ====
Campaign finance reports as of June 30, 2024
Candidate	Raised	Spent	Cash on hand
Anthony Daniels (D)	$567,548	$554,083	$13,464
Shomari Figures (D)	$894,272	$592,324	$301,948
Source: Federal Election Commission

==== Polling ====
Poll source	Date(s) administered	Sample size	Margin of error	Anthony Daniels	Shomari Figures	Undecided
Impact Research	March 14–18, 2024	500 (LV)	± 4.4%	24%	59%	17%

===== Results =====
Results by county: Figures–50–60% Figures–60–70% Figures–70–80% Figures–80–90% Figures–>90% Daniels–50–60% Daniels–60–70% Daniels–70–80% Daniels–>90%

Democratic primary runoff results
Party	Candidate	Votes	%
Democratic	Shomari Figures	21,926	61.0
Democratic	Anthony Daniels	13,990	39.0
Total votes		35,916	100.0

=== General election ===
==== Predictions ====
Source	Ranking	As of
The Cook Political Report	Likely D (flip)	October 20, 2023
Inside Elections	Likely D (flip)	October 20, 2023
Sabato's Crystal Ball	Likely D (flip)	October 4, 2023
Elections Daily	Safe D (flip)	October 10, 2024
CNalysis	Solid D (flip)	November 16, 2023
Decision Desk HQ	Lean D (flip)	October 27, 2024

==== Post-primary endorsements ====
Shomari Figures (D)

Federal officials

- Barack Obama, 44th President of the United States (2009–2017), U.S. Senator from Illinois (2005–2008)
- Hakeem Jeffries, NY-08 (2013–present), House Minority Leader (2023–present)
- Terri Sewell, AL-07 (2011–present)
- Eric Holder, U.S. Attorney General (acting 2001, 2009–2015) U.S. Deputy Attorney General (1997–2001) U.S. Attorney for the District of Columbia (1993–1997), Judge of the Superior Court of the District of Columbia (1988–1993)

State legislators

- Adrian Boafo, Maryland state delegate from the 23rd district (2023–present)
- Anthony Daniels, minority leader of the Alabama House of Representatives (2017–present) from the 53rd district (2014–present)

Organizations

- Democratic Majority for Israel
- Everytown for Gun Safety
- Southern Poverty Law Center
Caroleene Dobson (R)

Statewide officials

- Kay Ivey, Governor of Alabama (2017–present)

==== Debates and forums ====
2024 Alabama's 2nd congressional district general election debates and forums
No.	Date	Host	Moderator	Link	Participants	
P Participant A Absent N Non-invitee I Invitee W Withdrawn						
P Participant A Absent N Non-invitee I Invitee W Withdrawn					Figures	Dobson
1	October 2, 2024	WSFA-TV, Montgomery Area Chamber of Commerce	Martha Roby	C-SPAN	P	P
2	October 10, 2024	AL.com, AARP	Ivana Hrynkiw	C-SPAN	P	P
3	October 25, 2024	Mobile Chamber of Congress, FOX 10 News	Sarah Wall, Cameron Taylor	YouTube	P	P

==== Polling ====
Poll source	Date(s) administered	Sample size	Margin of error	Shomari Figures (D)	Caroleene Dobson (R)	Undecided
Montgomery Research	October 22, 2024	994 (RV)	± 3.1%	50%	46%	4%
Schoen Cooperman Research (D) (Note: Poll sponsored by the Protect Progress PAC)	October 14–17, 2024	400 (LV)	± 5.0%	49%	38%	14%
Schoen Cooperman Research (D)	September 3–8, 2024	400 (LV)	± 5.0%	49%	38%	14%
Impact Research (D)	July 28 – August 3, 2024	400 (LV)	± 5.0%	51%	39%	10%
Strategy Management (R) (Note: Poll sponsored by Alabama Families PAC, which is a sponsor of Republican candidates.)	July 22–24, 2024	1,000 (RV)	± 4.0%	37%	34%	29%

==== Results ====
2024 Alabama's 2nd congressional district election
Party	Candidate	Votes	%
Democratic	Shomari Figures	158,041	54.6
Republican	Caroleene Dobson	131,414	45.4
Write-in		219	0.1
Total votes		289,674	100.0
Democratic win (new seat)			

==== By county ====
County	Shomari Figures Democratic		Caroleene Dobson Republican		Write-in Various		Margin		Total
County	#	%	#	%	#	%	#	%	Total
Barbour	4,119	42.35%	5,601	57.58%	7	0.07%	-1,482	-15.24%	9,727
Bullock	2,996	73.06%	1,105	26.94%	0	0.00%	1,891	46.11%	4,101
Butler	3,301	39.14%	5,127	60.79%	6	0.07%	-1,826	-21.65%	8,434
Clarke (part)	1,765	66.55%	885	33.37%	2	0.08%	880	33.18%	2,652
Conecuh	2,630	44.08%	3,331	55.82%	6	0.10%	-701	-11.75%	5,967
Crenshaw	1,488	23.06%	4,962	76.88%	4	0.06%	-3,474	-53.83%	6,454
Macon	6,134	78.63%	1,663	21.32%	4	0.05%	4,471	57.31%	7,801
Mobile (part)	55,910	54.19%	47,173	45.73%	82	0.08%	8,737	8.47%	103,165
Monroe	3,772	38.54%	6,011	61.42%	3	0.03%	-2,239	-22.88%	9,786
Montgomery	58,668	65.50%	30,813	34.40%	84	0.09%	27,855	31.10%	89,565
Pike	4,911	37.33%	8,240	62.64%	4	0.03%	-3,329	-25.31%	13,155
Russell	10,397	50.72%	10,085	49.20%	15	0.07%	312	1.52%	20,497
Washington	1,950	23.30%	6,418	76.68%	2	0.02%	-4,468	-53.38%	8,370
Totals	158,041	54.56%	131,414	45.37%	219	0.08%	26,627	9.19%	289,674

== District 3 ==
2024 Alabama's 3rd congressional district election
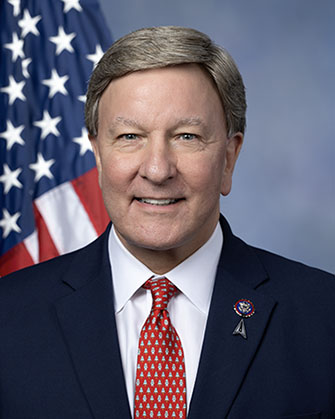
Nominee	Mike Rogers
Party	Republican
Popular vote	243,848
Percentage	97.9%
- Precinct results Rogers: 80–90% >90%
U.S. Representative before election
Mike Rogers
Republican
Elected U.S. Representative
Mike Rogers
Republican

The 3rd district is based in eastern Alabama, taking in Calhoun, Etowah, Lee, and Talladega counties, including the cities of Anniston, Auburn, Gadsden, and Talladega. The incumbent is Republican Mike Rogers, who was re-elected with 71.3% of the vote in 2022.

Rogers has qualified to run for reelection. Rogers faced criticism from conservative colleagues over his initial refusal to support Jim Jordan in the October 2023 Speaker of the United States House of Representatives election, as well as his stated willingness to compromise with House Minority Leader Hakeem Jeffries to elect a different candidate. In response, members of the Alabama Republican Party state executive committee, including members from the 3rd district, threatened to file a challenge against Rogers' ballot access in the 2024 election. On October 16, 2023, Rogers issued a statement endorsing Jordan for Speaker of the House, reversing his position and establishing his support for Jordan.

No Democratic candidates qualified to run in this district, though Rogers faced two unsuccessful primary challengers.

=== Republican primary ===
==== Nominee ====
- Mike Rogers, incumbent U.S. representative

==== Eliminated in primary ====
- Barron Rae Bevels, personal trainer
- Bryan Newell, service technician

==== Declined ====
- Robert McCollum, businessman (ran for Alabama Public Service Commission president)

==== Endorsements ====
Barron Rae Bevels

Organizations

- Alabama Republican Assembly
Mike Rogers

Executive branch officials

- Donald Trump, 45th president of the United States

Organizations

- AIPAC
- Alabama Realtors PAC
- National Rifle Association Political Victory Fund
- Pro-Israel America

==== Fundraising ====
Campaign finance reports as of February 14, 2024
Candidate	Raised	Spent	Cash on hand
Barron Rae Bevels (R) (Note: Did not file for 6 week filing deadline)	$270	$3,816	$479
Bryan Newell (R)	$6,475	$6,057	$172
Mike Rogers (R)	$1,711,825	$1,114,626	$1,625,534
Source: Federal Election Commission

==== Results ====
Republican primary results
Party	Candidate	Votes	%
Republican	Mike Rogers (incumbent)	71,242	81.9
Republican	Bryan Newell	10,926	12.6
Republican	Barron Rae Bevels	4,856	5.6
Total votes		87,024	100.0

=== General election ===
==== Predictions ====
Source	Ranking	As of
The Cook Political Report	Solid R	October 20, 2023
Inside Elections	Solid R	October 20, 2023
Sabato's Crystal Ball	Safe R	October 4, 2023
Elections Daily	Safe R	October 5, 2023
CNalysis	Solid R	November 16, 2023
Decision Desk HQ	Safe R	October 22, 2024

==== Fundraising ====
Campaign finance reports as of March 31, 2024
Candidate	Raised	Spent	Cash on hand
Mike Rogers (R)	$1,932,464	$1,322,441	$1,638,357
Source: Federal Election Commission

==== Results ====
2024 Alabama's 3rd congressional district election
Party	Candidate	Votes	%
Republican	Mike Rogers (incumbent)	243,848	97.9
Write-in		5,160	2.1
Total votes		249,008	100.0
Republican hold			

==== By county ====
County	Mike Rogers Republican		Write-in Various		Margin		Total
County	#	%	#	%	#	%	Total
Calhoun	37,429	97.23%	1,065	2.77%	36,364	94.47%	38,494
Chambers	9,695	97.95%	203	2.05%	9,492	95.90%	9,898
Cherokee	11,435	99.32%	78	0.68%	11,357	98.65%	11,513
Clay	5,830	99.20%	47	0.80%	5,783	98.40%	5,877
Cleburne	6,979	99.40%	42	0.60%	6,937	98.80%	7,021
Etowah	36,720	98.56%	537	1.44%	36,183	97.12%	37,257
Lee	51,769	96.55%	1,849	3.45%	49,920	93.10%	53,618
Randolph	9,192	98.91%	101	1.09%	9,091	97.83%	9,293
St. Clair	36,641	98.54%	543	1.46%	36,098	97.08%	37,184
Talladega (part)	22,759	97.96%	474	2.04%	22,285	95.92%	23,233
Tallapoosa	15,399	98.59%	221	1.41%	15,178	97.17%	15,620
Totals	243,848	97.93%	5,160	2.07%	238,688	95.86%	249,008

== District 4 ==
2024 Alabama's 4th congressional district election
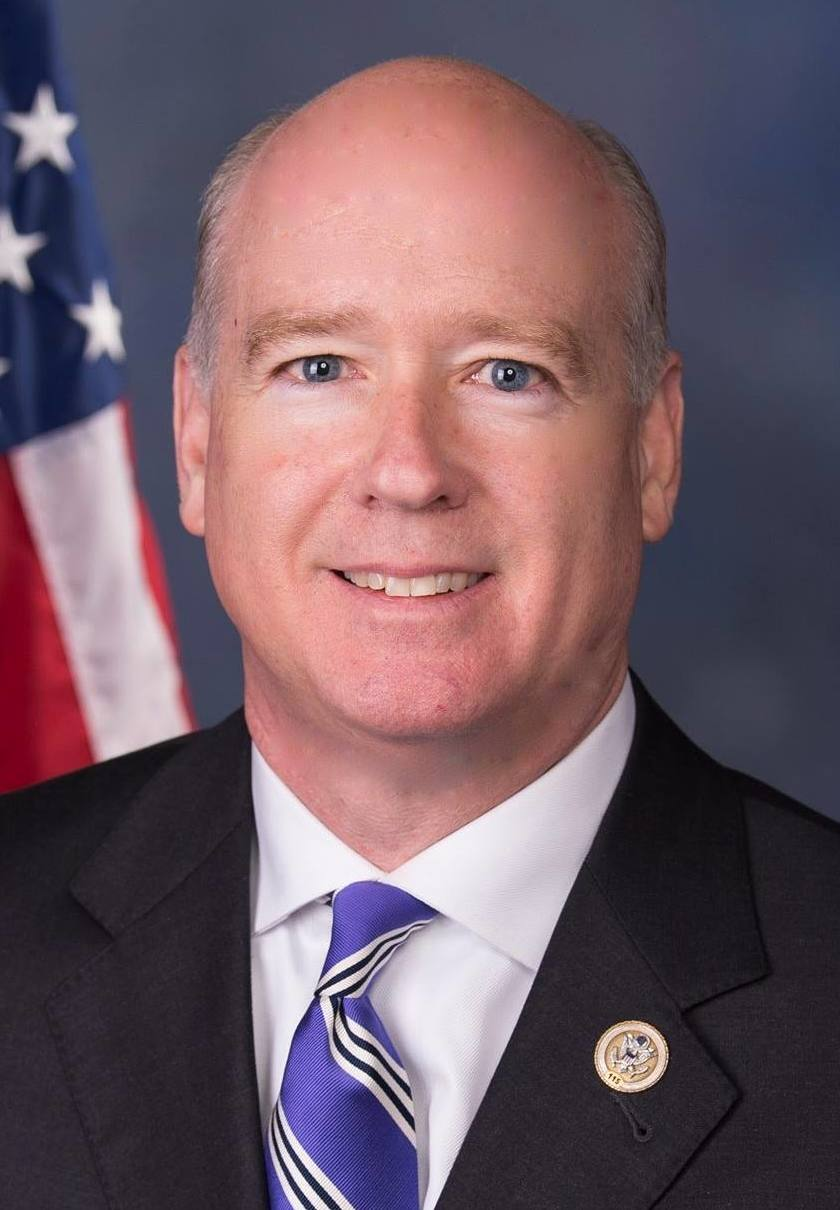
Nominee	Robert Aderholt
Party	Republican
Popular vote	274,498
Percentage	98.8%
- Precinct results Aderholt: 70–80% 80–90% >90%
U.S. Representative before election
Robert Aderholt
Republican
Elected U.S. Representative
Robert Aderholt
Republican

The 4th district is located in rural north-central Alabama, including Colbert, Cullman, Fayette, and Marion counties, as well as half of Lauderdale and Tuscaloosa counties. Blount County was also re-added to the district with the new map. It includes the cities of Cullman, Haleyville, Jasper, and Muscle Shoals. In 2022, according to the Cook Partisan Voting Index, it was the most Republican district in the country, with an index rating of R+33. The incumbent is Republican Robert Aderholt, who was re-elected with 84.2% of the vote in 2022.

No Democratic candidates qualified to run in this district, though Aderholt faced one unsuccessful primary challenger, Justin Holcomb.

=== Republican primary ===
==== Nominee ====
- Robert Aderholt, incumbent U.S. representative

==== Eliminated in primary ====
- Justin Holcomb, businessman

==== Endorsements ====
Robert Aderholt

Executive branch officials

- Donald Trump, 45th president of the United States

Organizations

- AIPAC
- Alabama Realtors PAC
- National Rifle Association Political Victory Fund
- U.S. Chamber of Commerce (post-primary)
Justin Holcomb

Organizations

- Alabama Republican Assembly

==== Fundraising ====
Campaign finance reports as of February 14, 2024
Candidate	Raised	Spent	Cash on hand
Robert Aderholt (R)	$816,371	$837,622	$1,138,193
Justin Holcomb (R)	$6,200 (Note: $4,500 of this total was self-funded by Holcomb)	$4,616	$3,669
Source: Federal Election Commission

==== Debates and forums ====
2024 AL-4 Republican primary debates and forums
No.	Date	Location	Host	Moderator	Link	Participants	
P Participant A Absent I Invited							
P Participant A Absent I Invited						Aderholt	Holcomb
1	February 22, 2024	Guntersville	Marshall County Republican Women	Unknown (forum)	N/A	P	P

==== Results ====
Republican primary results
Party	Candidate	Votes	%
Republican	Robert Aderholt (incumbent)	79,083	79.8
Republican	Justin Holcomb	20,025	20.2
Total votes		99,108	100.0

=== General election ===
==== Predictions ====
Source	Ranking	As of
The Cook Political Report	Safe R	October 20, 2023
Inside Elections	Safe R	October 20, 2023
Sabato's Crystal Ball	Safe R	October 4, 2023
Elections Daily	Safe R	October 5, 2023
CNalysis	Safe R	November 16, 2023
Decision Desk HQ	Safe R	October 22, 2024

==== Fundraising ====
Campaign finance reports as of March 31, 2024
Candidate	Raised	Spent	Cash on hand
Robert Aderholt (R)	$1,025,854	$1,289,920	$895,378
Source: Federal Election Commission

==== Results ====
2024 Alabama's 4th congressional district election
Party	Candidate	Votes	%
Republican	Robert Aderholt (incumbent)	274,498	98.8
Write-in		3,374	1.2
Total votes		277,872	100.0
Republican hold			

==== By county ====
County	Robert Aderholt Republican		Write-in Various		Margin		Total
County	#	%	#	%	#	%	Total
Blount	25,499	99.31%	176	0.69%	25,323	98.63%	25,675
Colbert	20,595	98.42%	331	1.58%	20,264	96.84%	20,926
Cullman	39,110	99.19%	319	0.81%	38,791	98.38%	39,429
DeKalb	25,753	98.91%	284	1.09%	25,469	97.82%	26,037
Fayette	7,245	99.30%	51	0.70%	7,194	98.60%	7,296
Franklin	10,496	99.24%	80	0.76%	10,416	98.49%	10,576
Lamar	6,037	99.51%	30	0.49%	6,007	99.01%	6,067
Lauderdale (part)	26,275	98.02%	532	1.98%	25,743	96.03%	26,807
Marion	12,275	99.30%	87	0.70%	12,188	98.59%	12,362
Marshall	35,330	98.80%	429	1.20%	34,901	97.60%	35,759
Tuscaloosa (part)	29,640	97.80%	668	2.20%	28,972	95.59%	30,308
Walker	26,026	98.87%	297	1.13%	25,729	97.74%	26,323
Winston	10,217	99.13%	90	0.87%	10,127	98.25%	10,307
Totals	274,498	98.79%	3,374	1.21%	271,124	97.57%	277,872

== District 5 ==
2024 Alabama's 5th congressional district election
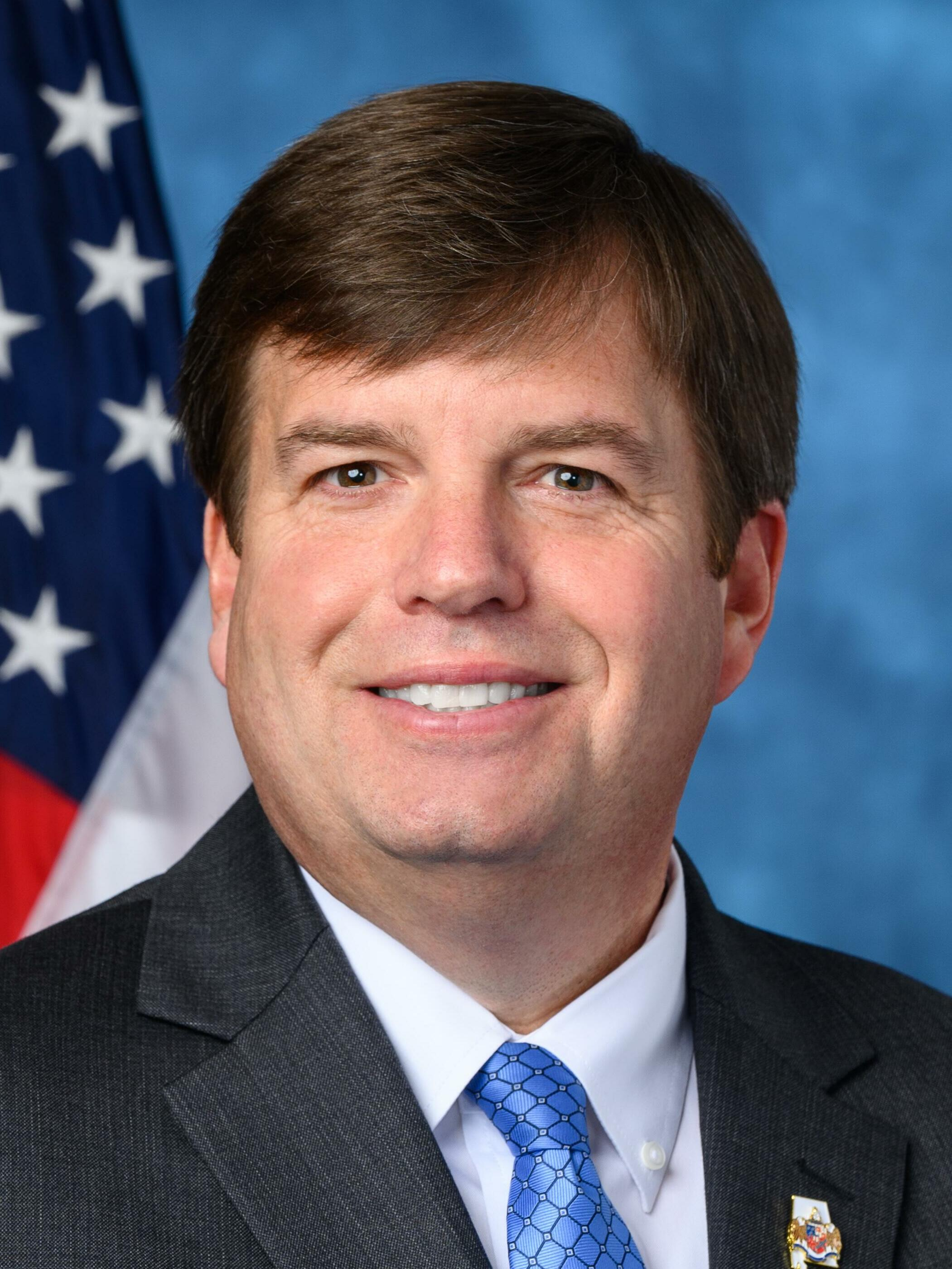
Nominee	Dale Strong
Party	Republican
Popular vote	250,322
Percentage	95.4%
- Precinct results Strong: 80–90% >90%
U.S. Representative before election
Dale Strong
Republican
Elected U.S. Representative
Dale Strong
Republican

The 5th district is based in northern Alabama, including the city of Huntsville, as well as Athens, Decatur, Madison, and Scottsboro, as well as half of Lauderdale County. The incumbent is first-term Republican Dale Strong, who was elected with 67.2% of the vote in 2022.

No Democratic candidates qualified to run in this district. Strong initially faced one primary challenger, former state representative Daniel Boman, who was a member of the Democratic Party during most of his tenure, but switched back to the Republican Party after leaving office. Boman faced a challenge to his candidacy from within the Alabama Republican Party; he was officially removed from the ballot in December 2023. This effectively left Strong unopposed in 2024.

=== Republican primary ===
==== Nominee ====
- Dale Strong, incumbent U.S. representative

==== Removed from ballot ====
- Daniel Boman, former state representative from the 16th district (2011–2015)

==== Endorsements ====
Dale Strong

Executive branch officials

- Donald Trump, 45th president of the United States

Organizations

- Alabama Realtors PAC
- National Rifle Association Political Victory Fund

==== Fundraising ====
Campaign finance reports as of February 14, 2024
Candidate	Raised	Spent	Cash on hand
Dale Strong (R)	$750,902	$402,246	$367,701
Source: Federal Election Commission

=== General election ===
==== Predictions ====
Source	Ranking	As of
The Cook Political Report	Solid R	October 20, 2023
Inside Elections	Solid R	October 20, 2023
Sabato's Crystal Ball	Safe R	October 4, 2023
Elections Daily	Safe R	October 5, 2023
CNalysis	Solid R	November 16, 2023
Decision Desk HQ	Safe R	October 22, 2024

==== Fundraising ====
Campaign finance reports as of March 31, 2024
Candidate	Raised	Spent	Cash on hand
Dale Strong (R)	$920,490	$447,119	$492,416
Source: Federal Election Commission

==== Results ====
2024 Alabama's 5th congressional district election
Party	Candidate	Votes	%
Republican	Dale Strong (incumbent)	250,322	95.4
Write-in		12,088	4.6
Total votes		262,410	100.0
Republican hold			

==== By county ====
County	Dale Strong Republican		Write-in Various		Margin		Total
County	#	%	#	%	#	%	Total
Jackson	20,055	99.12%	178	0.88%	19,877	98.24%	20,233
Lauderdale (part)	7,891	98.92%	86	1.08%	7,805	97.84%	7,977
Lawrence	12,992	99.03%	127	0.97%	12,865	98.06%	13,119
Limestone	40,891	96.68%	1,403	3.32%	39,488	93.37%	42,294
Madison	126,175	93.02%	9,464	6.98%	116,711	86.05%	135,639
Morgan	42,318	98.08%	830	1.92%	41,488	96.15%	43,148
Totals	250,322	95.39%	12,088	4.61%	238,234	90.79%	262,410

== District 6 ==
2024 Alabama's 6th congressional district election
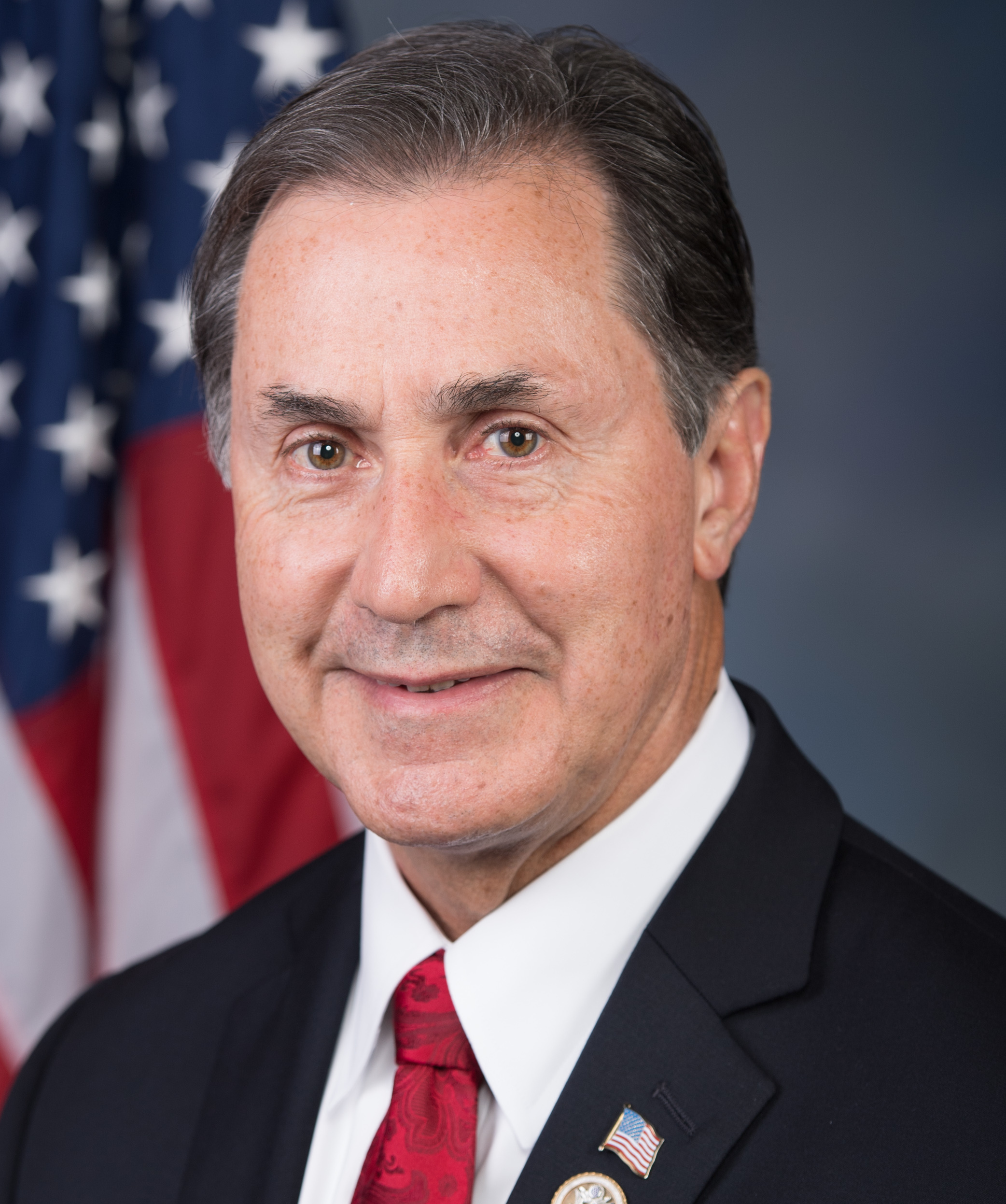

Nominee	Gary Palmer	Elizabeth Anderson
Party	Republican	Democratic
Popular vote	243,741	102,504
Percentage	70.3%	29.6%
- Palmer: 50–60% 60–70% 70–80% 80–90% >90% Anderson: 50–60% 60–70% 70–80% 80–90% >90% Tie: 50%
U.S. Representative before election
Gary Palmer
Republican
Elected U.S. Representative
Gary Palmer
Republican

The 6th district encompasses the central part of the state near Greater Birmingham, taking in the northeastern parts of the city of Birmingham and Jefferson County, as well as the surrounding suburbs, including Bibb, Chilton, Coosa, and Shelby counties. Other cities include Alabaster, Hoover and Montevallo. The incumbent is Republican Gary Palmer, who was re-elected with 84.7% of the vote in 2022 against a Libertarian candidate.

Palmer's re-election campaign gained attention due to his 2014 signing of the U.S. Term Limits Pledge and campaign promise to not run for more than five terms to Congress. Palmer's previous statements meant that he would have retired in 2024, however, Palmer chose to seek a sixth term in this election. Palmer cited his reasons for seeking re-election, including recent high turnover in Alabama's congressional delegation, his rise to Republican leadership within the House of Representatives, and personal prayer, saying that he had "prayed for God to give me clarity on it". He disputed media reports (including an article by AL.com) that characterized his five-term limit as being part of the U.S. Term Limits pledge, when in fact, the pledge only applied to sponsoring legislation. However, Palmer acknowledged that he did claim during his 2014 campaign that he would serve no more than five terms, and said he would "own that", regarding breaking that campaign promise.

=== Republican primary ===
==== Nominee ====
- Gary Palmer, incumbent U.S. representative

==== Eliminated in primary ====
- Ken McFeeters, insurance agent
- Gerrick Wilkins, automotive businessman

==== Declined ====
- April Weaver, state senator from the 14th district (2021–present)

==== Endorsements ====
Gary Palmer

Executive branch officials

- Donald Trump, 45th president of the United States
- Cliff Sims, Deputy Director of National Intelligence for Strategy and Communications (2020–2021)

U.S. representatives

- Jim Jordan, U.S. representative for Ohio's 4th congressional district (2007–present)

Organizations

- AIPAC
- Alabama Republican Assembly
- Alabama Realtors PAC
- National Rifle Association Political Victory Fund
Gerrick Wilkins

Executive branch officials

- Michael Flynn, 24th United States National Security Advisor (2017)

Local officials

- Jeff Mims, mayor of Clanton (2020–present)

==== Fundraising ====
Campaign finance reports as of February 14, 2024
Candidate	Raised	Spent	Cash on hand
Gary Palmer (R)	$1,167,042	$1,260,807	$352,300
Gerrick Wilkins (R)	$275,121 (Note: $90,000 of this total was self-funded by Wilkins)	$270,506	$4,615
Source: Federal Election Commission

==== Debates and forums ====
2024 AL-6 Republican primary debates and forums
No.	Date	Location	Host	Moderator	Link	Participants		
P Participant A Absent I Invited								
P Participant A Absent I Invited						McFeeters	Palmer	Wilkins
1	January 13, 2024	Vestavia Hills	Mid-Alabama Republican Club	Justin Barkley	N/A	P	P	P

==== Results ====
Republican primary results
Party	Candidate	Votes	%
Republican	Gary Palmer (incumbent)	76,488	83.2
Republican	Gerrick Wilkins	9,701	10.6
Republican	Ken McFeeters	5,705	6.2
Total votes		91,894	100.0

=== Democratic primary ===
==== Nominee ====
- Elizabeth Anderson, businesswoman

==== Fundraising ====
Campaign finance reports as of February 14, 2024
Candidate	Raised	Spent	Cash on hand
Elizabeth Anderson (D)	$16,642 (Note: $3,480 of this total was self-funded by Anderson)	$11,459	$5,182
Source: Federal Election Commission

=== General election ===
==== Predictions ====
Source	Ranking	As of
The Cook Political Report	Solid R	October 20, 2023
Inside Elections	Solid R	October 20, 2023
Sabato's Crystal Ball	Safe R	October 4, 2023
Elections Daily	Safe R	October 5, 2023
CNalysis	Solid R	November 16, 2023
Decision Desk HQ	Safe R	October 22, 2024

==== Fundraising ====
Campaign finance reports as of February 14, 2024
Candidate	Raised	Spent	Cash on hand
Gary Palmer (R)	$1,385,658	$1,620,289	$211,433
Elizabeth Anderson (D)	$26,618 (Note: $3,480 of this total was self-funded by Anderson)	$15,172	$11,445
Source: Federal Election Commission

==== Results ====
2024 Alabama's 6th congressional district election
Party	Candidate	Votes	%
Republican	Gary Palmer (incumbent)	243,741	70.3
Democratic	Elizabeth Anderson	102,504	29.6
Write-in		380	0.1
Total votes		346,625	100.0
Republican hold			

==== By county ====
County	Gary Palmer Republican		Elizabeth Anderson Democratic		Write-in Various		Margin		Total
County	#	%	#	%	#	%	#	%	Total
Autauga	20,386	73.19%	7,432	26.68%	34	0.12%	12,954	46.51%	27,852
Bibb	7,486	81.81%	1,654	18.08%	10	0.11%	5,832	63.74%	9,150
Chilton	16,606	85.95%	2,695	13.95%	20	0.10%	13,911	72.00%	19,321
Coosa	3,735	71.84%	1,461	28.10%	3	0.06%	2,274	43.74%	5,199
Elmore	31,355	76.37%	9,672	23.56%	28	0.07%	21,683	52.81%	41,055
Jefferson (part)	82,326	63.69%	46,794	36.20%	140	0.11%	35,532	27.49%	129,260
Shelby	80,925	71.15%	32,665	28.72%	143	0.13%	48,260	42.43%	113,733
Talladega (part)	922	87.39%	131	12.42%	2	0.19%	791	74.98%	1,055
Totals	243,741	70.32%	102,504	29.57%	380	0.11%	141,237	40.75%	346,625

== District 7 ==
2024 Alabama's 7th congressional district election
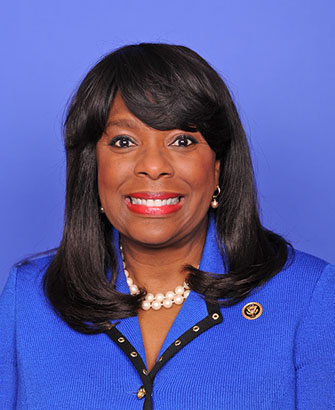

Nominee	Terri Sewell	Robin Litaker
Party	Democratic	Republican
Popular vote	186,723	106,312
Percentage	63.7%	36.3%
- Sewell: 50–60% 60–70% 70–80% 80–90% >90% Litaker: 50–60% 60–70% 70–80% 80–90% >90%
U.S. Representative before election
Terri Sewell
Democratic
Elected U.S. Representative
Terri Sewell
Democratic

The 7th district encompasses the west-central part of the state in the Black Belt, including the cities of Demopolis, Greensboro, and Selma, as well as taking in majority-black areas of Birmingham and Tuscaloosa. The incumbent is Democrat Terri Sewell, who was re-elected with 63.6% of the vote in 2022.

Sewell is running for reelection to an eighth term. State senator and Senate Minority Leader Bobby Singleton formed an exploratory committee to run against Sewell, but ultimately did not enter the race. However, Sewell did face one unsuccessful Democratic primary challenger, Chris Davis.

In the Republican primary, candidate Christian Horn officially withdrew from the race on February 25, 2024, leaving Robin Litaker as the only active candidate seeking the Republican nomination. 1819 News reported that votes for Horn would not be certified, and that the Alabama Republican Party had been notified of Horn's withdrawal. However, Horn won the primary on March 5 despite his withdrawal. The Alabama Republican Party later published a press release clarifying that Horn had dropped out of the race and Litaker would be the party's nominee in 2024.

=== Democratic primary ===
==== Nominee ====
- Terri Sewell, incumbent U.S. representative

==== Eliminated in primary ====
- Chris Davis, business development director

==== Endorsements ====
Terri Sewell

Organizations

- AIPAC
- Alabama Realtors PAC
- Feminist Majority PAC
- Humane Society Legislative Fund

Labor unions

- National Education Association

==== Fundraising ====
Campaign finance reports as of February 14, 2024
Candidate	Raised	Spent	Cash on hand
Terri Sewell (D)	$1,603,504	$903,592	$3,595,843
Source: Federal Election Commission

==== Results ====
Democratic primary results
Party	Candidate	Votes	%
Democratic	Terri Sewell (incumbent)	59,153	92.6
Democratic	Chris Davis	4,715	7.4
Total votes		63,868	100.0

=== Republican primary ===
==== Nominee ====
- Robin Litaker, retired teacher and perennial candidate

==== Withdrew ====
- Christian Horn, engineer and candidate for Secretary of State in 2022 (unofficially won primary after withdrawal)

==== Endorsements ====
Robin Litaker

Organizations

- Alabama Republican Assembly

==== Fundraising ====
Campaign finance reports as of February 14, 2024
Candidate	Raised	Spent	Cash on hand
Robin Litaker (R)	$7,423 (Note: $4,680 of this total was self-funded by Litaker)	$5,214	$2,208
Source: Federal Election Commission

==== Results ====
Republican primary results
Party	Candidate	Votes	%
Republican	Robin Litaker	12,990	100.0
Total votes		12,990 (Note: Christian Horn, having withdrawn from the race but subsequently winning said race, had his vote count nullified in the official results released by the Secretary of State.)	100.0

=== General election ===
==== Predictions ====
Source	Ranking	As of
The Cook Political Report	Solid D	October 20, 2023
Inside Elections	Solid D	October 20, 2023
Sabato's Crystal Ball	Safe D	October 4, 2023
Elections Daily	Safe D	October 5, 2023
CNalysis	Solid D	November 16, 2023
Decision Desk HQ	Safe D	October 22, 2024

==== Fundraising ====
Campaign finance reports as of February 14, 2024
Candidate	Raised	Spent	Cash on hand
Terri Sewell (D)	$2,031,082	$1,281,941	$3,645,072
Robin Litaker (R)	$8,224 (Note: $4,680 of this total was self-funded by Litaker)	$5,969	$2,255
Source: Federal Election Commission

==== Results ====
2024 Alabama's 7th congressional district election
Party	Candidate	Votes	%
Democratic	Terri Sewell (incumbent)	186,723	63.7
Republican	Robin Litaker	106,312	36.3
Write-in		185	0.1
Total votes		293,220	100.0
Democratic hold			

==== By county ====
County	Terri Sewell Democratic		Robin Litaker Republican		Write-in Various		Margin		Total
County	#	%	#	%	#	%	#	%	Total
Choctaw	2,683	41.07%	3,845	58.86%	4	0.06%	-1,162	-17.79%	6,532
Clarke (part)	3,377	37.00%	5,748	62.98%	2	0.02%	-2,371	-25.98%	9,127
Dallas	10,777	69.80%	4,658	30.17%	4	0.03%	6,119	39.63%	15,439
Greene	3,215	80.52%	777	19.46%	1	0.03%	2,438	61.06%	3,993
Hale	4,061	56.36%	3,138	43.55%	7	0.10%	923	12.81%	7,206
Jefferson (part)	116,527	69.84%	50,213	30.09%	118	0.07%	66,314	39.74%	166,858
Lowndes	3,930	71.07%	1,599	28.92%	1	0.02%	2,331	42.15%	5,530
Marengo	4,930	51.62%	4,613	48.30%	7	0.07%	317	3.32%	9,550
Perry	3,252	73.66%	1,163	26.34%	0	0.00%	2,089	47.32%	4,415
Pickens	3,583	40.51%	5,261	59.48%	1	0.01%	-1,678	-18.97%	8,845
Sumter	3,848	73.28%	1,401	26.68%	2	0.04%	2,447	46.60%	5,251
Tuscaloosa (part)	22,976	50.74%	22,273	49.19%	35	0.08%	703	1.55%	45,284
Wilcox	3,564	68.67%	1,623	31.27%	3	0.06%	1,941	37.40%	5,190
Totals	186,723	63.68%	106,312	36.26%	185	0.06%	80,411	27.42%	293,220

== Notes ==
Partisan clients
