= Andrew Sorrell =

American politician (born 1985 or 1986)

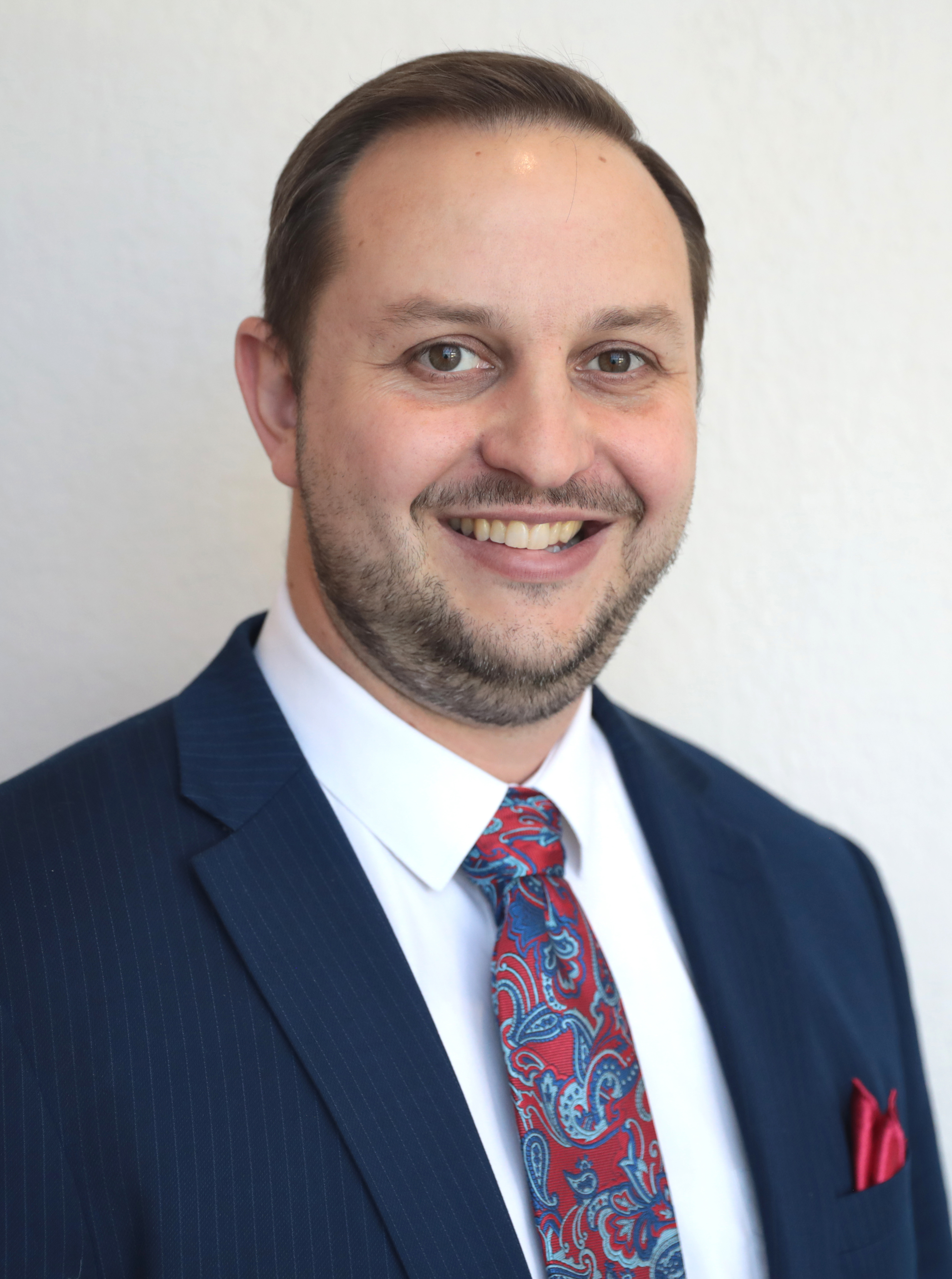

Auditor of Alabama
- Incumbent
- Assumed office January 16, 2023
- Governor: Kay Ivey; Tommy Tuberville (elect)
- Preceded by: Jim Zeigler

Member of the Alabama House of Representatives from the 3rd district
- In office November 6, 2018 – November 10, 2022
- Preceded by: Marcel Black
- Succeeded by: Kerry Underwood

Personal details
- Born: Justin Andrew Sorrell; 1985 or 1986 (age 40–41) California, U.S.
- Party: Republican
- Spouse: Hannah Sorrell
- Children: 1
- Education: University of North Alabama (BA)

Justin Andrew Sorrell (born 1985) is an American politician who is the incumbent State Auditor of Alabama, serving since 2023. A member of the Republican Party, he previously served in the Alabama House of Representatives from 2018 to 2022, representing the 3rd district, which includes the northwestern counties of Colbert and Lawrence.

Described as a "firebrand" by Yellowhammer News, Sorrell was first elected in 2018; he was annually named as one of the "most conservative" representatives in the Alabama Legislature, as well as among the most conservative state legislators in the United States. He was elected as state auditor in the 2022 election cycle after defeating pastor Stan Cooke in a runoff.

== Early life and career ==
Sorrell was born in California; his family moved to Wisconsin when he was six weeks old. Sorrell's father, a college instructor, took a job teaching Greek at a university. They resided in Wisconsin for six years before Sorrell's father was laid off. The family moved to Alabama so that Sorrell's father could take a position as a pastor at a church in Muscle Shoals, Alabama. Sorrell graduated from Muscle Shoals High School in 2004.

At age 16, Sorrell co-founded a business partnership with his brother Matthew to re-sell college textbooks. Andrew and Matthew Sorrell became known as "the book guys" on the campus of the University of North Alabama, which they both attended. They grew their company, Infinity College Textbooks, to forty employees and over a million dollars in revenue before selling it. Sorrell eventually graduated and attained a business management degree from the University of North Alabama. After graduation, Sorrell opened a pawn shop for firearms. He later restructured the business and opened a second store, named Gold, Guns, & Guitars, in April 2015. Sorrell's other business ventures include an expansion of Gold, Guns, & Guitars to Huntsville, Alabama, and a real estate investment company, Fast Track Investments Inc.

Sorrell first became involved in politics by helping run local Republican campaigns with his brother Matthew, but found little success. The brothers attended classes in Washington, D.C. that taught campaign management, and returned to Alabama with more expertise that helped their campaigns win more elections. During the 2016 Republican Party presidential primaries, Sorrell was an alternate delegate for Ted Cruz, and served as a manager for Cruz's state-level campaign in Alabama's 5th congressional district. Sorrell was first elected to the Alabama Republican Party State Executive Committee in 2010, and still serves as chairman of its bylaws committee, as of 2022. He unsuccessfully ran for vice chair of the Alabama Republican Party in 2021, being defeated by John Skipper, who had 53% of the vote to Sorrell's 47%.

== Alabama House of Representatives ==
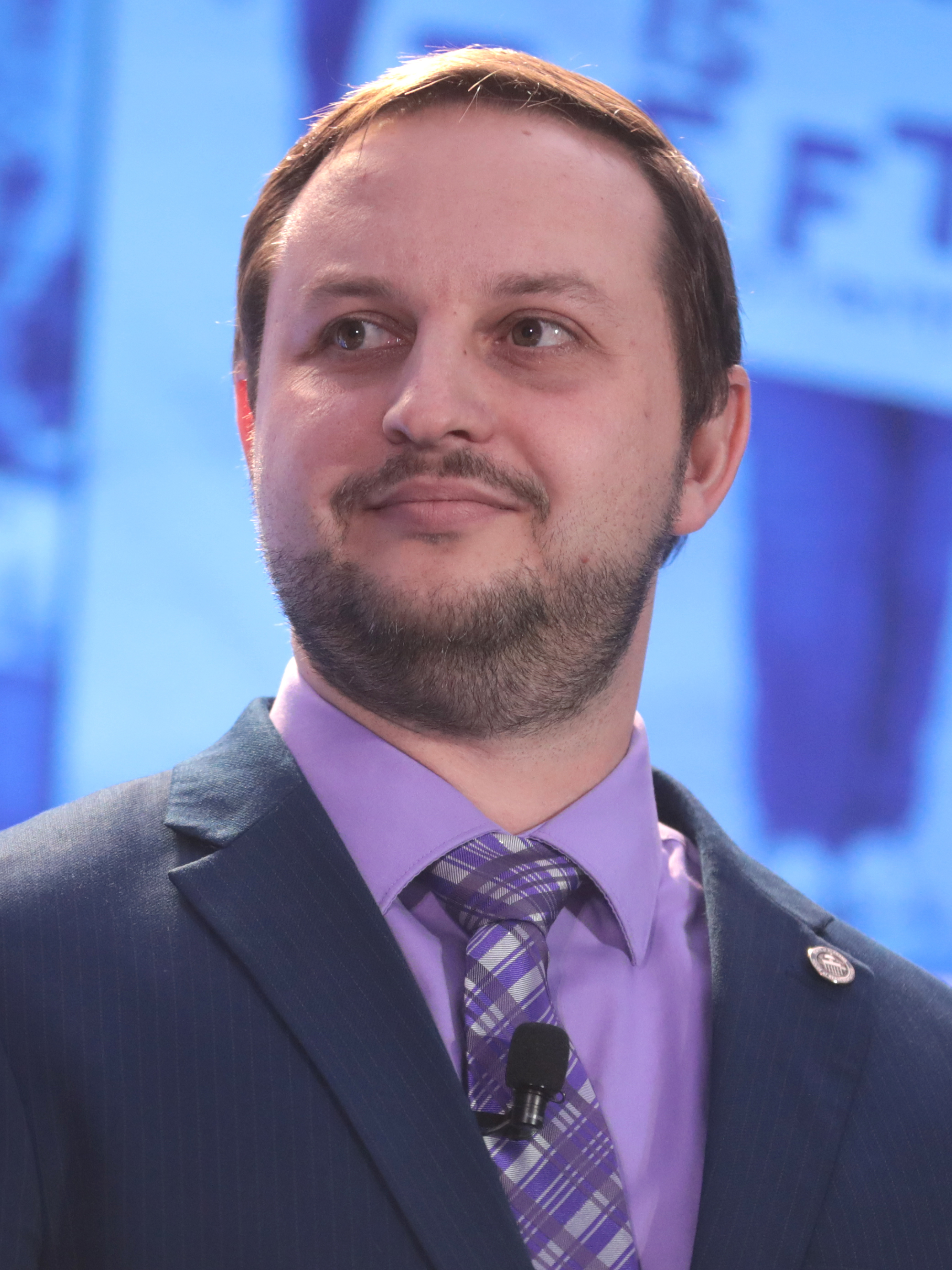
Sorrell at the Young Americans for Liberty Convention in 2019

Sorrell ran for election to the third district of the Alabama House of Representatives in the 2018 election cycle. At the time of his announcement in June 2017, the Alabama Political Reporter described Sorrell as a "well-known local anti-tax activist". The incumbent representative, Marcel Black of the Democratic Party, decided to retire after 28 years. Sorrell initially attempted to convince his father to run for the seat, but stood for election himself after his father declined. He raised over $180,000 during the campaign. Sorrell defeated Humphrey Lee in the Republican primary with 76% of the vote, and faced Democratic nominee Chad Young in the general election. AL.com described the third district's election as one of the "top political races to watch in north Alabama" in 2018. Sorrell defeated Young in the general election with 53% of the vote.

During his tenure, Sorrell was consistently named in media reports and by the Club for Growth as one of the most conservative members of the state legislature. He received the 2020 Conservative Policy Warrior Award from the Alabama Policy Institute for his votes to lower taxes and reduce the size of government. In 2021, the American Conservative Union's Center for Legislative Accountability gave Sorrell a 100% conservative rating, making him among the most conservative state legislators in the United States. Sorrell served on the legislative committees for Ethics and Campaign Finance, Technology and Research, and Financial Services.

As state representative, Sorrell was an "outspoken opponent" of Alabama's gas tax increase. According to Sorrell, 90% of constituents in his district opposed the gas tax during a telephone poll. He voted against it when it was first passed in 2019, and co-sponsored a 2022 bill to pause the increase. Sorrell also targeted Alabama's grocery tax in February 2020 with a bill that aimed to phase out the tax by 2040. In September 2020, Sorrell was one of two dissenting votes opposing an anti-price gouging bill targeting repair fraud in the wake of Hurricane Sally. Sorrell told AL.com that the rationale for his vote was that he believed such bills often had the opposite desired effect, adding "I think we should let the free market handle this stuff". In both 2020 and 2021, Sorrell was the sole representative to vote against the state's general fund budgets. He also voted against a 2% pay raise for teachers and state employees in 2021. In October 2022, after Governor Kay Ivey announced a one-time tax rebate, Sorrell advocated for permanent tax cuts instead, stating that "we need to rein our spending in. And if we reined it in even a little bit we could provide massive tax cuts for the people of Alabama, and I think we'd really be a magnet for bringing other people to this state".

In June 2019, Sorrell wrote an opinion article for AL.com in which he expressed both support for medical marijuana research and opposition towards government-run healthcare, saying, "I believe in the freedom of each individual to make medical decisions that best suit them and their loved ones". However, in May 2021, Sorrell voted against the bill that eventually became law permitting medical marijuana in Alabama.

During the COVID-19 pandemic, Sorrell opposed lockdowns, saying during an appearance on The Jeff Poor Show that citizens should be concerned about constitutional violations. In August 2021, Sorrell drafted a bill to prohibit mask mandates in schools, saying that masking should be a decision made by parents, not the school system. Sorrell worked with a Huntsville-based group known as "Unmask our Kids" to build support for the legislation. Regarding the bill, Sorrell stated, "I do support the right of parents who disagree with me to mask their kids. That should be their choice. I believe in protecting the right of parents to mask their children in school just as much as I believe in protecting the right of parents to not mask their children in school". However, these proposals never came to a vote during legislative sessions on the House floor. In the fall of 2021, Sorrell said he would continue to support efforts towards medical freedom in Alabama, and sponsored a bill that would allow workers to file lawsuit against employers for any adverse reaction to a workplace-mandated COVID-19 vaccine. He also joined several other Republican officials in Alabama who criticized Governor Ivey's executive order opposing federal vaccine mandates, saying that it did not go far enough; he wrote on Facebook that, "although strong in rhetoric, the order had very little in actual substance".

In July 2021, Sorrell, alongside representatives Lynn Greer and Phillip Pettus, signed a resolution in support of the president of the University of North Alabama's student government association. The student had previously made social media posts that were criticized by LGBT groups as homophobic, and was the subject of calls to resign. Sorrell also co-sponsored an anti-transgender "bathroom bill" in 2022, saying he did so because of the presence of a transgender student at Muscle Shoals High School. In February 2022, Sorrell authored a bill to outlaw medication abortions in Alabama.

Sorrell was also instrumental in passing constitutional carry in Alabama. In 2019, he sponsored a bill from a previous legislator to end the permit requirement for concealed handguns in Alabama, though it only had "six to eight" co-sponsors at the time. Over his tenure, Sorrell built support for the bill before eventually attaining 38 co-sponsors by 2021. Sorrell worked with fellow representative Shane Stringer to pass House Bill 272 for constitutional carry; it was signed into law by Governor Ivey in March 2022. Sorrell retrospectively called his contributions to constitutional carry one of his "greatest legislative accomplishments". Sorrell's other pro-gun efforts in the legislature included a 2020 bill that would prevent the state of Alabama from enforcing any federal red flag law; Sorrell said in a radio interview, "I don't think that red flag laws are going to pass in Alabama, but it is something we need to be really, really vigilant about".

In 2020, Sorrell served as chair of the Alabama Trump Delegation for the 2020 Republican National Convention, during which he cast Alabama's votes for Trump at the convention. After his election to the position of State Auditor, Sorrell was succeeded in the Alabama House of Representatives by fellow Republican Kerry "Bubba" Underwood in the third district.

== State Auditor of Alabama ==
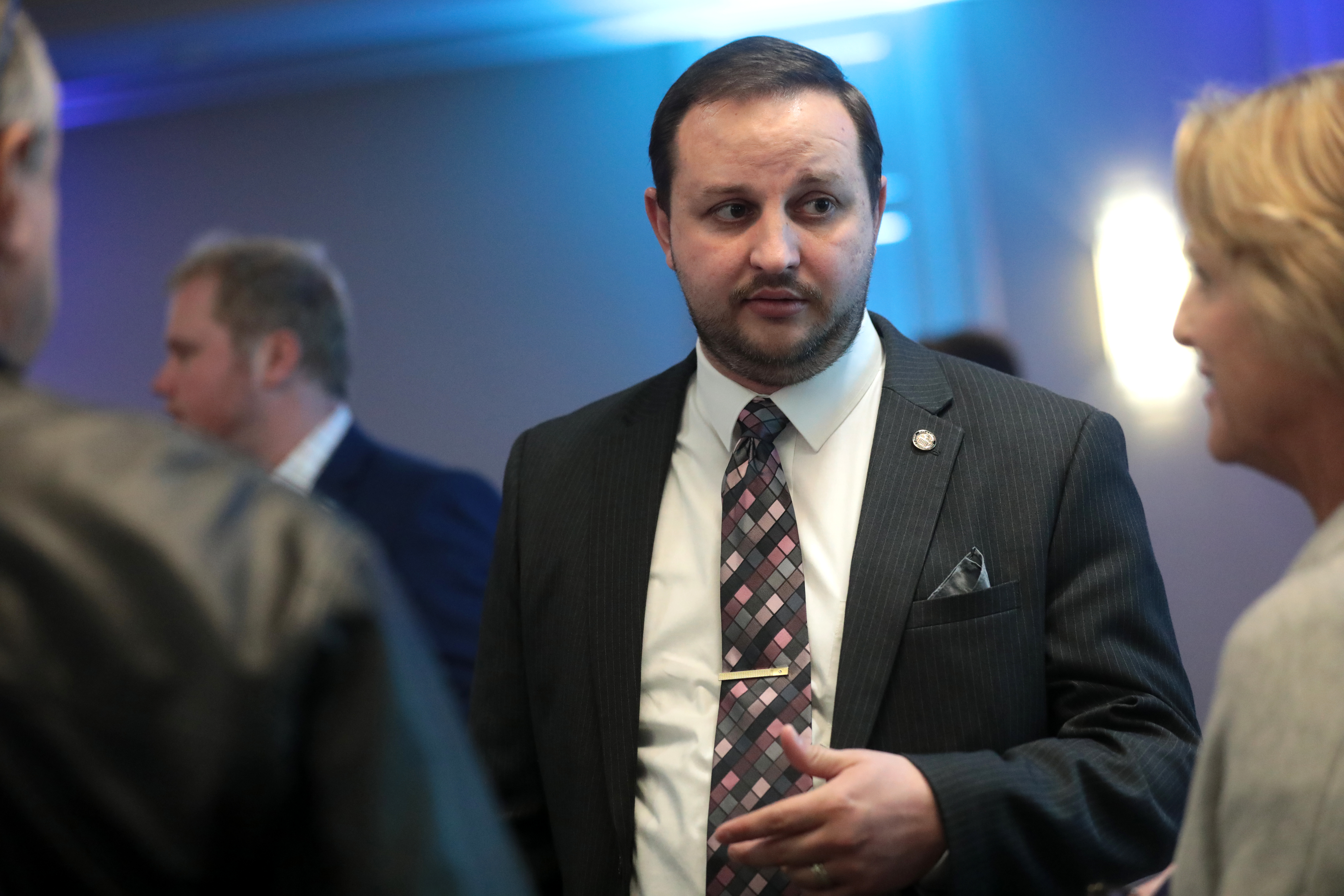
Sorrell at the University of Alabama in 2021

Sorrell was the first person to declare candidacy in the 2022 election for State Auditor of Alabama, seeking the Republican nomination. His campaign was announced in June 2021, with Sorrell stating "I want to make sure that every penny of property belonging to the citizens of Alabama is properly accounted for." The incumbent, Jim Zeigler, was term-limited. Sorrell faced two opponents in the Republican primary: Stan Cooke, a pastor and professional counselor, and Rusty Glover, a former state senator. During the campaign, Sorrell expressed support for making the state Examiner of Public Accounts report to the State Auditor, rather than a legislative board. He compared Alabama's auditing functions at the time to "a fox guarding the hen house". Sorrell had previously sponsored legislation as state representative to transfer the public examiners' department to the office of State Auditor. In the May 24 primary, Sorrell finished with 39.5% of the vote, ahead of Cooke and Glover, but not enough to avoid a runoff.

Sorrell faced Cooke in the June 21 runoff; the day before the election, Sorrell announced that he had more than doubled the fundraising record for a State Auditor election in Alabama. Sorrell won the runoff against Cooke with 57% of the vote. He faced Libertarian nominee Leigh Lachine in the general election; no Democratic candidate qualified in the auditor race. Sorrell won the general election with 85% of the vote and was inaugurated as State Auditor in January 2023.

After his election, Sorrell announced plans to expand the office and regain duties that had been transferred to the Examiner of Public Accounts. He also indicated support for creating government accountability and investigative divisions for the office of State Auditor. In March 2023, Sorrell announced that a bill would be introduced in the next legislative session with the aim of expanding the state auditor's powers to further investigate the state government.

Sorrell endorsed Ron DeSantis in the Republican primary for the 2024 U.S. presidential election. Regarding his endorsement, Sorrell said, "I know it will raise some eyebrows that the former Trump Delegation Chairman from 2020 is now endorsing DeSantis in 2024, but I didn't make this decision lightly". After DeSantis dropped out of the race, Sorrell switched his endorsement to Trump in February 2024, saying that he was "not a Nikki Haley fan". Sorrell was also a strong supporter of Allen Long, a candidate for the Alabama State Board of Education, in 2024. 1819 News described Sorrell as having pushed Long to victory in the Republican primary for the board's District 7 seat, with Sorrell helping raise money after Long's "last-minute" entry into the race.

=== 2026 elections ===
On February 24, 2025, Sorrell told 1819 News that he would run in the 2026 Alabama Secretary of State election, seeking the office of Alabama Secretary of State. The incumbent, Wes Allen, was instead running for lieutenant governor of Alabama. Shortly after candidate qualifying opened in January 2026, Sorrell announced that he would withdraw from the Secretary of State election, and would instead run for re-election to a second term as state auditor.

== Personal life ==
Sorrell is married to his wife Hannah Sorrell, a real estate agent who was also a delegate to the 2020 Republican National Convention; they have two daughters and one son together and reside in Muscle Shoals, Alabama. Sorrell is a private pilot and an advanced scuba diver.

Party political offices
Preceded by Jim Zeigler	Republican nominee for State Auditor of Alabama; 2022, 2026	Most recent
Political offices
Preceded by Jim Zeigler	Auditor of Alabama; 2023–present	Incumbent
