= Tom Jones (Alabama politician) =

American politician

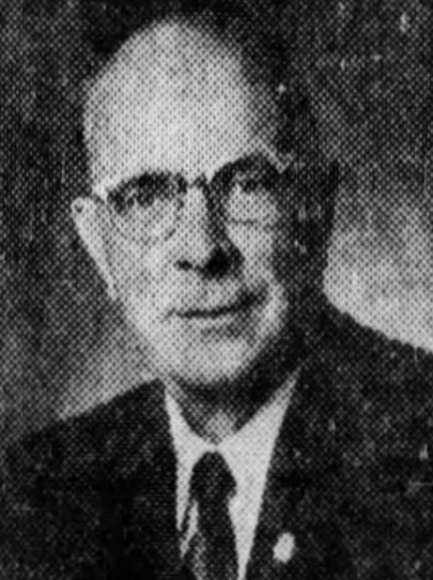
- Jones in 1970

Member of the Alabama Senate from the 21st district
- In office 1970–1974

Member of the Alabama House of Representatives from the 3rd district
- In office 1966–1970

Personal details
- Died: January 1, 1987 (aged 84)
- Party: Democratic

W. Tom Jones (died January 1, 1987) was an American politician. He served as a Democratic member for the 3rd district of the Alabama House of Representatives and as a member of the Alabama Senate for the 21st district.

Jones died on January 1, 1987, at the age of 84.
