= Electric Cooperatives of Alabama =

Political action committee in Alabama

The Electric Cooperatives of Alabama is a political action committee that works as the political arm for the Alabama Rural Electric Association of Cooperatives.

== Endorsements ==
=== 2026 ===
- 2026 Alabama gubernatorial election – Tommy Tuberville
- 2026 Alabama Attorney General election – Jay Mitchell
- 2026 Alabama Secretary of State election – Caroleene Dobson
- 2026 Alabama State Auditor election – Derek Chen
