= Charles E. Grainger =

American politician (1937–2022)

Member of the Alabama House of Representatives from the 3rd district
- In office 1970–1974

Personal details
- Born: Charles Edward Grainger; May 22, 1937 Lawrence County, Alabama, U.S.
- Died: December 10, 2022 (aged 85) Sandy Springs, Georgia, U.S.
- Spouse: Mary Sullenberger
- Children: 3
- Education: University of North Alabama; University of Mississippi; University of Alabama; Southeastern Institute of Technology
- Occupation: Politician, journalist

Charles Edward Grainger (May 22, 1937 – December 10, 2022) was an American politician and journalist who served in the Alabama House of Representatives from 1970 to 1974, representing the 3rd legislative district of Alabama.

== Early life and education ==
Grainger was born in Lawrence County, Alabama, on May 22, 1937, to Olen and Lorene Marsh Grainger. He attended the University of North Alabama, the University of Mississippi, the University of Alabama, and Southeastern Institute of Technology.

== Career ==
Prior to entering politics, Grainger was a journalist. He was a reporter for The Birmingham News, the largest newspaper in Alabama. He worked at Teledyne Brown Engineering, retiring after 40 years to establish his own consulting firm.

In 1970, Grainger was elected to represent the 3rd legislative district of Alabama in the Alabama House of Representatives. He served until 1974.

Grainger served as the director of Cummings Research Park until his retirement in 2017. He also worked as a private economic development consultant.

== Personal life and death ==
Grainger was married to Mary Sullenberger for 55 years. They had three children.

Grainger met multiple United States presidents over the course of his life. He met Harry S. Truman at the age of 13 after being invited to the White House to be honored for his bond sales. Grainger also met John F. Kennedy shortly before his assassination as an editor of The Valley Voice, having been invited for a luncheon to discuss resolving racial problems in the South. Four days later, Grainger was asked to help coordinate Kennedy's visit to Muscle Shoals in celebration of the 30th anniversary of the Tennessee Valley Authority.

Grainger wrote a memoir titled My Journey Through a Changing South, detailing his childhood in rural Alabama during the Great Depression. In his memoir, Grainger claimed to have experienced several near-death experiences throughout his life, including nearly dying twice as an infant, almost drowning as a teenager, and escaping death as a young adult while flying on a small plane.

Grainger died in Sandy Springs, Georgia, on December 10, 2022, at the age of 85.

Alabama House of Representatives
Preceded by —	Member of the Alabama House of Representatives from the 3rd district 1970–1974	Succeeded by —
