= 2024 Alabama Public Service Commission election =

- November 5, 2024
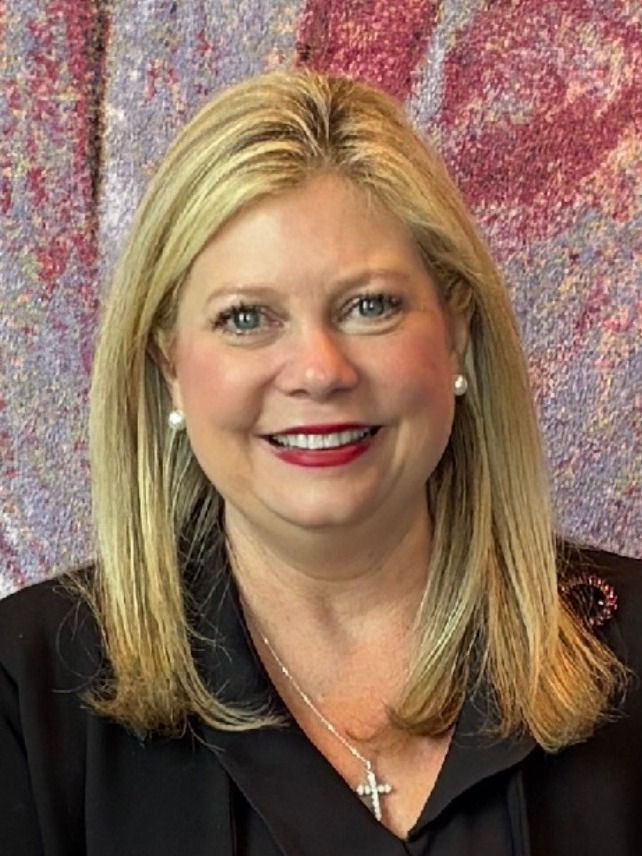
| Candidate | Twinkle Andress Cavanaugh |
| Party | Republican |
| Popular vote | 1,538,888 |
| Percentage | 97.34% |
- County results Cavanaugh: >90%
President before election
Twinkle Andress Cavanaugh
Republican
Elected President
Twinkle Andress Cavanaugh
Republican

The 2024 Alabama Public Service Commission election was held on November 5, 2024, to elect the president of the Alabama Public Service Commission. This was the last election for the position, as the commission changed to elect seven members by congressional district following the 2026 election.

== Republican primary ==
Cavanaugh was considered the favorite in the primary, and easily defeated Robert McCollum.

=== Candidates ===
==== Nominee ====
- Twinkle Andress Cavanaugh, incumbent president.

==== Eliminated in primary ====
- Robert McCollum, small business owner.

=== Endorsements ===
Twinkle Andress Cavanaugh (R)

Organizations

- Alabama Forestry Association

=== Results ===
Republican primary results
| Party | Candidate | Votes | % |
|---|---|---|---|
| Republican | Twinkle Andress Cavanaugh (incumbent) | 330,483 | 61.13 |
| Republican | Robert McCollum | 210,122 | 38.87 |
| Total votes | | 540,605 | 100 |

Results by county: Cavanaugh: 50–60%; 60–70%; 70–80%; 80–90%; McCollum: 50–60%

== General election ==
=== Results ===
Votes cast for Twinkle Andress Cavanaugh in proportion to turnout by county. Counties in gray had more blank ballots and write-in votes cast than votes for Cavanaugh. 80–90% 70–80% 60–70% 50–60% 40–50% 30–40% 20–30%

2024 Alabama Public Service Commission president election
| Party | Candidate | Votes | % |
|---|---|---|---|
| Republican | Twinkle Andress Cavanaugh (incumbent) | 1,538,888 | 97.34% |
| Write-in | | 42,061 | 2.66% |
| Total votes | | 1,580,949 | 100.00% |
| Turnout | | 2,272,911 | 58.85% |
| Blank ballots | | 691,962 | 30.44% |

==== By county ====
| County | Twinkle Andress Cavanaugh Republican | | Write-in Various | | Margin | | Total |
| County | # | % | # | % | # | % | Total |
|---|---|---|---|---|---|---|---|
| Autauga | 21,173 | 97.54% | 533 | 2.46% | 20,640 | 95.09% | 21,706 |
| Baldwin | 99,235 | 98.62% | 1,392 | 1.38% | 97,843 | 97.23% | 100,627 |
| Barbour | 5,586 | 97.71% | 131 | 2.29% | 5,455 | 95.42% | 5,717 |
| Bibb | 7,561 | 98.50% | 115 | 1.50% | 7,446 | 97.00% | 7,676 |
| Blount | 24,936 | 98.77% | 310 | 1.23% | 24,626 | 97.54% | 25,246 |
| Bullock | 1,218 | 95.45% | 58 | 4.55% | 1,160 | 90.91% | 1,276 |
| Butler | 5,311 | 98.44% | 84 | 1.56% | 5,227 | 96.89% | 5,395 |
| Calhoun | 36,044 | 97.60% | 886 | 2.40% | 35,158 | 95.20% | 36,930 |
| Chambers | 9,283 | 97.66% | 222 | 2.34% | 9,061 | 95.33% | 9,505 |
| Cherokee | 11,260 | 99.37% | 71 | 0.63% | 11,189 | 98.75% | 11,331 |
| Chilton | 16,313 | 98.82% | 195 | 1.18% | 16,118 | 97.64% | 16,508 |
| Choctaw | 4,033 | 98.87% | 46 | 1.13% | 3,987 | 97.74% | 4,079 |
| Clarke | 7,147 | 98.58% | 103 | 1.42% | 7,044 | 97.16% | 7,250 |
| Clay | 5,626 | 99.12% | 50 | 0.88% | 5,576 | 98.24% | 5,676 |
| Cleburne | 6,781 | 99.41% | 40 | 0.59% | 6,741 | 98.83% | 6,821 |
| Coffee | 17,887 | 98.78% | 221 | 1.22% | 17,666 | 97.56% | 18,108 |
| Colbert | 20,021 | 98.55% | 294 | 1.45% | 19,727 | 97.11% | 20,315 |
| Conecuh | 3,210 | 98.32% | 55 | 1.68% | 3,155 | 96.63% | 3,265 |
| Coosa | 3,752 | 98.53% | 56 | 1.47% | 3,696 | 97.06% | 3,808 |
| Covington | 14,293 | 99.38% | 89 | 0.62% | 14,204 | 98.76% | 14,382 |
| Crenshaw | 4,909 | 99.01% | 49 | 0.99% | 4,860 | 98.02% | 4,958 |
| Cullman | 38,363 | 99.30% | 270 | 0.70% | 38,093 | 98.60% | 38,633 |
| Dale | 15,060 | 97.98% | 311 | 2.02% | 14,749 | 95.95% | 15,371 |
| Dallas | 5,586 | 95.41% | 269 | 4.59% | 5,317 | 90.81% | 5,855 |
| DeKalb | 25,340 | 99.28% | 184 | 0.72% | 25,156 | 98.56% | 25,524 |
| Elmore | 32,304 | 98.13% | 616 | 1.87% | 31,688 | 96.26% | 32,920 |
| Escambia | 11,107 | 98.74% | 142 | 1.26% | 10,965 | 97.48% | 11,249 |
| Etowah | 36,004 | 98.24% | 645 | 1.76% | 35,359 | 96.48% | 36,649 |
| Fayette | 7,045 | 99.14% | 61 | 0.86% | 6,984 | 98.28% | 7,106 |
| Franklin | 10,044 | 99.22% | 79 | 0.78% | 9,965 | 98.44% | 10,123 |
| Geneva | 10,866 | 99.32% | 74 | 0.68% | 10,792 | 98.65% | 10,940 |
| Greene | 969 | 96.71% | 33 | 3.29% | 936 | 93.41% | 1,002 |
| Hale | 3,478 | 97.61% | 85 | 2.39% | 3,393 | 95.23% | 3,563 |
| Henry | 6,987 | 98.67% | 94 | 1.33% | 6,893 | 97.35% | 7,081 |
| Houston | 34,181 | 97.84% | 754 | 2.16% | 33,427 | 95.68% | 34,935 |
| Jackson | 19,426 | 99.26% | 145 | 0.74% | 19,281 | 98.52% | 19,571 |
| Jefferson | 149,011 | 94.76% | 8,233 | 5.24% | 140,778 | 89.53% | 157,244 |
| Lamar | 5,886 | 99.24% | 45 | 0.76% | 5,841 | 98.48% | 5,931 |
| Lauderdale | 33,320 | 98.41% | 540 | 1.59% | 32,780 | 96.81% | 33,860 |
| Lawrence | 12,780 | 99.21% | 102 | 0.79% | 12,678 | 98.42% | 12,882 |
| Lee | 50,393 | 97.07% | 1,522 | 2.93% | 48,871 | 94.14% | 51,915 |
| Limestone | 39,785 | 97.07% | 1,201 | 2.93% | 38,584 | 94.14% | 40,986 |
| Lowndes | 1,839 | 96.28% | 71 | 3.72% | 1,768 | 92.57% | 1,910 |
| Macon | 2,126 | 91.92% | 187 | 8.08% | 1,939 | 83.83% | 2,313 |
| Madison | 121,136 | 95.42% | 5,810 | 4.58% | 115,326 | 90.85% | 126,946 |
| Marengo | 4,976 | 97.95% | 104 | 2.05% | 4,872 | 95.91% | 5,080 |
| Marion | 11,969 | 99.27% | 88 | 0.73% | 11,881 | 98.54% | 12,057 |
| Marshall | 34,442 | 98.76% | 431 | 1.24% | 34,011 | 97.53% | 34,873 |
| Mobile | 108,416 | 96.36% | 4,092 | 3.64% | 104,324 | 92.73% | 112,508 |
| Monroe | 6,029 | 98.50% | 92 | 1.50% | 5,937 | 96.99% | 6,121 |
| Montgomery | 37,537 | 93.20% | 2,737 | 6.80% | 34,800 | 86.41% | 40,274 |
| Morgan | 41,426 | 98.49% | 634 | 1.51% | 40,792 | 96.99% | 42,060 |
| Perry | 1,313 | 97.77% | 30 | 2.23% | 1,283 | 95.53% | 1,343 |
| Pickens | 5,640 | 98.76% | 71 | 1.24% | 5,569 | 97.51% | 5,711 |
| Pike | 8,790 | 97.86% | 192 | 2.14% | 8,598 | 95.72% | 8,982 |
| Randolph | 8,889 | 98.91% | 98 | 1.09% | 8,791 | 97.82% | 8,987 |
| Russell | 11,539 | 96.01% | 480 | 3.99% | 11,059 | 92.01% | 12,019 |
| Shelby | 85,086 | 96.79% | 2,821 | 3.21% | 82,265 | 93.58% | 87,907 |
| St. Clair | 35,900 | 98.30% | 622 | 1.70% | 35,278 | 96.59% | 36,522 |
| Sumter | 1,668 | 97.26% | 47 | 2.74% | 1,621 | 94.52% | 1,715 |
| Talladega | 23,085 | 97.90% | 496 | 2.10% | 22,589 | 95.79% | 23,581 |
| Tallapoosa | 14,981 | 98.33% | 255 | 1.67% | 14,726 | 96.65% | 15,236 |
| Tuscaloosa | 55,034 | 96.81% | 1,816 | 3.19% | 53,218 | 93.61% | 56,850 |
| Walker | 25,346 | 98.68% | 340 | 1.32% | 25,006 | 97.35% | 25,686 |
| Washington | 6,378 | 99.10% | 58 | 0.90% | 6,320 | 98.20% | 6,436 |
| Wilcox | 1,821 | 98.27% | 32 | 1.73% | 1,789 | 96.55% | 1,853 |
| Winston | 10,008 | 99.48% | 52 | 0.52% | 9,956 | 98.97% | 10,060 |
| Totals | 1,538,888 | 97.34% | 42,061 | 2.66% | 1,496,827 | 94.68% | 1,580,949 |
