= Alabama's 3rd House of Representatives district =

American legislative district

Alabama's 3rd State House of Representatives district
Representative
Andrew Sorrell; R–Muscle Shoals
- Demographics: 77.2% White; 19.1% Black; 0.5% Asian; 0.5% Native American; 0.0% Hawaiian/Pacific Islander; 1.1% Other
- Population (2010) • Voting age • Citizens of voting age: 42,348; 18; 77.9%

Alabama's 3rd House of Representatives district is one of 105 districts in the Alabama House of Representatives. Its most recent representative was Andrew Sorrell prior to his election as State Auditor of Alabama. It was created in 1966 and encompasses parts of Colbert, Lauderdale and Lawrence counties. As of the 2010 census, the district has a population of 42,348, with 77.9% being of legal voting age.

== Representatives ==
Representative	Party	Term start	Term end	Electoral history	Represented counties
District created			November 9, 1966		
John D. Snodgrass	Democratic	November 9, 1966	November 4, 1970	Elected in 1966	Madison
Tom Jones	Democratic	November 9, 1966	November 4, 1970	Elected in 1966	Madison
Harry L. Pennington	Democratic	November 9, 1966	November 4, 1970	Elected in 1966	Madison
Eugene M. McLain	Democratic	November 9, 1966	November 4, 1970	Elected in 1966	Madison
Shelby A. Laxson	Democratic	November 9, 1966	November 4, 1970	Elected in 1966	Madison
Hartwell B. Lutz	Democratic	November 4, 1970	November 6, 1974	Elected in 1970	Madison
Charles E. Grainger	Democratic	November 4, 1970	November 6, 1974	Elected in 1970	Madison
Bill G. King	Democratic	November 4, 1970	November 6, 1974	Elected in 1970	Madison
Glenn H. Hearn	Democratic	November 4, 1970	November 6, 1974	Elected in 1970	Madison
Douglas V. Hale	Republican	November 4, 1970	November 6, 1974	Elected in 1970	Madison
Tom C. Coburn	Democratic	November 6, 1974	November 8, 1978	Elected in 1974; Re-elected in 1978	Colbert, Franklin, Lauderdale
Tom C. Coburn	Democratic	November 8, 1978	November 3, 1982	Elected in 1974; Re-elected in 1978	Colbert, Franklin, Lauderdale
J. W. Goodwin	Democratic	November 3, 1982	November 9, 1983	Elected in 1982; Re-elected in 1983; Re-elected in 1986; Re-elected in 1990	Colbert, Lauderdale
J. W. Goodwin	Democratic	November 9, 1983	November 5, 1986	Elected in 1982; Re-elected in 1983; Re-elected in 1986; Re-elected in 1990	Colbert, Lauderdale
J. W. Goodwin	Democratic	November 5, 1986	November 7, 1990	Elected in 1982; Re-elected in 1983; Re-elected in 1986; Re-elected in 1990	Colbert, Lauderdale
J. W. Goodwin	Democratic	November 7, 1990	November 9, 1994	Elected in 1982; Re-elected in 1983; Re-elected in 1986; Re-elected in 1990	Colbert, Lauderdale
Marcel Black	Democratic	November 9, 1994	November 4, 1998	Elected in 1994; Re-elected in 1998; Re-elected in 2002; Re-elected in 2006; Re-elected in 2010; Re-elected in 2014	Colbert
Marcel Black	Democratic	November 4, 1998	November 6, 2002	Elected in 1994; Re-elected in 1998; Re-elected in 2002; Re-elected in 2006; Re-elected in 2010; Re-elected in 2014	Colbert
Marcel Black	Democratic	November 6, 2002	November 8, 2006	Elected in 1994; Re-elected in 1998; Re-elected in 2002; Re-elected in 2006; Re-elected in 2010; Re-elected in 2014	Colbert
Marcel Black	Democratic	November 8, 2006	November 3, 2010	Elected in 1994; Re-elected in 1998; Re-elected in 2002; Re-elected in 2006; Re-elected in 2010; Re-elected in 2014	Colbert
Marcel Black	Democratic	November 3, 2010	November 5, 2014	Elected in 1994; Re-elected in 1998; Re-elected in 2002; Re-elected in 2006; Re-elected in 2010; Re-elected in 2014	Colbert
Marcel Black	Democratic	November 5, 2014	November 7, 2018	Elected in 1994; Re-elected in 1998; Re-elected in 2002; Re-elected in 2006; Re-elected in 2010; Re-elected in 2014	Colbert
Andrew Sorrell	Republican	November 7, 2018	November 9, 2022	Elected in 2018	Colbert, Lauderdale, Lawrence

== General elections ==
Year	Democratic			Republican			Other		
Year	Candidate	Votes	%	Candidate	Votes	%	Candidate	Votes	%
1966; Places; 1-5	√Tom Jones	19,949	11.90	James L. Carpenter	14,079	8.40	None		
1966; Places; 1-5	√John D. Snodgrass	20,712	12.36	Jim McCown	12,737	7.60	None		
1966; Places; 1-5	√Harry L. Pennington	20,286	12.11	W. E. Brewer	13,110	7.82	None		
1966; Places; 1-5	√Eugene M. McLain	19,227	11.47	Glenn F. Manning	14,411	8.60	None		
1966; Places; 1-5	√Shelby A. Lawson	18,503	11.04	Lawrence Judd	14,568	8.69	None		
1970; Places; 1-5	√Hartwell B. Lutz	30,604	92.07	Richard Perkins	2,634	7.93	None		
1970; Places; 1-5	√Charles E. Grainger	[data missing]		William Griffin	[data missing]		None		
