= Jeremy Gray (politician) =

American politician, fitness instructor, and football player

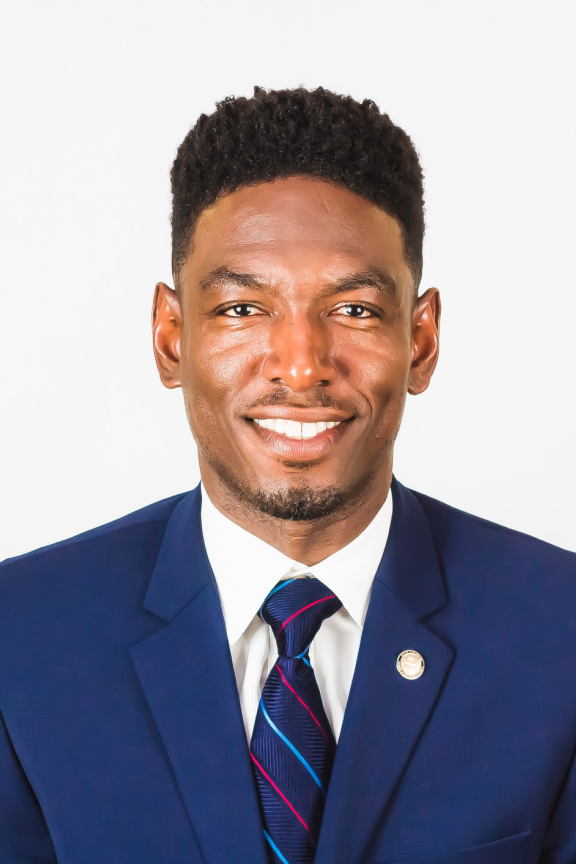

Member of the Alabama House of Representatives from the 83rd district
- Incumbent
- Assumed office November 7, 2018
- Preceded by: George Bandy

Personal details
- Born: Jeremy Askew Gray; October 8, 1985 (age 41) Opelika, Alabama, U.S.
- Party: Democratic
- Education: North Carolina State University (BS); Auburn University (MBA)
- Football career

Profile
- Position: Cornerback

Career information
- High school: Opelika (AL)
- College: NC State

Career history
- Tulsa Talons (2011); Kansas City Command (2011); Saskatchewan Roughriders (2015)

Jeremy Askew Gray (born October 8, 1985) is an American politician, fitness instructor, and retired football player serving as a Democratic member of the Alabama House of Representatives from the 83rd district. He assumed office on November 7, 2018.

== Early life and education ==
Born in Opelika, Alabama, Gray graduated from Opelika High School in 2004 where he was a star football and track athlete. He earned a Bachelor of Science degree in sports management from North Carolina State University. As an undergraduate, Gray was a defensive back for the NC State Wolfpack football team from 2005 to 2008. He was a two-year starter and made 61 solo tackles as a senior. In 39 career games played, he recorded 132 total tackles, seven interceptions, and one quarterback sack.

== Career ==
Gray played for the Tulsa Talons and the Kansas City Command of the Arena Football League in 2011. He recorded his first career interception with the Talons in a loss to the Dallas Vigilantes on March 19. From 2013 to 2015, Gray worked as a fitness instructor in Opelika. In 2015, he played as a cornerback for the Saskatchewan Roughriders. Gray later returned to Alabama, where he has since worked as a personal trainer and yoga instructor. Gray was elected to the Alabama House of Representatives and assumed office on November 7, 2018.

Gray has worked to lift a ban on yoga in Alabama schools.

== Congressional race ==
In November 2023, Gray announced his candidacy to represent Alabama's 2nd congressional district in the U.S. House of Representatives. He is running as a Democrat in the March 5, 2024, primary election.
