= 1819 News =

American conservative news website

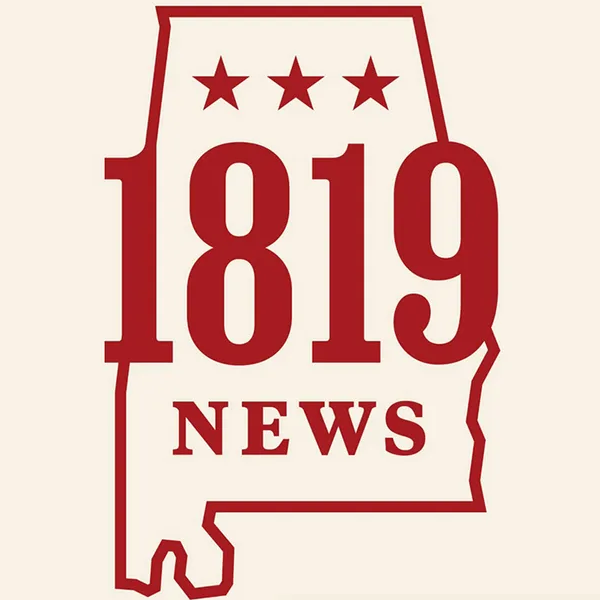
- Website type: News website
- Available in: English
- Headquarters: Birmingham, Alabama, U.S.
- Owners: 1819 News, LLC
- President: Bryan Dawson
- Website: 1819news.com
- Commercial: Yes
- Launched: October 2021
- Current status: Active

1819 News is an American conservative news website that focuses on the state of Alabama. The publication was launched in October 2021 as a subsidiary of the Alabama Policy Institute, but has been an independent non-profit organization since January 2023.

The name 1819 News is a reference to the year that the state of Alabama was admitted to the union.

== History ==
1819 News began as a podcast, the 1819 News Recap, released by the Alabama Policy Institute, a conservative state think tank, in 2020. It started publication as an Alabama statewide news organization in October 2021, under the institute's media wing. Former Alabama state senator Phil Williams, then the institute's chief policy officer, was involved in its creation, as was Alabama Policy Institute president Caleb Crosby. 1819 News president and CEO, Bryan Dawson, said he wanted to focus on the state of Alabama after the 2020 United States presidential election. At its launching, 1819 News was also overseen by a not-for-profit board of directors, separate from the Alabama Policy Institute. The Alabama Policy Institute funded over $1 million to 1819 News in 2021, according to tax filings.

The website became fully independent of the Alabama Policy Institute with the two organizations officially dissociating on December 31, 2022, followed by an announcement of 1819 News's independence in January 2023. 1819 News is now managed by a non-profit LLC of the same name. In February 2023, YouTube suspended the account of 1819 News: The Podcast for violating the website's community guidelines; 1819 News characterized the suspension as "Big Tech censorship" in a follow-up article.

== Staffing ==
1819 News is led by president and CEO Bryan Dawson, who also runs the website's podcasts. Journalist and sportswriter Ray Melick was the website's first editor-in-chief before his retirement in July 2022. Jeff Poor, a radio show host and Breitbart News contributor, was hired as a political editor in February 2022 and became the editor-in-chief in June 2023.

== Reporting ==
1819 News publishes Alabama-focused news, sports, podcasts, opinion pieces and columns. Prior to the website's launch, Dawson said that the goals of 1819 News would include "hold[ing] leaders and politicians accountable while also celebrating the positive things Alabama has to offer". 1819 News has been praised by media executive Steve Bannon, who called it a "fantastic site".

In December 2022, 1819 News published a series of articles reporting on the financial connections of former Republican Alabama House of Representatives speaker Mac McCutcheon, including McCutcheon's links to convicted fraudster John Hornbuckle. In February 2023, 1819 News first reported on leaked recordings of Montgomery mayor Steven Reed making profanity-laden comments about Maxwell Air Force Base.

In November 2023, 1819 News published an article on Bubba Copeland, a Baptist minister and the mayor of Smiths Station, Alabama. The piece included social media posts from Copeland, under a pseudonym, in which he cross-dressed wearing women's clothing and described himself as a "transgender curvy girl". 1819 News also released a follow-up article stating that Copeland had written a violent fictional story featuring a real-life woman and posted pictures of local residents, including minors, without their knowledge; the follow-up article was noted in reporting on the situation by NBC News. Copeland died by suicide on November 3, 2023, two days after the articles were published.

Copeland's suicide received national attention and drew criticism to 1819 News from national and local figures. Lee County Democratic Party chair Jamie Lowe condemned "the use of discriminatory and hateful rhetoric to target the personal lives of individuals". Doug Jones, a former U.S. senator from Alabama, described the website's treatment of Copeland as "sad and disgusting". Conversely, conservative outlets and figures defended 1819 News, including Yellowhammer News and political commentator Apryl Marie Fogel, who wrote in Alabama Today that the "villain" in the story was "not the reporter who brought the story to light or the outlet that published it" and that outside media reporting had failed "to present the complete and graphic details of [Copeland's] abusive behavior". Fogel was subsequently hired by 1819 News and has served as a commentator there since May 2024.

In early 2025, 1819 News ran a series of articles by Apryl Marie Fogel criticizing Samford University for what the website pejoratively described as "woke creep" at the university, referencing its diversity, equity, and inclusion policies, as well as proposed real estate developments that would permit the sale of alcohol. The articles reportedly prompted a response from university president Beck A. Taylor; Fogel claimed that Taylor called the 1819 News stories "unfair, out of context, and at times completely false" in an email to the university's board of trustees.
