= 2026 Alabama state legislative special elections =

Three special elections to the Alabama Legislature were held in 2026.

== House District 13 ==
2026 Alabama House of Representatives District 13 special election
- January 13, 2026
Candidate	Greg Barnes
Party	Republican
Popular vote	Unopposed
Alabama state representative before election
Matt Woods
Republican
Elected Alabama state representative
Greg Barnes
Republican

The 2026 Alabama House of Representatives District 13 special election will be held on January 13, 2026, to elect the representative for Alabama's 13th House of Representatives district following the resignation of incumbent representative Matt Woods after he was elected to the Alabama Senate. The primary election will be held on September 30, 2025.

=== Background ===
Incumbent representative Matt Woods was elected to the state senate in a special election on June 24, 2025.

Kay Ivey officially called the election on July 8, 2025. Major party candidates have until July 15 to qualify, while third-party and independent candidates have until September 30.

=== Republican primary ===
==== Candidates ====
===== Declared =====
- Greg Barnes, candidate for this seat in 2022
- Dustin Beaty, community advocate

===== Disqualified =====
- Mike Elliott, educator

==== Endorsements ====
Mike Elliott

Organizations

- Alabama Farmers Federation

===== Results =====
Republican primary
Party	Candidate	Votes	%
Republican	Greg Barnes	2,500	69.19
Republican	Dustin Beaty	1,113	30.81
Total votes		3,613	100.00

=== General election ===
==== Results ====
2026 Alabama's 38th House of Representatives district special election
Party	Candidate	Votes	%
Republican	Kristin Nelson	Unopposed	
Total votes		2,191	100.0%
Republican hold			

== House District 38 ==
2026 Alabama House of Representatives District 38 special election
- February 3, 2026
Candidate	Kristin Nelson	Hazel Floyd
Party	Republican	Democratic
Popular vote	1,860	331
Percentage	84.89%	15.11%
Alabama state representative before election
Debbie Wood
Republican
Elected Alabama state representative
Kristin Nelson
Republican

The 2026 Alabama House of Representatives District 38 special election was held on February 3, 2026, to elect the representative for Alabama's 38th House of Representatives district following the resignation of incumbent representative Debbie Wood. The primary election was held on October 21, 2025, and the primary runoff was held on November 18.

=== Background ===
Incumbent representative Debbie Wood was first elected in 2018. She announced her resignation on June 2, 2024, as she is relocating out of the district after her husband accepted a new job in Florida. She officially resigned on July 31.

=== Democratic primary ===
==== Candidates ====
===== Nominee =====
- Hazel Floyd

=== Republican primary ===
==== Candidates ====
===== Nominee =====
- Kristin Nelson, Chambers County Republican Party chair

===== Eliminated in runoff =====
- Garrett Dixon, farmer

===== Eliminated in primary =====
- Micah Messer, law enforcement officer and business owner

==== Endorsements ====
Garrett Dixon

Statewide officials

- Will Ainsworth, Lieutenant Governor of Alabama

==== Results ====
Republican primary
Party	Candidate	Votes	%
Republican	Kristin Nelson	1,226	46.69
Republican	Garrett Dixon	874	33.28
Republican	Micah J. Messer	526	20.03
Total votes		2,626	100.00

Primary results by county
Town	Dixon		Nelson		Messer		Total
Chambers	224	15.65%	942	65.83%	265	18.62%	1,431
Lee	650	54.39%	284	23.77%	261	21.84%	1,195

==== Runoff ====
===== Results =====
Republican primary runoff
Party	Candidate	Votes	%
Republican	Kristin Nelson	1,609	54.45
Republican	Garrett Dixon	1,346	45.55
Total votes		2,955	100.00

=== General election ===
==== Results ====
2026 Alabama's 38th House of Representatives district special election
Party	Candidate	Votes	%
Republican	Kristin Nelson	1,860	84.89%
Democratic	Hazel Floyd	331	15.11%
Total votes		2,191	100.0%
Republican hold			

== House District 63 ==
2026 Alabama House of Representatives District 63 special election
- January 13, 2026
Candidate	Norman Crow	Judith Taylor
Party	Republican	Democratic
Popular vote	1,112	613
Percentage	64.5%	35.5%
Alabama state representative before election
Cynthia Almond
Republican
Elected Alabama state representative
Norman Crow
Republican

The 2026 Alabama House of Representatives District 63 special election was held on January 13, 2026, to elect the representative for Alabama's 63rd House of Representatives district following the appointment of incumbent representative Cynthia Almond to the Alabama Public Service Commission.

=== Background ===
Incumbent representative Cynthia Almond was first elected to the Alabama House of Representatives in a 2021 special election. She was appointed as the president of the Alabama Public Service Commission on June 6, 2025, to replace Twinkle Andress Cavanaugh, who resigned to serve as the USDA state director for rural development. She took office on June 16, and resigned her seat on the same day.

Kay Ivey officially called the election on June 16, 2025. Major party candidates had until June 23 to qualify, while third-party and independent candidates have until September 30.

==== Past election results ====
Year	Winner			Opponents			Others			Margin	Ref
2024 pres	Donald Trump (R)	7,638	57.35%	Kamala Harris (D)	5,405	40.58%	Others	276	2.07%	R+16.77	
2022	Cynthia Almond (R, inc.)	5,541	66.15%	Samuel Adams (D)	2,827	33.75%	Write-in	8	0.10%	R+32.40	
2021–22 sp	Cynthia Almond (R)	Unopp.								R+100	
2020 pres	Donald Trump (R)	7,837	55.39%	Joe Biden (D)	5,999	42.40%	Others	312	2.21%	R+12.99	

=== Republican primary ===
Qualifying for the Republican primary officially began on June 20, 2025, and will end on June 23. Norman Crow won the nomination unopposed after no other candidate filed.

==== Candidates ====
===== Nominee =====
- Norman Crow, member of the Tuscaloosa city council from the 3rd district

==== Endorsements ====
Norman Crow

Organizations

- Alabama Forestry Association
- Business Council of Alabama
- Manufacture Alabama

=== Democratic primary ===
==== Candidates ====
===== Nominee =====
- Judith Taylor, chair of the Tuscaloosa County Democratic Party

=== General election ===
==== Results ====
2026 Alabama House of Representatives District 63 special election
Party	Candidate	Votes	%	±%
Republican	Norman Crow	1,112	64.46	−1.69
Democratic	Judith Taylor	613	35.54	+1.79
Write-in		0	0.00	
Total votes		1,725	100.00	
