= 2018 Alabama House of Representatives election =

- November 6, 2018

All 105 seats in the Alabama House of Representatives 53 seats needed for a majority
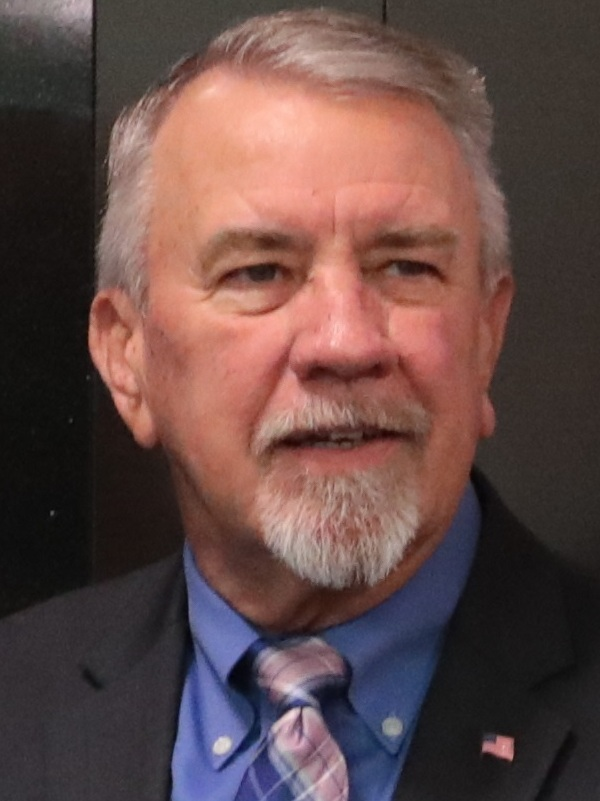

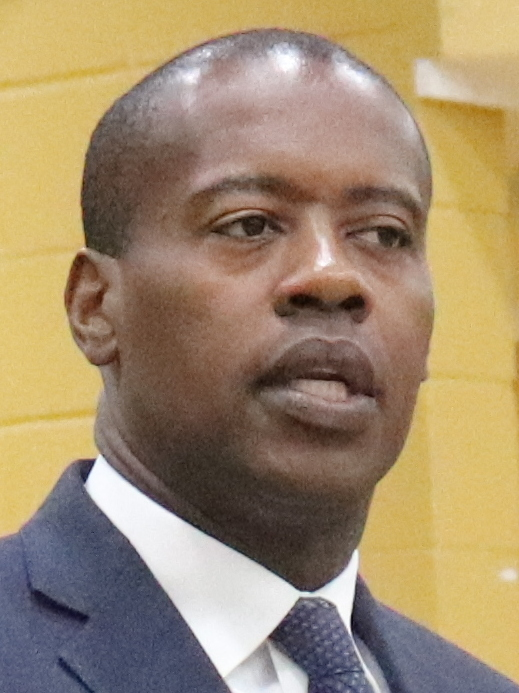
	Majority party	Minority party
Leader	Mac McCutcheon	Anthony Daniels
Party	Republican	Democratic
Leader since	August 15, 2016	February 22, 2017
Leader's seat	25th	53rd
Last election	72	33
Seats won	77	28
Seat change	▲5	▼5
Popular vote	952,859	554,571
Percentage	62.73%	36.51%
Swing	▼2.28%	▲2.09%
- Results: Democratic hold Republican hold Republican gain
Speaker before election
Mac McCutcheon
Republican
Elected Speaker
Mac McCutcheon
Republican

The 2018 Alabama House of Representatives elections were held on November 6, 2018, as part of the biennial United States elections. All 105 of Alabama's state representatives were up for reelection. In Alabama, members of both the House of Representatives and the Senate serve four-year terms, running in years corresponding with presidential midterm elections.

The Republican Party picked up five seats in the chamber, despite national success for the Democratic Party throughout the United States. Several factors contributed to this. Four of the gains made by Republicans were in rural districts with longtime incumbents who chose to retire in 2018 rather than run for reelection. A lack of strong incumbents allowed the Republicans, whose support among rural whites has greatly strengthened in Alabama since the 1990s, to pick up most of these seats with relative ease. Additionally, the Alabama Democratic Party was heavily disorganized and internally divided, leaving many candidates in competitive districts to run without a meaningful party apparatus behind them. President Donald Trump's popularity in the state (which he won by 28 points in 2016) likely also contributed to increased enthusiasm among Republicans. While Democrats did increase their share of the popular vote from 2014, it was more a function of several Democratic-seats being left uncontested than an increase in statewide support.

The results were a major disappointment for Democrats, who less than a year earlier had won a fiercely fought the U.S. Senate race in Alabama. As a result of these defeats the state party began a period of reform, with State Representative Christopher J. England replacing Nancy Worley as chair of the party. The results also highlighted the dramatic racial divide among Alabama's political parties—after this election, only one Democratic representative (Neil Rafferty) in the chamber was white, while no Republican representatives were black.

== Close races ==
Seats where the margin of victory was under 10%:

1. District 3, 5.04% (gain)
2. District 65, 5.67% (gain)
3. District 85, 7.71%
4. District 47, 8.57%

== Predictions ==
Source	Ranking	As of
Governing	Safe R	October 8, 2018

== Election results ==
Before the election, Republicans already held 72–33 supermajority over the Democrats. After the election, Republicans increased it to a margin of 77–28.

=== Overview ===
↓
77	28
Republican	Democratic

Parties	Candidates	Seats				Popular vote		
Parties	Candidates	2014	2018	+/-	Strength	Votes	%	Change
Republican	82	72	77	▲5		952,859	62.22	▼2.79
Democratic	72	33	28	▼5		554,571	36.21	▲1.79
Independent	4	0	0	Steady		9,252	0.60	
Libertarian	2	0	0	Steady		2,236	0.15	Steady
Write-ins		0	0	Steady		12,576	0.82	
Total	156	105	105			1,531,494	100.00	–
Turnout								
Registered								

=== District 1 ===
2018 Alabama's 1st House of Representatives district election
Party	Candidate	Votes	%
Republican	Phillip Pettus (incumbent)	7,348	62.57%
Independent	Bobby James Dolan III	4,336	36.92%
Write-in		60	0.51%
Total votes		11,744	100%
Republican hold			

=== District 2 ===
2018 Alabama's 2nd House of Representatives district election
Party	Candidate	Votes	%
Republican	Lynn Greer (incumbent)	13,056	73.04%
Democratic	Laura Kay Morrow	4,798	26.84%
Write-in		21	0.12%
Total votes		17,875	100%
Republican hold			

=== District 3 ===
2018 Alabama's 3rd House of Representatives district election
Party	Candidate	Votes	%
Republican	Andrew Sorrell	9,448	52.49%
Democratic	Chad Young	8,540	47.45%
Write-in		11	0.06%
Total votes		17,999	100%
Republican gain from Democratic			

=== District 4 ===
2018 Alabama's 4th House of Representatives district election
Party	Candidate	Votes	%
Republican	Parker Moore (incumbent)	11,074	65.05%
Democratic	Jo Ann Cummings	4,325	25.41%
Independent	Polan "Pete" Willis Jr.	1,620	9.51%
Write-in		5	0.03%
Total votes		17,024	100%
Republican hold			

=== District 5 ===
2018 Alabama's 5th House of Representatives district election
Party	Candidate	Votes	%
Republican	Danny Crawford (incumbent)	12,395	72.32%
Democratic	Brian D Williams	4,725	27.57%
Write-in		19	0.11%
Total votes		17,139	100%
Republican hold			

=== District 6 ===
2018 Alabama's 6th House of Representatives district election
Party	Candidate	Votes	%
Republican	Andy Whitt	11,893	95.24%
Write-in		595	4.76%
Total votes		12,488	100%
Republican hold			

=== District 7 ===
2018 Alabama's 7th House of Representatives district election
Party	Candidate	Votes	%
Republican	Proncey Robinson	10,892	75.15%
Democratic	Kenneth A. Brackins	3,592	24.78%
Write-in		9	0.06%
Total votes		14,493	100%
Republican hold			

=== District 8 ===
2018 Alabama's 8th House of Representatives district election
Party	Candidate	Votes	%
Republican	Terri Collins (incumbent)	8,803	61.65%
Democratic	Billy Jackson	5,469	38.30%
Write-in		7	0.05%
Total votes		14,279	100%
Republican hold			

=== District 9 ===
2018 Alabama's 9th House of Representatives district election
Party	Candidate	Votes	%
Republican	Scott Stadthagen	13,297	99.05%
Write-in		127	0.95%
Total votes		13,424	100%
Republican hold			

=== District 10 ===
2018 Alabama's 10th House of Representatives district election
Party	Candidate	Votes	%
Republican	Mike Ball (incumbent)	11,240	53.66%
Democratic	J.B. King	8,565	40.89%
Libertarian	Elijah J. Boyd	1,130	5.39%
Write-in		13	0.06%
Total votes		20,948	100%
Republican hold			

=== District 11 ===
2018 Alabama's 11th House of Representatives district election
Party	Candidate	Votes	%
Republican	Randall Shedd (incumbent)	13,098	99.30%
Write-in		92	0.70%
Total votes		13,190	100.0
Republican hold			

=== District 12 ===
2018 Alabama's 12th House of Representatives district election
Party	Candidate	Votes	%
Republican	Corey Harbison (incumbent)	14,687	99.07%
Write-in		138	0.93%
Total votes		14,825	100%
Republican hold			

=== District 13 ===
2018 Alabama's 13th House of Representatives district election
Party	Candidate	Votes	%
Republican	Connie Rowe (incumbent)	13,755	98.63%
Write-in		191	1.37%
Total votes		13,946	100%
Republican hold			

=== District 14 ===
2018 Alabama's 14th House of Representatives district election
Party	Candidate	Votes	%
Republican	Tim Wadsworth (incumbent)	13,394	98.95%
Write-in		142	1.05%
Total votes		13,536	100%
Republican hold			

=== District 15 ===
2018 Alabama's 15th House of Representatives district election
Party	Candidate	Votes	%
Republican	Allen Farley (incumbent)	14,212	67.11%
Democratic	Suzanna Coleman	6,951	32.82%
Write-in		15	0.07%
Total votes		21,178	100%
Republican hold			

=== District 16 ===
2018 Alabama's 16th House of Representatives district election
Party	Candidate	Votes	%
Republican	Kyle South (incumbent)	14,681	99.07%
Write-in		138	0.93%
Total votes		14,819	100%
Republican hold			

=== District 17 ===
2018 Alabama's 17th House of Representatives district election
Party	Candidate	Votes	%
Republican	Tracy Estes	12,158	98.77%
Write-in		151	1.23%
Total votes		12,309	100%
Republican hold			

=== District 18 ===
2018 Alabama's 18th House of Representatives district election
Party	Candidate	Votes	%
Republican	Jamie Kiel	9,845	71.66%
Democratic	Eddie Britton	3,886	28.28%
Write-in		8	0.06%
Total votes		13,739	100%
Republican gain from Democratic			

=== District 19 ===
2018 Alabama's 19th House of Representatives district election
Party	Candidate	Votes	%
Democratic	Laura Hall (incumbent)	12,675	97.96%
Write-in		264	2.04%
Total votes		12,939	100%
Democratic hold			

=== District 20 ===
2018 Alabama's 20th House of Representatives district election
Party	Candidate	Votes	%
Republican	Howard Sanderford (incumbent)	14,589	63.07%
Democratic	Linda Meigs	8,527	36.87%
Write-in		14	0.06%
Total votes		23,130	100%
Republican hold			

=== District 21 ===
2018 Alabama's 21st House of Representatives district election
Party	Candidate	Votes	%
Republican	Rex Reynolds (incumbent)	13,311	61.31%
Democratic	Terry Jones	8,391	38.65%
Write-in		10	0.05%
Total votes		21,712	100%
Republican hold			

=== District 22 ===
2018 Alabama's 22nd House of Representatives district election
Party	Candidate	Votes	%
Republican	Ritchie Whorton (incumbent)	13,929	98.31%
Write-in		240	1.69%
Total votes		14,169	100%
Republican hold			

=== District 23 ===
2018 Alabama's 23rd House of Representatives district election
Party	Candidate	Votes	%
Republican	Tommy Hanes (incumbent)	10,823	98.86%
Write-in		125	1.14%
Total votes		10,948	100%
Republican hold			

=== District 24 ===
2018 Alabama's 24th House of Representatives district election
Party	Candidate	Votes	%
Republican	Nathaniel Ledbetter (incumbent)	12,394	98.93%
Write-in		134	1.07%
Total votes		12,528	100%
Republican hold			

=== District 25 ===
2018 Alabama's 25th House of Representatives district election
Party	Candidate	Votes	%
Republican	Mac McCutcheon (incumbent)	14,974	94.90%
Write-in		805	5.10%
Total votes		15,779	100%
Republican hold			

=== District 26 ===
2018 Alabama's 26th House of Representatives district election
Party	Candidate	Votes	%
Republican	Kerry Rich (incumbent)	8,948	98.55%
Write-in		132	1.45%
Total votes		9,080	100%
Republican hold			

=== District 27 ===
2018 Alabama's 27th House of Representatives district election
Party	Candidate	Votes	%
Republican	Wes Kitchens	13,245	84.27%
Democratic	Bill Jones	2,456	15.63%
Write-in		17	0.11%
Total votes		15,718	100%
Republican hold			

=== District 28 ===
2018 Alabama's 28th House of Representatives district election
Party	Candidate	Votes	%
Republican	Gil Isbell	7,091	55.21%
Democratic	Kyle Pierce	5,731	44.62%
Write-in		21	0.16%
Total votes		12,843	100%
Republican gain from Democratic			

=== District 29 ===
2018 Alabama's 29th House of Representatives district election
Party	Candidate	Votes	%
Republican	Becky Nordgren (incumbent)	11,528	79.10%
Democratic	Jared Vaughn	3,032	20.80%
Write-in		14	0.10%
Total votes		14,574	100%
Republican hold			

=== District 30 ===
2018 Alabama's 30th House of Representatives district election
Party	Candidate	Votes	%
Republican	B. Craig Lipscomb	13,779	82.41%
Democratic	Jared Vaughn	2,931	17.53%
Write-in		10	0.06%
Total votes		16,720	100%
Republican hold			

=== District 31 ===
2018 Alabama's 31st House of Representatives district election
Party	Candidate	Votes	%
Republican	Mike Holmes (incumbent)	14,323	98.61%
Write-in		202	1.39%
Total votes		14,525	100%
Republican hold			

=== District 32 ===
2018 Alabama's 32nd House of Representatives district election
Party	Candidate	Votes	%
Democratic	Barbara Boyd (incumbent)	7,761	63.16%
Republican	James Allen Lloyd	4,513	36.73%
Write-in		13	0.11%
Total votes		12,287	100%
Democratic hold			

=== District 33 ===
2018 Alabama's 33rd House of Representatives district election
Party	Candidate	Votes	%
Republican	Ronald Johnson (incumbent)	10,155	67.25%
Democratic	Scott Brewer	4,928	32.64%
Write-in		17	0.11%
Total votes		15,100	100%
Republican hold			

=== District 34 ===
2018 Alabama's 34th House of Representatives district election
Party	Candidate	Votes	%
Republican	David Standridge (incumbent)	13,331	99.34%
Write-in		88	0.66%
Total votes		13,419	100%
Republican hold			

=== District 35 ===
2018 Alabama's 35th House of Representatives district election
Party	Candidate	Votes	%
Republican	Steve Hurst (incumbent)	11,567	98.17%
Write-in		216	1.83%
Total votes		11,783	100%
Republican hold			

=== District 36 ===
2018 Alabama's 36th House of Representatives district election
Party	Candidate	Votes	%
Republican	Randy Wood (incumbent)	11,399	72.75%
Democratic	Nicki Arnold-Swindle	4,256	27.16%
Write-in		13	0.08%
Total votes		15,668	100%
Republican hold			

=== District 37 ===
2018 Alabama's 37th House of Representatives district election
Party	Candidate	Votes	%
Republican	Bob Fincher (incumbent)	11,153	71.16%
Democratic	Charlotte A. Clark-Frieson	4,505	28.74%
Write-in		16	0.10%
Total votes		15,674	100%
Republican hold			

=== District 38 ===
2018 Alabama's 38th House of Representatives district election
Party	Candidate	Votes	%
Republican	Debbie Hamby Wood	11,151	69.15%
Democratic	Brian McGee	4,944	30.66%
Write-in		31	0.19%
Total votes		16,126	100%
Republican hold			

=== District 39 ===
2018 Alabama's 39th House of Representatives district election
Party	Candidate	Votes	%
Republican	Ginny Shaver	11,585	98.76%
Write-in		146	1.24%
Total votes		11,731	100%
Republican gain from Democratic			

=== District 40 ===
2018 Alabama's 40th House of Representatives district election
Party	Candidate	Votes	%
Republican	K. L. Brown (incumbent)	11,188	74.50%
Democratic	Pamela Jean Howard	3,819	25.43%
Write-in		10	0.07%
Total votes		15,017	100%
Republican hold			

=== District 41 ===
2018 Alabama's 41st House of Representatives district election
Party	Candidate	Votes	%
Republican	Corley Ellis (incumbent)	14,088	75.31%
Democratic	Emily Anne Marcum	4,610	24.64%
Write-in		9	0.05%
Total votes		18,707	100%
Republican hold			

=== District 42 ===
2018 Alabama's 42nd House of Representatives district election
Party	Candidate	Votes	%
Republican	Jimmy Martin (incumbent)	12,412	98.74%
Write-in		159	1.26%
Total votes		12,571	100%
Republican hold			

=== District 43 ===
2018 Alabama's 43rd House of Representatives district election
Party	Candidate	Votes	%
Republican	Arnold Mooney (incumbent)	15,035	71.96%
Democratic	Carin Mayo	5,847	27.99%
Write-in		11	0.05%
Total votes		20,893	100%
Republican hold			

=== District 44 ===
2018 Alabama's 44th House of Representatives district election
Party	Candidate	Votes	%
Republican	Danny Garrett (incumbent)	14,597	96.24%
Write-in		570	3.76%
Total votes		15,167	100%
Republican hold			

=== District 45 ===
2018 Alabama's 45th House of Representatives district election
Party	Candidate	Votes	%
Republican	Dickie Drake (incumbent)	13,669	65.61%
Democratic	Jenn Gray	7,148	34.31%
Write-in		16	0.08%
Total votes		20,833	100%
Republican hold			

=== District 46 ===
2018 Alabama's 46th House of Representatives district election
Party	Candidate	Votes	%
Republican	David Faulkner (incumbent)	13,341	61.23%
Democratic	Felicia Stewart	8,445	38.76%
Write-in		4	0.02%
Total votes		21,790	100%
Republican hold			

=== District 47 ===
2018 Alabama's 47th House of Representatives district election
Party	Candidate	Votes	%
Republican	David Wheeler	9,170	54.26%
Democratic	Jim Toomey	7,721	45.69%
Write-in		8	0.05%
Total votes		16,899	100%
Republican hold			

=== District 48 ===
2018 Alabama's 48th House of Representatives district election
Party	Candidate	Votes	%
Republican	Jim Carns (incumbent)	14,789	65.33%
Democratic	Alli Summerford	7,832	34.60%
Write-in		15	0.07%
Total votes		22,636	100%
Republican hold			

=== District 49 ===
2018 Alabama's 49th House of Representatives district election
Party	Candidate	Votes	%
Republican	April Weaver (incumbent)	10,795	97.21%
Write-in		310	2.79%
Total votes		11,105	100%
Republican hold			

=== District 50 ===
2018 Alabama's 50th House of Representatives district election
Party	Candidate	Votes	%
Republican	Jim Hill (incumbent)	14,412	98.25%
Write-in		257	1.75%
Total votes		14,669	100%
Republican hold			

=== District 51 ===
2018 Alabama's 51st House of Representatives district election
Party	Candidate	Votes	%
Republican	Allen Treadaway (incumbent)	15,390	82.88%
Democratic	Veronica R. Johnson	3,174	17.09%
Write-in		6	0.03%
Total votes		18,570	100%
Republican hold			

=== District 52 ===
2018 Alabama's 52nd House of Representatives district election
Party	Candidate	Votes	%
Democratic	John Rogers (incumbent)	13,284	98.74%
Write-in		169	1.26%
Total votes		13,453	100%
Democratic hold			

=== District 53 ===
2018 Alabama's 53rd House of Representatives district election
Party	Candidate	Votes	%
Democratic	Anthony Daniels (incumbent)	8,375	98.47%
Write-in		130	1.53%
Total votes		8,505	100%
Democratic hold			

=== District 54 ===
2018 Alabama's 54th House of Representatives district election
Party	Candidate	Votes	%
Democratic	Neil Rafferty	13,287	89.92%
Independent	Joseph Casper Baker III	1,436	9.72%
Write-in		53	0.36%
Total votes		14,776	100%
Democratic hold			

=== District 55 ===
2018 Alabama's 55th House of Representatives district election
Party	Candidate	Votes	%
Democratic	Rod Scott (incumbent)	13,109	99.39%
Write-in		80	0.61%
Total votes		13,189	100%
Democratic hold			

=== District 56 ===
2018 Alabama's 56th House of Representatives district election
Party	Candidate	Votes	%
Democratic	Louise Alexander (incumbent)	13,769	98.10%
Write-in		266	1.90%
Total votes		14,035	100%
Democratic hold			

=== District 57 ===
2018 Alabama's 57th House of Representatives district election
Party	Candidate	Votes	%
Democratic	Merika Coleman (incumbent)	12,831	98.08%
Write-in		251	1.92%
Total votes		13,082	100%
Democratic hold			

=== District 58 ===
2018 Alabama's 58th House of Representatives district election
Party	Candidate	Votes	%
Democratic	Rolanda Hollis (incumbent)	12,498	98.74%
Write-in		159	1.26%
Total votes		12,657	100%
Democratic hold			

=== District 59 ===
2018 Alabama's 59th House of Representatives district election
Party	Candidate	Votes	%
Democratic	Mary Moore (incumbent)	12,036	99.05%
Write-in		116	0.95%
Total votes		12,152	100%
Democratic hold			

=== District 60 ===
2018 Alabama's 60th House of Representatives district election
Party	Candidate	Votes	%
Democratic	Juandalynn Givan (incumbent)	14,432	98.46%
Write-in		225	1.54%
Total votes		14,657	100%
Democratic hold			

=== District 61 ===
2018 Alabama's 61st House of Representatives district election
Party	Candidate	Votes	%
Republican	Rodney Sullivan	12,407	65.59%
Democratic	Thomas "Tommy" Hyche	6,491	34.32%
Write-in		17	0.09%
Total votes		18,915	100%
Republican hold			

=== District 62 ===
2018 Alabama's 62nd House of Representatives district election
Party	Candidate	Votes	%
Republican	Rich Wingo (incumbent)	11,282	68.12%
Democratic	Will Benton	5,265	31.79%
Write-in		15	0.09%
Total votes		16,562	100%
Republican hold			

=== District 63 ===
2018 Alabama's 63rd House of Representatives district election
Party	Candidate	Votes	%
Republican	Bill Poole (incumbent)	10,239	96.13%
Write-in		412	3.87%
Total votes		10,651	100%
Republican hold			

=== District 64 ===
2018 Alabama's 64th House of Representatives district election
Party	Candidate	Votes	%
Republican	Harry Shiver (incumbent)	13,030	76.32%
Democratic	Amber Selman-Lynn	4,022	23.56%
Write-in		20	0.12%
Total votes		17,072	100%
Republican hold			

=== District 65 ===
2018 Alabama's 65th House of Representatives district election
Party	Candidate	Votes	%
Republican	Brett Easterbrook	10,095	52.80%
Democratic	Elaine Beech (incumbent)	9,010	47.13%
Write-in		13	0.07%
Total votes		19,118	100%
Republican gain from Democratic			

=== District 66 ===
2018 Alabama's 66th House of Representatives district election
Party	Candidate	Votes	%
Republican	Alan Baker (incumbent)	10,431	72.22%
Democratic	Susan E. Smith	4,008	27.75%
Write-in		5	0.03%
Total votes		14,444	100%
Republican hold			

=== District 67 ===
2018 Alabama's 67th House of Representatives district election
Party	Candidate	Votes	%
Democratic	Prince Chestnut (incumbent)	11,635	98.30%
Write-in		201	1.70%
Total votes		11,836	100%
Democratic hold			

=== District 68 ===
2018 Alabama's 68th House of Representatives district election
Party	Candidate	Votes	%
Democratic	Thomas Jackson (incumbent)	10,382	97.93%
Write-in		219	2.07%
Total votes		10,601	100%
Democratic hold			

=== District 69 ===
2018 Alabama's 69th House of Representatives district election
Party	Candidate	Votes	%
Democratic	Kelvin Lawrence (incumbent)	12,867	98.24%
Write-in		231	1.76%
Total votes		13,098	100%
Democratic hold			

=== District 70 ===
2018 Alabama's 70th House of Representatives district election
Party	Candidate	Votes	%
Democratic	Christopher J. England (incumbent)	11,541	98.57%
Write-in		167	1.43%
Total votes		11,708	100%
Democratic hold			

=== District 71 ===
2018 Alabama's 71st House of Representatives district election
Party	Candidate	Votes	%
Democratic	Artis J. McCampbell (incumbent)	12,400	98.24%
Write-in		222	1.76%
Total votes		12,622	100%
Democratic hold			

=== District 72 ===
2018 Alabama's 72nd House of Representatives district election
Party	Candidate	Votes	%
Democratic	Ralph Anthony Howard (incumbent)	12,811	98.75%
Write-in		162	1.25%
Total votes		12,973	100%
Democratic hold			

=== District 73 ===
2018 Alabama's 73rd House of Representatives district election
Party	Candidate	Votes	%
Republican	Matt Fridy (incumbent)	12,913	69.07%
Democratic	Jack Jacobs	5,772	30.87%
Write-in		10	0.05%
Total votes		18,695	100%
Republican hold			

=== District 74 ===
2018 Alabama's 74th House of Representatives district election
Party	Candidate	Votes	%
Republican	Dimitri Polizos (incumbent)	9,449	60.47%
Democratic	Rayford Mack	6,160	39.42%
Write-in		17	0.11%
Total votes		15,626	100%
Republican hold			

=== District 75 ===
2018 Alabama's 75th House of Representatives district election
Party	Candidate	Votes	%
Republican	Reed Ingram (incumbent)	13,229	96.90%
Write-in		423	3.10%
Total votes		13,652	100%
Republican hold			

=== District 76 ===
2018 Alabama's 76th House of Representatives district election
Party	Candidate	Votes	%
Democratic	Thad McClammy (incumbent)	11,681	99.40%
Write-in		70	0.60%
Total votes		11,751	100%
Democratic hold			

=== District 77 ===
2018 Alabama's 77th House of Representatives district election
Party	Candidate	Votes	%
Democratic	Tashina Morris	10,638	98.64%
Write-in		147	1.36%
Total votes		10,785	100%
Democratic hold			

=== District 78 ===
2018 Alabama's 78th House of Representatives district election
Party	Candidate	Votes	%
Democratic	Kirk Hatcher	9,506	83.42%
Independent	Tijuanna Adetunji	1,860	16.32%
Write-in		30	0.26%
Total votes		11,396	100%
Democratic hold			

=== District 79 ===
2018 Alabama's 79th House of Representatives district election
Party	Candidate	Votes	%
Republican	Joe Lovvorn (incumbent)	9,717	58.05%
Democratic	Mary Wynne Kling	7,015	41.91%
Write-in		8	0.05%
Total votes		16,740	100%
Republican hold			

=== District 80 ===
2018 Alabama's 80th House of Representatives district election
Party	Candidate	Votes	%
Republican	Chris Blackshear (incumbent)	8,506	71.32%
Democratic	Christopher F. "Apostle" Davis	3,407	28.57%
Write-in		14	0.02%
Total votes		11,927	100%
Republican hold			

=== District 81 ===
2018 Alabama's 81st House of Representatives district election
Party	Candidate	Votes	%
Republican	Ed Oliver	12,823	73.16%
Democratic	Jeremy "J.J." Jeffcoat	4,697	26.80%
Write-in		8	0.05%
Total votes		17,528	100%
Republican hold			

=== District 82 ===
2018 Alabama's 82nd House of Representatives district election
Party	Candidate	Votes	%
Democratic	Pebblin Warren (incumbent)	11,411	97.59%
Write-in		282	2.41%
Total votes		11,693	100%
Democratic hold			

=== District 83 ===
2018 Alabama's 83rd House of Representatives district election
Party	Candidate	Votes	%
Democratic	Jeremy Gray	8,943	63.39%
Republican	Michael J Holden II	5,143	36.45%
Write-in		22	0.16%
Total votes		14,108	100%
Democratic hold			

=== District 84 ===
2018 Alabama's 84th House of Representatives district election
Party	Candidate	Votes	%
Democratic	Berry Forte (incumbent)	9,962	97.97%
Write-in		206	2.03%
Total votes		10,168	100%
Democratic hold			

=== District 85 ===
2018 Alabama's 85th House of Representatives district election
Party	Candidate	Votes	%
Democratic	Dexter Grimsley (incumbent)	7,315	53.78%
Republican	J. Ron Wilson	6,266	46.07%
Write-in		21	0.15%
Total votes		13,602	100%
Democratic hold			

=== District 86 ===
2018 Alabama's 86th House of Representatives district election
Party	Candidate	Votes	%
Republican	Paul Lee (incumbent)	11,226	77.50%
Democratic	Kristy M. Kirkland	3,238	22.35%
Write-in		21	0.14%
Total votes		14,485	100%
Republican hold			

=== District 87 ===
2018 Alabama's 87th House of Representatives district election
Party	Candidate	Votes	%
Republican	Jeff Sorrells	13,835	98.83%
Write-in		164	1.17%
Total votes		13,999	100%
Republican hold			

=== District 88 ===
2018 Alabama's 88th House of Representatives district election
Party	Candidate	Votes	%
Republican	Will Dismukes	11,500	70.45%
Democratic	Cory Creel	4,793	29.36%
Write-in		31	0.19%
Total votes		16,324	100%
Republican hold			

=== District 89 ===
2018 Alabama's 89th House of Representatives district election
Party	Candidate	Votes	%
Republican	Wes Allen	7,804	59.28%
Democratic	Joel Lee Williams	5,348	40.63%
Write-in		12	0.09%
Total votes		13,164	100%
Republican hold			

=== District 90 ===
2018 Alabama's 90th House of Representatives district election
Party	Candidate	Votes	%
Republican	Chris Sells (incumbent)	11,063	64.61%
Democratic	Joanne Whetstone	6,051	35.24%
Write-in		9	0.05%
Total votes		17,123	100%
Republican hold			

=== District 91 ===
2018 Alabama's 91st House of Representatives district election
Party	Candidate	Votes	%
Republican	Rhett Marques	11,445	98.41%
Write-in		185	1.59%
Total votes		11,630	100%
Republican hold			

=== District 92 ===
2018 Alabama's 92nd House of Representatives district election
Party	Candidate	Votes	%
Republican	Mike Jones Jr.	11,912	99.23%
Write-in		92	0.77%
Total votes		12,004	100%
Republican hold			

=== District 93 ===
2018 Alabama's 93rd House of Representatives district election
Party	Candidate	Votes	%
Republican	Steve Clouse (incumbent)	11,974	97.91%
Write-in		255	2.09%
Total votes		12,229	100%
Republican hold			

=== District 94 ===
2018 Alabama's 94th House of Representatives district election
Party	Candidate	Votes	%
Republican	Joe Faust (incumbent)	15,302	70.92%
Democratic	Danielle Mashburn-Myrick	6,257	29.00%
Write-in		18	0.08%
Total votes		21,577	100%
Republican hold			

=== District 95 ===
2018 Alabama's 95th House of Representatives district election
Party	Candidate	Votes	%
Republican	Steve McMillan (incumbent)	17,008	98.56%
Write-in		249	1.44%
Total votes		17,257	100%
Republican hold			

=== District 96 ===
2018 Alabama's 96th House of Representatives district election
Party	Candidate	Votes	%
Republican	Matt Simpson	13,699	69.08%
Democratic	Maurice Horsey	5,019	25.31%
Libertarian	J. Matthew "Matt" Shelby	1,106	5.58%
Write-in		7	0.04%
Total votes		19,831	100%
Republican hold			

=== District 97 ===
2018 Alabama's 97th House of Representatives district election
Party	Candidate	Votes	%
Democratic	Adline Clarke (incumbent)	8,740	65.43%
Republican	Stephen McNair	4,605	34.47%
Write-in		13	0.10%
Total votes		13,358	100%
Democratic hold			

=== District 98 ===
2018 Alabama's 98th House of Representatives district election
Party	Candidate	Votes	%
Democratic	Napoleon Bracy Jr. (incumbent)	9,674	97.62%
Write-in		236	2.38%
Total votes		9,910	100%
Democratic hold			

=== District 99 ===
2018 Alabama's 99th House of Representatives district election
Party	Candidate	Votes	%
Democratic	Sam Jones	11,794	73.31%
Republican	Charles Talbert	4,270	26.54%
Write-in		24	1.50%
Total votes		16,088	100%
Democratic hold			

=== District 100 ===
2018 Alabama's 100th House of Representatives district election
Party	Candidate	Votes	%
Republican	Victor Gaston (incumbent)	12,086	97.09%
Write-in		362	2.91%
Total votes		12,448	100%
Republican hold			

=== District 101 ===
2018 Alabama's 101st House of Representatives district election
Party	Candidate	Votes	%
Republican	Chris Pringle (incumbent)	10,274	96.82%
Write-in		337	3.18%
Total votes		10,611	100%
Republican hold			

=== District 102 ===
2018 Alabama's 102nd House of Representatives district election
Party	Candidate	Votes	%
Republican	Shane Stringer	11,048	98.21%
Write-in		201	1.79%
Total votes		11,249	100%
Republican hold			

=== District 103 ===
2018 Alabama's 103rd House of Representatives district election
Party	Candidate	Votes	%
Democratic	Barbara Drummond (incumbent)	8,818	98.43%
Write-in		141	1.57%
Total votes		8,959	100%
Democratic hold			

=== District 104 ===
2018 Alabama's 104th House of Representatives district election
Party	Candidate	Votes	%
Republican	Margie Wilcox (incumbent)	10,152	68.35%
Democratic	Arlene Cunningham Easley	4,695	31.61%
Write-in		7	0.05%
Total votes		14,854	100%
Republican hold			

=== District 105 ===
2018 Alabama's 105th House of Representatives district election
Party	Candidate	Votes	%
Republican	Chip Brown	10,176	98.30%
Write-in		176	1.70%
Total votes		10,352	100%
Republican hold			

== See also ==
- 2010 Alabama State House of Representatives election
- 2018 United States elections
- 2018 United States House of Representatives elections in Alabama
- 2018 Alabama gubernatorial election
- Alabama lieutenant gubernatorial election, 2018
- Alabama Attorney General election, 2018
- Alabama State Treasurer election, 2018
- Alabama State Auditor election, 2018
- Alabama Commissioner of Agriculture and Industries election, 2018
- Alabama Public Service Commission election, 2018
- Alabama Secretary of State election, 2018
- 2018 Alabama State Senate election
- 2018 Alabama elections
- Supreme Court of Alabama elections
- List of Alabama state legislatures
