= 2025 Alabama elections =

Elections in the U.S. state of Alabama

Elections were held in the U.S. State of Alabama throughout 2025 to elect municipal positions, as well as special elections to fill state legislative vacancies.

== State legislative ==
=== Senate District 5 ===
2025 Alabama Senate District 5 special election
- June 24, 2025
- Turnout: 8.81% (unofficial)
Candidate	Matt Woods	Ryan Cagle
Party	Republican	Democratic
Popular vote	7,707	1,238
Percentage	86.0%	13.8%
- County results Woods: 80–90% 90–100%
State senator before election
Greg Reed
Republican
Elected state senator
Matt Woods
Republican

The 2025 Alabama Senate District 5 special election was held on June 24, 2025, following the scheduled resignation of incumbent Greg Reed to serve as a workforce advisor for Governor Kay Ivey's administration, to elect the state senator from the 5th Senate district. The primary election was held on March 11. State representative Matt Woods won the election with 86% of the vote.

==== Background ====
Incumbent representative Greg Reed resigned on December 31, 2024, to serve as a workforce advisor to the governor. He was selected by Kay Ivey on November 19, 2024. Ivey announced the date of the election on December 31, when Reed's term as advisor began. Candidates had until January 7 to file as a major-party candidate, and March 11 is the deadline to file as an independent or minor-party candidate.

In the 2024 presidential election, this district voted for Republican candidate Donald Trump by a margin of 73.6 points. In the 2022 legislative election, this district voted for incumbent Republican Greg Reed by a margin of 98.4 points, running in the general election unopposed.

==== Republican primary ====
===== Candidates =====
====== Nominee ======
- Matt Woods, state representative from the 13th district (2022–present)

===== Endorsements =====
Matt Woods

Organizations

- ForestPAC
- ProgressPAC

===== Fundraising =====
Campaign finance reports as of April 25, 2025
Candidate	Raised	Spent	Cash on hand
Matt Woods (R)	$348,922	$96,960	$334,895
Source: Alabama Secretary of State

==== Democratic primary ====
===== Candidates =====
====== Nominee ======
- Ryan Cagle, minister and farmer

====== Eliminated in primary ======
- Sarah Watkins, caregiver and fast food worker

===== Forums =====
2025 Alabama Senate District 5 special election forums
No.	Date	Host	Democratic	Democratic
Key: P Participant A Absent N Not invited I Invited W Withdrawn				
Key: P Participant A Absent N Not invited I Invited W Withdrawn			Cagle	Watkins
1	February 22	—	P	P

===== Fundraising =====
Campaign finance reports as of April 25, 2025
Candidate	Raised	Spent	Cash on hand
Ryan Cagle (D)	$4,261	$136	$4,124
Sarah Watkins (D)	$160	$2	$157
Source: Alabama Secretary of State

===== Results =====
Results by county: Cagle: 60–70%; 80–90%; Watkins: 60–70%

The Democratic primary saw only 360 ballots cast out of 101,577 registered voters, resulting in a turnout of only 0.35%. As no Democratic candidate filed to run in the last election for this district in 2022, there was no primary.

Democratic primary (unofficial results)
Party	Candidate	Votes	%
Democratic	Ryan Cagle	222	61.84
Democratic	Sarah Watkins	137	38.16
Total votes		359	100.00

==== General election ====
===== Results =====
2025 Alabama Senate District 5 special election unofficial results
Party	Candidate	Votes	%	±%
Republican	Matt Woods	7,707	86.00%	−13.19%
Democratic	Ryan Cagle	1,238	13.81%	New
Write-in		17	0.19%	−0.62%
Total votes		8,962	100.00	
Turnout		8,963	8.81%	
Registered electors		101,745		

Results by County
County	Woods		Cagle		Total
Fayette	1,014	90.29%	109	9.71%	1,123
Jefferson	325	92.59%	26	7.41%	351
Lamar	885	94.35%	53	5.65%	938
Tuscaloosa	931	87.91%	128	12.09%	1,059
Walker	4,552	83.16%	922	16.84%	5,474

=== House District 11 ===
2025 Alabama House of Representatives District 11 special election
- August 26, 2025
Candidate	Heath Allbright	Alexandria Braswell
Party	Republican	Democratic
Popular vote	2,783	351
Percentage	88.4%	11.2%
Alabama state representative before election
Randall Shedd
Republican
Elected Alabama state representative
Heath Allbright
Republican

The 2025 Alabama House of Representatives District 11 special election was held on August 26, 2025, to elect the representative for Alabama's 11th House of Representatives District. The primary election was held on May 13, 2025.

==== Background ====
Incumbent representative Randall Shedd was reelected with 99% of the vote in 2022, and has not faced opposition since he was initially elected in 2013. He resigned from the House of Representatives in mid-February 2025 to serve as the director of constituent affairs for Garlan Gudger. Governor Kay Ivey signed a writ of election following his official resignation on February 24. Major party candidates had until March 11 to qualify, and independent or third-party candidates had until May 13.

==== Republican primary ====
Candidate qualifying opened on March 5, 2025.

===== Candidates =====
====== Nominee ======
- Heath Allbright, former Cullman County Board of Education member

====== Eliminated in primary ======
- Don Fallin, retired U.S. Army Col.

===== Endorsements =====
Heath Allbright

Statewide officials

- Will Ainsworth, Lieutenant Governor of Alabama (2019–present) and state representative from the 27th district (2014–2018)

Organizations

- ProgressPAC

===== Fundraising =====
Campaign finance reports as of May 14, 2025
Candidate	Raised	Spent	Cash on hand
Heath Allbright (R)	$88,200	$62,185	$56,014
Don Fallin (R)	$60,264	$59,707	$11,813
Source: Alabama Secretary of State

===== Campaign =====
A candidate forum was held in April 2025, where both candidates participated. The candidates discussed issues such as anti-Israel movements in the US, transgender athletes, book bans, and chemtrails. The candidates have agreed on most issues, including opposition to lottery in Alabama.

On April 14, Fallin signed the Americans for Tax Reform Taxpayer Protection Pledge to never support any tax increases if elected.

In a candidate forum held on April 30, Fallin accused Allbright of being hand-picked by "Montgomery officials and special interests," alluding to the money that Allbright has received from political action committees. Allbright denied the accusation that he was part of a "conspiracy," or was chosen to take over the seat.

In May, Allbright's approval of a contract for an organization specializing in mental health was publicized. The organization later made posts on social media celebrating Pride Month, which led to Allbright being questioned by conservative media outlet 1819 News on his relationship with the organization.

On May 5, an online poll was messaged to residents of District 11, accusing Fallin of taking money from "deep-blue, radical liberal states," along with various other accusatory claims. Fallin attributed these donations to veterans who were stationed around the country. Allbright issued a video statement in which he stated that he was "running a positive campaign."

===== Results =====
The election was called on the night of the election, Allbright won with 54% of the vote.

Republican primary
Party	Candidate	Votes	%
Republican	Heath Allbright	1,909	54.26
Republican	Don Fallin	1,609	45.74
Total votes		3,518	100.00

==== Democratic primary ====
Candidate qualifying opened on February 27.

===== Candidates =====
====== Nominee ======
- Alexandria Braswell, Sign Language Interpreter

===== Fundraising =====
Campaign finance reports as of May 14, 2025
Candidate	Raised	Spent	Cash on hand
Alexandria Braswell (D)	$6,274	$2,204	$4,869
Source: Alabama Secretary of State

==== General election ====
===== Post-primary endorsements =====
Alexandria Braswell

Federal officials

- Doug Jones, former U.S. Senator from Alabama (2017–2021)

===== Results =====
2025 Alabama's 11th House of Representatives district special election
Party	Candidate	Votes	%	
Republican	Heath Allbright	2,783	88.38%	−10.82%
Democratic	Alexandria Braswell	351	11.15%	New
Write-in		15	0.48%	−0.32%
Total votes		3,134	100.0	
Turnout		3,153	8.80%	
Registered electors		35,827		

Results by County
County	Allbright		Braswell		Write in		Total
Blount	670	88.62%	80	10.58%	6	0.79%	756
Cullman	2,113	88.30%	271	11.32%	9	0.38%	2,393

=== House District 12 ===
2025 Alabama House of Representatives District 12 special election
- October 28, 2025
Candidate	Cindy Myrex	Matthew Glover
Party	Republican	Democratic
Popular vote	1,944	287
Percentage	87.1%	12.9%
Alabama state representative before election
Corey Harbison
Republican
Elected Alabama state representative
Cindy Myrex
Republican

The 2025 Alabama House of Representatives District 12 special election was held on October 28, 2025, following the resignation of representative Corey Harbison. The primary election was held on July 15, 2025, and the runoff election was held on August 12.

==== Background ====
Incumbent representative Corey Harbison planned to resign no later than April 15, to spend time with his family following the birth of two new children since his election in 2022. He temporarily delayed his resignation, citing his concerns with when the election would be scheduled, and officially resigned on April 16. In the 2025 legislative session, Harbison was absent for the majority of the session.

The election was officially called by Governor Kay Ivey on April 29, 2025. Major-party candidates had until May 13 to qualify, while third-party and independent candidates had until July 15.

==== Republican primary ====
Qualifying for the Republican primary officially opened on May 12.

===== Candidates =====
====== Nominee ======
- Cindy Myrex, realtor

====== Eliminated in runoff ======
- Clint Hollingsworth, at-large member of the Cullman city council

====== Eliminated in primary ======
- Heather Doyle, small business owner and realtor
- Dan McWhorter, businessman

===== Endorsements =====
Clint Hollingsworth

Organizations

- Business Council of Alabama
Dan McWhorter

Organizations

- Alabama Cannabis Coalition
Cindy Myrex

Organizations

- FarmPAC
Declined to endorse

State representatives

- Corey Harbison, outgoing state representative from the 12th district

===== Campaign =====
During a public forum, all four candidates expressed interest in supporting legislation that would permit a vote on legalizing the lottery or gambling.

===== Results =====
Republican primary
Party	Candidate	Votes	%
Republican	Cindy Myrex	2,129	49.81
Republican	Clint Hollingsworth	1,848	43.24
Republican	Heather Doyle	150	3.51
Republican	Dan McWhorter	147	3.44
Total votes		4,274	100.00

===== Runoff =====
====== Results ======
Republican primary runoff
Party	Candidate	Votes	%
Republican	Cindy Myrex	3,048	58.53
Republican	Clint Hollingsworth	2,160	41.47
Total votes		5,208	100.00

==== Democratic primary ====
===== Candidates =====
====== Nominee ======
- Matthew Glover, former member of the Good Hope city council

==== General election ====
===== Results =====
2025 Alabama House of Representatives District 12 special election
Party	Candidate	Votes	%	±%
Republican	Cindy Myrex	1,944	87.06%	+1.71%
Democratic	Matthew Glover	287	12.85%	−1.64%
Write-in		2	0.09%	–0.07%
Total votes		2,233	100.00	
Turnout		2,234	3.38%	
Registered electors		66,132		

== Local ==
Municipal elections were held in several cities on August 26, 2025, with the exception of Tuscaloosa, which was held on March 4, 2025. The qualifying deadline for most municipalities was June 24. Runoff elections for some municipalities were held on September 23, if necessary.
