= Alabama's 2nd House of Representatives district =

American legislative district

Alabama's 2nd State House of Representatives district
Representative
Lynn Greer; R–Rogersville

Alabama's 2nd House of Representatives district is one of 105 districts in the Alabama House of Representatives. Its current representative is Ben Harrison. The district was created in 1966 and encompasses parts of Lauderdale and Limestone counties.

== Representatives ==
Representative	Party	Term start	Term end	Electoral history	Represented counties	Ref.
District created			November 9, 1966			
Robert R. Berryman	Democratic	November 9, 1966	July 9, 1969	Died in office	Limestone, Lawrence	
Karl E. Burgreen	Democratic	November 9, 1966	November 4, 1970	Elected in 1966	Limestone, Lawrence	
Kiley T. Berryman	Democratic	July 9, 1969	November 4, 1970	Finished husband's term	Limestone, Lawrence	
Thomas Carter	Democratic	November 4, 1970	November 6, 1974	Elected in 1970	Limestone, Lawrence	
Wayland Cross	Democratic	November 4, 1970	November 6, 1974	Elected in 1970	Limestone, Lawrence	
Robert M. Hill Jr.	Democratic	November 6, 1974	November 8, 1978	Elected in 1974	Lawrence	
Nelson R. Starkey Jr.	Democratic	November 8, 1978	November 3, 1982	Elected in 1978; Elected in 1982	Lawrence	
Nelson R. Starkey Jr.	Democratic	November 3, 1982	November 9, 1983	Elected in 1978; Elected in 1982	Lawrence	
Tom C. Coburn	Democratic	November 9, 1983	November 5, 1986	Elected in 1983; Elected in 1986	Colbert	
Tom C. Coburn	Democratic	November 5, 1986	November 7, 1990	Elected in 1983; Elected in 1986	Colbert	
Marcel Black	Democratic	November 7, 1990	November 9, 1994	Elected in 1990	Colbert	
James H. Hamilton	Democratic	November 9, 1994	November 4, 1998	Elected in 1994; Elected in 1998	Lauderdale, Limestone	
James H. Hamilton	Democratic	November 4, 1998	November 6, 2002	Elected in 1994; Elected in 1998	Lauderdale, Limestone	
Lynn Greer	Republican	November 6, 2002	November 8, 2006	Elected in 2002	Lauderdale, Limestone	
Mike Curtis	Democratic	November 8, 2006	November 3, 2010	Elected in 2006	Lauderdale, Limestone	
Lynn Greer	Republican	November 3, 2010	November 5, 2014	Elected in 2010; Elected in 2014; Elected in 2018	Lauderdale, Limestone	
Lynn Greer	Republican	November 5, 2014	November 7, 2018	Elected in 2010; Elected in 2014; Elected in 2018	Lauderdale, Limestone	
Lynn Greer	Republican	November 7, 2018	November 9, 2022	Elected in 2010; Elected in 2014; Elected in 2018	Lauderdale, Limestone	

== General elections ==
Year	Democratic			Republican			Other		
Year	Candidate	Votes	%	Candidate	Votes	%	Candidate	Votes	%
1966	√Robert R. Berryman	10,629	42.31	Norman Pool	1,982	7.89	None		
1966	√Edward Burgreen	10,454	41.61	Curtis B. Campbell	2,057	8.19	None		
1970	√Tommy Carter	11,423	100.00	None			None		
1970	√Wayland Cross	11,433	100.00	None			None		
1974	√Robert M. Hill Jr.	2,883	100.00	None			None		
1978	√Nelson R. Starkey Jr.	[data missing]		[data missing]			[data missing]		
1982	√Nelson R. Starkey Jr.	8,191	90.88	None			Bill Spears (Independent)	822	9.12
1983	√Tom C. Coburn	1,355	100.00	None			None		
1986	√Tom C. Coburn	7,279	100.00	None			None		
1990	√Marcel Black	6,496	100.00	None			None		
1994	√James H. Hamilton	8,019	98.48	None			Others	124	1.52
1998	√James H. Hamilton	8,178	66.23	Tex Tatum	4,161	33.70	Others	9	0.07
2002	Mary Pettus	5,718	46.40	√Lynn Greer	6,426	52.14	Johnny Letson (Libertarian)	180	1.46
2006	√Mike Curtis	7,702	65.19	Mary Pettus	4,113	34.81	None		
2010	Mike Curtis	6,284	45.22	√Lynn Greer	7,599	54.68	Write-Ins	15	0.11
2014	Andrew Betterton	5,224	37.87	√Lynn Greer	8,561	62.05	Write-Ins	11	0.08
2018	Lora Mae Morrow	4,798	26.84	√Lynn Greer	13,056	73.04	Write-Ins	21	0.12
2022	None			√Ben Harrison	11,233	80.28	Write-Ins	2,760	19.72
