= Ronnie Flippo =

American politician (born 1937)

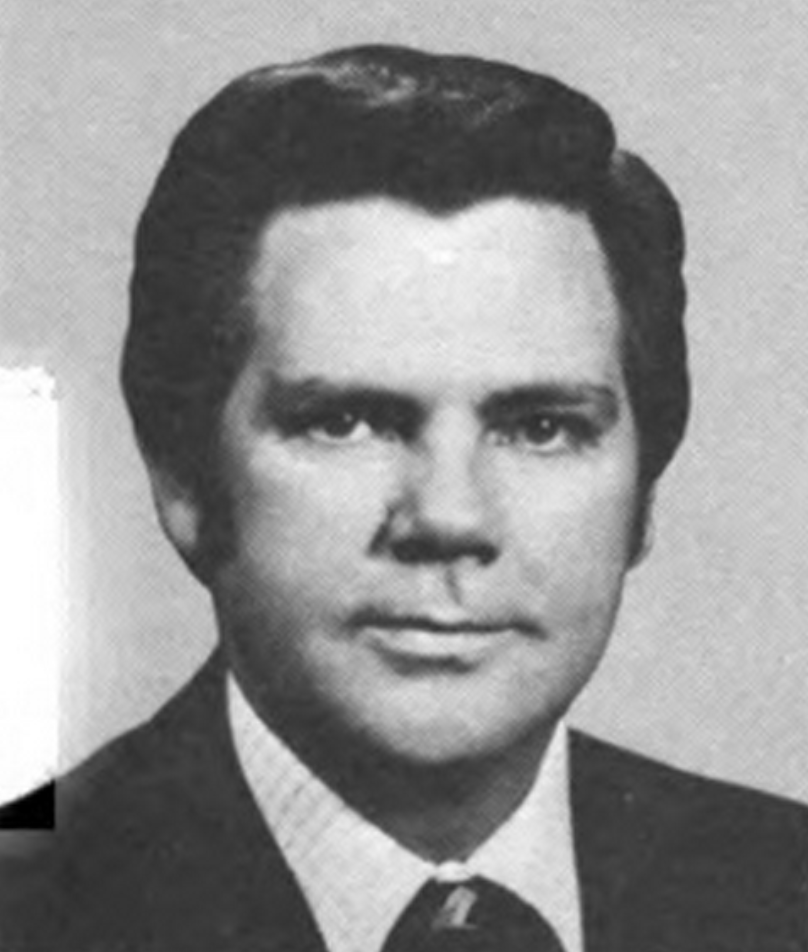

Member of the U.S. House of Representatives from Alabama's 5th district
- In office January 3, 1977 – January 3, 1991
- Preceded by: Robert E. Jones Jr.
- Succeeded by: Bud Cramer

Member of the Alabama Senate from the 1st district
- In office November 6, 1974 – November 1976
- Preceded by: Stewart O'Bannon Jr.
- Succeeded by: Oscar Ray Peden

Member of the Alabama House of Representatives from the 1st district
- In office November 4, 1970 – November 6, 1974 Serving with Robert M. Hill Jr.
- Preceded by: James H. Haygood
- Succeeded by: Lynn Greer

Personal details
- Born: Ronnie Gene Flippo; August 15, 1937 (age 89) Florence, Alabama, U.S.
- Party: Democratic
- Education: University of North Alabama (BS); University of Alabama (MS)

Ronnie Gene Flippo /ˈflɪpoʊ/ (born August 15, 1937) is an American politician and accountant who served seven terms as a United States Congressman from Alabama from 1977 to 1991.

== Early life and education ==
Flippo was born August 15, 1937, in Florence, Alabama, to Claude Nathaniel Flippo and Esther McAfee. Claude Flippo was killed in a construction accident in 1943.

In 1955 Ronnie graduated from Coffee High School in Florence. After high school, he began work as an iron worker. In 1958, he married Faye Cooper, with whom he would have six children.

Like his father, Ronnie suffered a significant construction accident, falling 55 feet while working at a Tennessee Valley Authority steam plant in 1961. He survived, but was hospitalized for more than a year with major injuries.

He then attended the University of North Alabama and earned a Bachelor of Science degree in Accounting. This was followed up by a master's degree in accounting from the University of Alabama.

== Early career ==
Flippo worked as a CPA after graduating from college, eventually starting his own accounting firm in 1971. He also taught accounting at UNA prior to running for the state legislature.

== Political career ==
=== State legislature ===
In 1970, he successfully ran as a Democrat for a seat in the Alabama House of Representatives from the 1st distrist, serving from November 4, 1970 to November 6, 1974 and succeeded by Lynn Greer. After one term, he gave up his State House seat for a successful run for the Alabama Senate, serving from November 6, 1974 to November 1976.

=== Congress ===
In 1976, incumbent congressman Robert E. Jones, Jr. retired. Flippo won the election on November 2, 1976. He developed a reputation as a conservative Democrat, supporting business interests and fiscally conservative budgets. In 1980, he addressed the Democratic National Convention, speaking about the role of the Democratic Party in the American South.

During his tenure, he was a leader on tax reform issues, as well as the debate on the modernization of the Tennessee Valley Authority. He also led a successful three-year legislative battle to protect 28,000 acres in the Sipsey Wilderness Area within the Bankhead National Forest.

Flippo voted for the Abandoned Shipwrecks Act of 1987. The Act asserts United States title to certain abandoned shipwrecks located on or embedded in submerged lands under state jurisdiction, and transfers title to the respective state, thereby empowering states to manage these cultural and historical resources more efficiently, with the goal of preventing treasure hunters and salvagers from damaging them. President Ronald Reagan signed it into law on April 28, 1988.

Flippo served in the House until 1991. He did not seek re-election in 1990, but ran for Governor of Alabama. He was defeated in the Democratic primary, finishing fourth in a field led by eventual nominee Paul Hubbert, who lost the general election to Republican incumbent H. Guy Hunt.

== Later career ==
After leaving politics, Flippo founded a private management consulting firm, R.G. Flippo & Associates. He served on several boards and governing bodies, including the Potomac Institute for Policy Studies, the Alabama Commission on Infrastructure, and the University of North Alabama Foundation.

He currently resides in Florence, Alabama.

U.S. House of Representatives
| Preceded by Robert E. Jones Jr. | Member of the U.S. House of Representatives from Alabama's 5th congressional district 1977–1991 | Succeeded by Bud Cramer |
U.S. order of precedence (ceremonial)
| Preceded by Judy Biggert as Former U.S. Representative | Order of precedence of the United States as Former U.S. Representative | Succeeded by Vic Snyder as Former U.S. Representative |
