= Maurice McCaney =

American politician

Member-elect of the Alabama House of Representatives from the 1st district
- Assuming office November 3, 2026
- Succeeding: Phillip Pettus

Personal details
- Party: Republican

Maurice McCaney is an American politician. A member of the Republican Party, he is the member-elect for the 1st district of the Alabama House of Representatives.
