= James Harold Hamilton =

American politician

Member of the Alabama House of Representatives from the 4th district
- In office November 5, 1986 – November 9, 1994
- Preceded by: [data missing]
- Succeeded by: [data missing]

Member of the Alabama House of Representatives from the 2nd district
- In office November 9, 1994 – November 6, 2002
- Preceded by: Marcel Black
- Succeeded by: Lynn Greer

Personal details
- Born: December 8, 1932 Rogersville, Lauderdale County, Alabama, US
- Died: March 1, 2009 (aged 76) Florence, Lauderdale County, Alabama, US
- Party: Democratic
- Spouse: Margaret Anne Walton (m. 1956–2009)
- Children: 2
- Parent(s): James Edward Hamilton; Myrdie Mae Hammond

James Harold Hamilton (December 8, 1932 – March 1, 2009) was an American politician who served in the Alabama House of Representatives from 1986 to 2002.

== Life ==
Hamilton was born on December 8, 1932, in Rogersville, Lauderdale County, Alabama, US to James Edward Hamilton and Myrdie Mae Hammond. He was one of 4 children. One of them dying at a very young age. He would later marry Margaret Anne Walton on May 17, 1956. They had 2 children.

Hamilton died on March 1, 2009, at the age of 76.
