= 1998 Alabama Commissioner of Agriculture and Industries election =

- November 3, 1998
Candidate	Charles Bishop	Jack Thompson
Party	Democratic	Republican
Popular vote	624,426	589,041
Percentage	51.5%	48.5%
- County results Bishop: 50–60% 60–70% 70–80% 80–90% Thompson: 50–60% 60–70% 70–80%
Commissioner before election
Jack Thompson
Republican
Elected Commissioner
Charles Bishop
Democratic

The 1998 Alabama Commissioner of Agriculture and Industries election was held on November 3, 1998 to elect the Alabama Commissioner of Agriculture and Industries. Jack Thompson lost re-election to a second consecutive term.

== Republican primary ==
=== Candidates ===
==== Nominee ====
- Jack Thompson, incumbent commissioner

== Democratic primary ==
=== Candidates ===
==== Nominee ====
- Charles Bishop, former state senator

==== Eliminated in primary ====
- Anne Payne, farmer

=== Results ===
Democratic primary
Party	Candidate	Votes	%
Democratic	Charles Bishop	181,116	54.38
Democratic	Anne Payne	151,910	45.62
Total votes		333,026	100.00

== General election ==
=== Results ===
1998 Alabama Commissioner of Agriculture and Industries election
Party	Candidate	Votes	%
Democratic	Charles Bishop	624,426	51.46
Republican	Jack Thompson (incumbent)	589,041	48.54
Total votes		1,213,467	100.00
