= Robert R. Berryman =

American politician

Robert Rufus Berryman

Member of the Alabama House of Representatives from the 2nd district
- In office January 3, 1967 – July 9, 1969
- Preceded by: District Created
- Succeeded by: Kiley T. Berryman

Personal details
- Born: February 25, 1902 Lawrence County, Alabama, US
- Died: July 9, 1969 (aged 67)
- Party: Democratic
- Spouse: Kylie Terry
- Children: 1
- Parent(s): William Andrew Berryman; Octavia M. Masterson

Robert Rufus Berryman (February 1902 – July 9, 1969) was an American politician who served in the Alabama House of Representatives from January 1967 until his death in July 1969.

== Life ==
Berryman was born in February 1902 to William Andrew Berryman and Octavia M. Masterson in Lawrence County, Alabama. He was one of 9 children. On April 6, 1928, he married Kylie Terry. They had one child together. He died on July 9, 1969, at the age of 67.
