= Alabama's 5th Senate district =

American legislative district

Alabama's 5th State Senate district
Senator
Matt Woods; R–Jasper
- Demographics: 88.6% White; 6.4% Black; 2% Hispanic; 0.2% Asian
- Population (2022): 135,221

Alabama's 5th Senate district is one of 35 districts in the Alabama Senate. The district has been represented by Matt Woods since a special election in 2025.

The district covers the entirety of Fayette, Lamar, and Walker counties, as well as portions of Jefferson and Tuscaloosa counties.

== Geography ==
Election	Map	Counties in District
2022; 2026		Fayette, Lamar, Walker, portions of Jefferson, Tuscaloosa
2018		Fayette, Walker, portions of Jefferson, Tuscaloosa, Winston
2014		Fayette, Walker, portions of Jefferson, Tuscaloosa, Winston
2010; 2006; 2002		Walker, portions of Jefferson, Tuscaloosa, Winston

== Election history ==
=== Elections in the 2020s ===
Alabama Senate District 5 special election (June 24, 2025)
Party	Candidate	Votes	%	±%
Republican	Matt Woods	7,707	86.00	−13.19
Democratic	Ryan Cagle	1,238	13.81	+13.81
Write-in		17	0.19	-0.62
Majority		6,469	72.18	−26.20
Turnout		8,962		
Republican hold				

Alabama Senate election, 2022: Senate District 5
Party	Candidate	Votes	%	±%
Republican	Greg Reed (Incumbent)	36,159	99.19	+0.35
Write-in		296	0.81	-0.35
Majority		35,863	98.38	+0.70
Turnout		36,455		
Republican hold				

=== Elections in the 2010s ===
Alabama Senate election, 2018: Senate District 5
Party	Candidate	Votes	%	±%
Republican	Greg Reed (Incumbent)	42,404	98.84	+0.17
Write-in		497	1.16	-0.17
Majority		41,907	97.68	+0.34
Turnout		42,901		
Republican hold				

Alabama Senate election, 2010: Senate District 5
Party	Candidate	Votes	%	±%
Republican	Greg Reed (Incumbent)	29,611	98.67	+25.44
Write-in		399	1.33	+1.26
Majority		29,212	97.34	+50.81
Turnout		30,010		
Republican hold				

Alabama Senate election, 2010: Senate District 5
Party	Candidate	Votes	%	±%
Republican	Greg Reed	33,500	73.23	+18.00
Democratic	Brett Wadsworth	12,213	26.70	−17.03
Write-in		33	0.07	-0.97
Majority		21,287	46.53	
Turnout		45,746		
Republican hold				

=== Elections in the 2000s ===
Alabama Senate election, 2006: Senate District 5
Party	Candidate	Votes	%	±%
Republican	Charles Bishop	20,322	55.23	−2.72
Democratic	Larry Cagle	16,088	43.73	+1.76
Write-in		383	1.04	+0.96
Majority		4,234	11.51	−4.47
Turnout		36,793		
Republican hold				

Alabama Senate election, 2002: Senate District 5
Party	Candidate	Votes	%	±%
Republican	Curt Lee (Incumbent)	23,657	57.95	+3.32
Democratic	John Randall Dutton	17,133	41.97	−3.33
Write-in		31	0.08	+0.01
Majority		6,524	15.98	
Turnout		40,821		
Republican hold				

=== Elections in the 1990s ===
Alabama Senate election, 1998: Senate District 5
Party	Candidate	Votes	%	±%
Republican	Curt Lee	23,000	54.63	+3.31
Democratic	Jerry O. Bishop	19,072	45.30	−3.32
Write-in		30	0.07	+0.01
Majority		3,928	9.33	+6.63
Turnout		42,102		
Republican hold				

Alabama Senate election, 1994: Senate District 5
Party	Candidate	Votes	%	±%
Republican	Charles Davidson	19,098	51.32	+18.48
Democratic	Robert T. Wilson Jr. (Incumbent)	18,093	48.62	−18.53
Write-in		22	0.06	+0.05
Majority		3,928	2.70	−31.6
Turnout		37,213		
Republican gain from Democratic				

Alabama Senate election, 1990: Senate District 5
Party	Candidate	Votes	%	±%
Democratic	Robert T. Wilson Jr.	23,413	67.15	−1.22
Republican	Eddie Key	11,452	32.84	+1.21
Write-in		2	0.01	+0.01
Majority		11,961	34.30	−2.43
Turnout		34,867		
Democratic hold				

=== Elections in the 1980s ===
Alabama Senate election, 1986: Senate District 5
Party	Candidate	Votes	%	±%
Democratic	Charles Bishop (Incumbent)	21,011	68.37	−7.67
Republican	Charles Stalfort	9,722	31.63	+7.74
Majority		11,289	36.73	−15.41
Turnout		30,733		
Democratic hold				

Alabama Senate election, 1983: Senate District 5
Party	Candidate	Votes	%	±%
Democratic	Charles Bishop (Incumbent)	6,314	76.04	−23.96
Republican	Loyd E. Lawson	1,984	23.89	+23.89
Write-in		6	0.07	+0.07
Majority		4,330	52.14	−47.86
Turnout		8,304		
Democratic hold				

Alabama Senate election, 1982: Senate District 5
Party	Candidate	Votes	%	±%
Democratic	Charles Bishop	16,494	100.00	
Majority		16,494	100.00	
Turnout		16,494		
Democratic hold				

== District officeholders ==
Senators take office at midnight on the day of their election.

- Matt Woods (2025–present)
- Greg Reed (2010–2025)
- Charles Bishop (2006–2010)
- Curt Lee (1998–2006)
- Charles Davidson (1994–1998)
- Robert T. Wilson Jr. (1990–1994)
- Charles Bishop (1982–1990)
- Bob Hall (1978–1982)
- Robert T. Wilson (1974–1978)
- Joe Fine (1970–1974)
- W. Emmett Oden (1966–1970)
- Clayton Carter (1962–1966)
- D. Donald Word (1958–1962)
- Smith C. Dyar (1954–1958)
