= Robert E. Jones Jr. =

American politician (1912–1997)

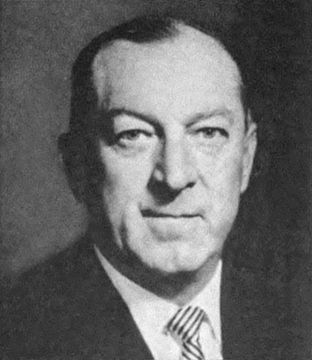
- Jones in 1965

Member of the U.S. House of Representatives from Alabama
- In office January 28, 1947 – January 3, 1977
- Preceded by: John J. Sparkman
- Succeeded by: Ronnie Flippo
- Constituency: 8th District (1947–1963); At-large (1963–1965); 8th District (1965–1973); 5th District (1973–1977)

Personal details
- Born: Robert Emmett Jones Jr. June 12, 1912 Scottsboro, Alabama
- Died: June 4, 1997 (aged 84) Florence, Alabama
- Party: Democratic

Robert "Bob" Emmett Jones Jr. (June 12, 1912 – June 4, 1997) was a member of the United States House of Representatives from the 8th district of Alabama. He was the last to represent that district before it was renumbered as a result of the 1970 United States census. Presently there are seven U.S. House districts in Alabama.

In 1962 and 1964, Alabama, having failed to redistrict after the 1960 Census removed one of its districts, held run-off primaries for its representatives at large, and in 1962 elected them at large as well. First primaries were held in the nine old districts with the winners of those contests competing against each other in the run-off. In 1964 with the Republican presidential nominee Barry Goldwater seeking Southern white votes, the state quickly redistricted and the general election was held by district. Jones was not expected to succeed in either of the at large primaries but came in seventh out of eight each time.

== Early life ==
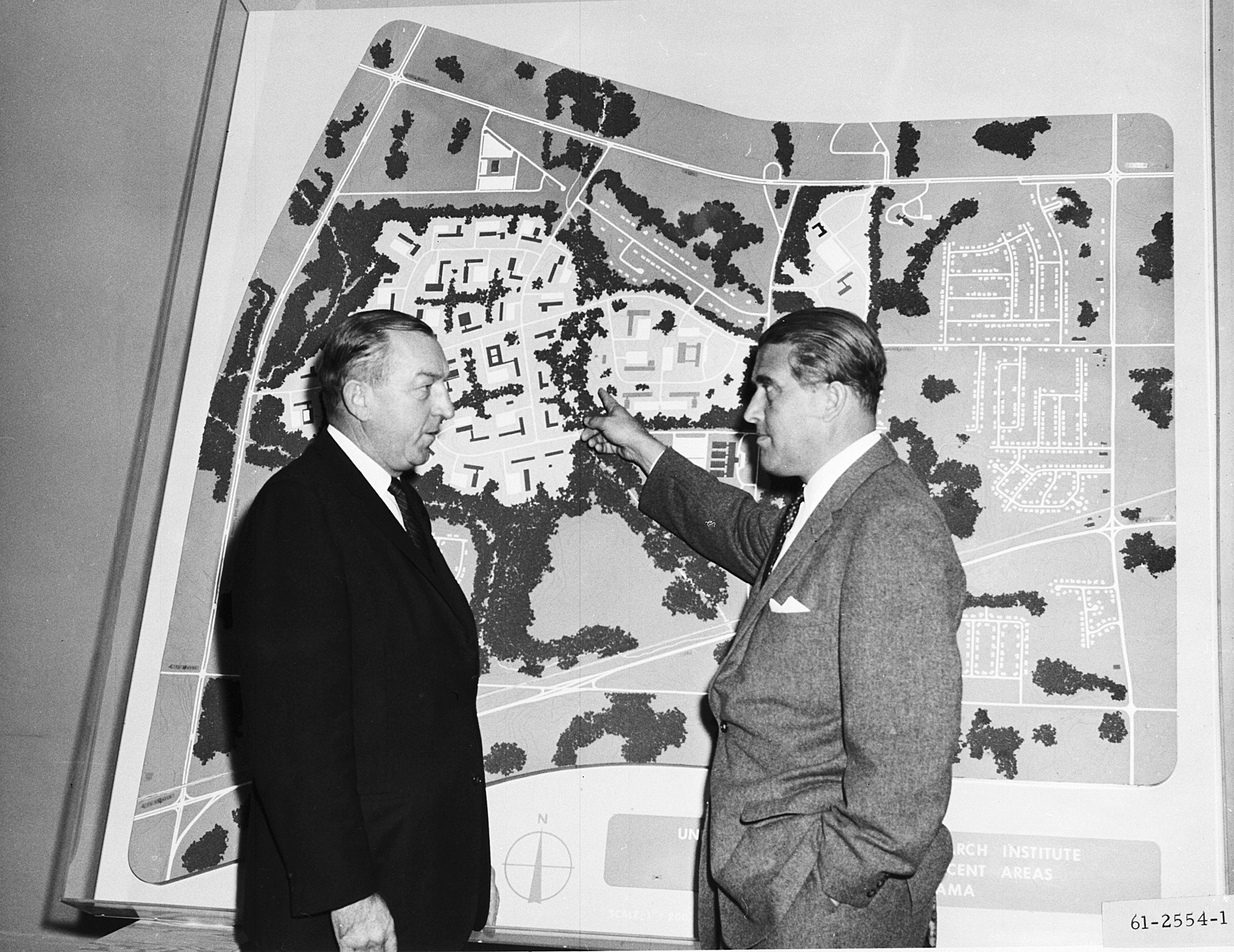
Congressman Robert Jones and Wernher von Braun review a huge map illustrating the layout for a Research Institute at the University of Alabama in Huntsville. (1961)

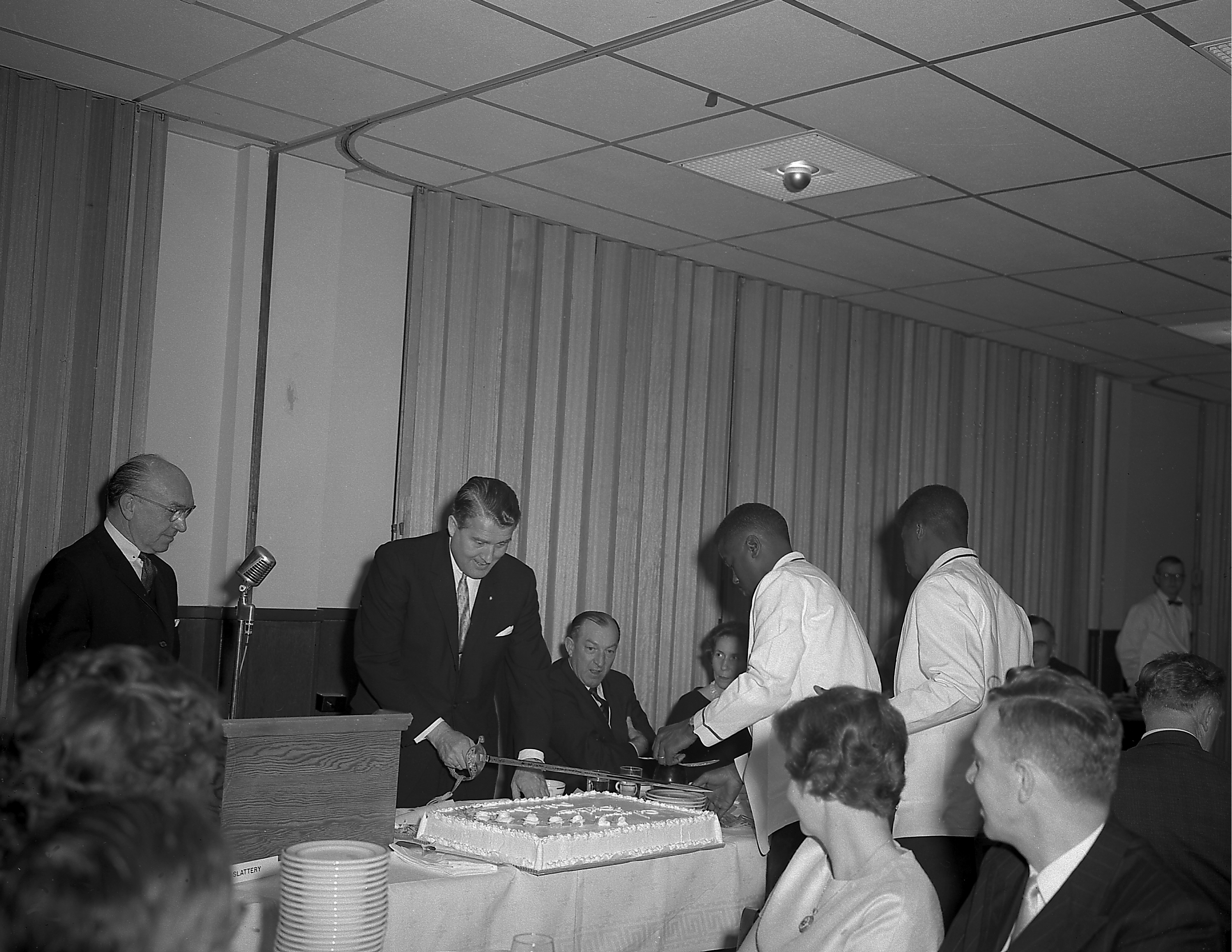
Wernher von Braun's 50th Birthday Party was celebrated at the Officers Club at Redstone Arsenal on March 23, 1962. Dr. von Braun cuts his birthday cake while Congressman Bob Jones looks on.

Robert Emmett Jones Jr. was born on June 12, 1912, in Scottsboro, Alabama, in Jackson County. He attended public schools and the University of Alabama. He graduated from the University of Alabama law department on January 7, 1937, and was admitted to the bar the same year. His early years saw much legal work in Scottsboro. Jones was elected judge of Jackson County Court in July 1940 then reelected in absentia in May 1945 where he served until October 1946. Jones served in the United States Navy as a gunnery officer in both the Atlantic and Pacific theaters from December 1943 until February 1946.

== Congressional career ==
A New Deal Democrat, Jones first entered the United States Congress by special election in 1947 when he was elected to the seat vacated by John Sparkman who had been elected to the U.S. Senate. In 1949, he actively supported the Housing Act of 1949, and played a key role in Section V of the bill which provided money for rural farm housing. He also supported the renewal of the act in 1961. He advocated legislation that led to the Federal Highway Act of 1956, which helped create the modern interstate system. Having been a signatory to the 1956 Southern Manifesto that opposed the desegregation of public schools ordered by the Supreme Court in Brown v. Board of Education. Jones voted against the Civil Rights Acts of 1957, the Civil Rights Acts of 1960, the Civil Rights Acts of 1964, and the Civil Rights Acts of 1968 as well as the 24th Amendment to the U.S. Constitution and the Voting Rights Act of 1965.

Jones was an advocate for the economic development of north Alabama, and supported military, NASA, and Tennessee Valley Authority projects in his district. Jones served as Chairman of the House Public Works and Transportation Committee in his last term. Jones served 14 consecutive terms until his retirement on January 3, 1977. Jones was not a candidate for reelection in 1976. His papers are housed at the University of Alabama in Huntsville.

=== Achievements ===
Among his legislative achievements was his principal sponsorship of the Federal Water Pollution Control Act of 1972. He was also instrumental in passage of the 1965 Appalachian Regional Development Act.

== Honors and memorials ==
Bob Jones High School in Madison, Alabama, is named in his honor, as is the Bob Jones Bridge over the Tennessee River in his native Scottsboro.

== After Congress ==
Jones died June 4, 1997, in Florence, Alabama.

U.S. House of Representatives
Preceded by John Sparkman	Member of the U.S. House of Representatives from Alabama's 8th congressional district 1947–1963	Succeeded by District eliminated
Preceded by District inactive	Member of the U.S. House of Representatives from Alabama's at-large congressional district 1963–1965 all representatives elected at-large on a general ticket	Succeeded by District inactive
Preceded by District inactive	Member of the U.S. House of Representatives from Alabama's 8th congressional district 1965–1973	Succeeded by District inactive
Preceded by Walter Flowers	Member of the U.S. House of Representatives from Alabama's 5th congressional district 1973–1977	Succeeded by Ronnie Flippo
Political offices
Preceded by John Blatnik; Minnesota	Chairman of House Transportation Committee; 1975–1977	Succeeded by James J. Howard; New Jersey
