= Greg Burdine =

American politician (1959–2020)

Member of the Alabama House of Representatives from the 1st district
- In office November 3, 2010 – November 4, 2014
- Preceded by: Tammy Irons
- Succeeded by: Phillip Pettus

Personal details
- Born: May 1, 1959 Florence, Alabama, U.S.
- Died: December 13, 2020 (aged 61) Florence, Alabama
- Party: Democratic
- Spouse: Susan Burdine
- Children: Chad; Robbie
- Education: Cumberland School of Law; University of North Alabama
- Profession: Attorney; Chief Financial Officer
- Website: Representative Greg Burdine

Gregory Keith Burdine (May 1, 1959 – December 13, 2020) was an American politician who served as a Democratic member of the Alabama House of Representatives, representing the 1st District from 2010 to 2014. He was elected on November 2, 2010, and served one term.

Burdine earned his BS in Finance from the University of North Alabama in 1982. He went on to receive his JD from Cumberland School of Law in 1988. Burdine was a Finance Officer from 1982 to 1985. He was a partner in the law firm of Suttle, Mitchell, & Burdine since 1989.

He died on December 13, 2020, in Florence, Alabama, at age 61.

== Committee assignments ==
Burdine served on the following Alabama House of Representatives committees:

- Insurance Committee
- Judiciary Committee
- Local Legislation Committee

== Elections ==
=== 2010 ===
Burdine defeated Hermon T. Graham and Candy Haddock in the June 1 primary. He then defeated Quinton Hanson in the November 2 general election.

Alabama House of Representatives, District 1 General Election (2010)
Party	Candidate	Votes	%	±%
Democratic	Greg Burdine	7,083	50.69	−14.41%
Republican	Quinton Hanson	6,877	49.21	+14.31%
Write-ins		14	0.10%	+0.10%
Total votes		13,974	100	
Democratic hold				
Margin of victory		206	1.47%	

Alabama House of Representatives, District 1 Democratic Primary (2010)
Party	Candidate	Votes	%
Democratic	Greg Burdine	2,725	56.35
Democratic	Candy Haddock	1,360	28.15
Democratic	Hermon T. Graham	749	15.50
Total votes		4,834	100
Margin of victory		1,363	28.21%

Alabama House of Representatives
Preceded by Tammy Irons	Member of the Alabama House of Representatives, 1st district 2010–2014	Succeeded by Phillip Pettus
