= Robert M. Hill Jr. =

American politician

Member of the Alabama House of Representatives from the 1st district
- In office November 9, 1966 – November 6, 1974
- Preceded by: District Created
- Succeeded by: Lynn Greer

Member of the Alabama House of Representatives from the 2nd district
- In office November 6, 1974 – November 8, 1978
- Preceded by: Thomas Carter; Wayland Cross
- Succeeded by: Nelson R. Starkey Jr.

Personal details
- Born: April 16, 1932 (age 94) Alabama, USA
- Party: Democratic

Robert M. Hill Jr. (born April 16, 1932) is an American politician who served in the Alabama House of Representatives from 1966 to 1978.

== Politics ==
He served in the Alabama House of Representatives from November 1966 to November 1978.
