= Karl E. Burgreen =

American politician

Karl Edward Burgreen

Member of the Alabama House of Representatives from the 2nd district
- In office November 9, 1966 – November 4, 1970
- Preceded by: District Created
- Succeeded by: Thomas Carter; Wayland Cross

Personal details
- Born: October 16, 1911 Limestone County, Alabama, US
- Died: November 12, 1988 (aged 77) Limestone County, Alabama, US
- Party: Democratic
- Spouse: Mary Catherine Johnson (m. 1935–1988)
- Children: 3

Karl Edward Burgreen (October 16, 1911 – November 12, 1988), also known as Edward Burgreen, was an American politician who served in the Alabama House of Representatives from 1966 to 1970.

== Life ==
Burgreen was born on October 16, 1911, in Limestone County, Alabama to Karl Roland Burgreen and Lizzie Etta Stewart. On December 19, 1935, he married Mary Catherine Johnson. They had 3 children, 2 girls and 1 boy. In 1944, he served as a member of the Limestone County Board of Revenue, where he would stay for 4 years.

He died on November 12, 1988, at the age of 77.
