= Nelson R. Starkey Jr. =

American politician

Nelson Rivers Starkey Jr.

Member of the Alabama House of Representatives from the 1st district
- In office January 3, 1984 – December 15, 2005
- Preceded by: Charles F. Ashley
- Succeeded by: Tammy Irons

Member of the Alabama House of Representatives from the 2nd district
- In office November 8, 1978 – January 3, 1984
- Preceded by: Robert M. Hill Jr.
- Succeeded by: Tom Coburn

Personal details
- Born: June 24, 1929 Tuscaloosa County, Alabama, U.S.
- Died: December 15, 2005 (aged 76) Florence, Alabama, U.S.
- Party: Democratic
- Spouse: Anne Starkey
- Children: 3

Nelson R. Starkey Jr. (June 24, 1929 – December 15, 2005) was an American politician who served in the Alabama House of Representatives from November 1978 until his death in December 2005.

== Politics ==
He served his first term in the Alabama House of Representatives in 1978.

He represented District 2 from 1978 until 1984, where he was redistricted to District 1. He served in that district from 1984 until his death in 2005.
