= Matt Woods (politician) =

American politician from Alabama (born 1982)

Member of the Alabama Senate from the 5th district
- Incumbent
- Assumed office June 27, 2025
- Preceded by: Greg Reed

Member of the Alabama House of Representatives from the 13th district
- In office November 9, 2022 – June 27, 2025
- Preceded by: Connie Cooner Rowe
- Succeeded by: Greg Barnes

Personal details
- Born: May 10, 1982 (age 44)
- Party: Republican
- Spouse: Brandi
- Children: Camden
- Education: Bevill State Community College (A.A.), Auburn University (B.A.)

Matt Woods (born May 10, 1982) is an American politician who has served as a member of the Alabama Senate, representing the 5th district since 2025. He previously served as a member of the Alabama House of Representatives representing the 13th district from 2022 to 2025.

== Early life ==
Woods was born to Jimmy and Debbie Woods. His father, Jim Woods, was a coal miner, and after he was laid off, he started an auto sales business. He graduated from Oakman High School in 2000, and then attended Bevill State Community College, receiving his associate degree in liberal arts and sciences in 2002. Woods graduated from Auburn University with his bachelor's degree in business administration in 2004. He owns Jasper Auto Sales with his father and served as chairman of the Walker County Chamber of Commerce and as a board member of the Alabama Community College System.

== Alabama House of Representatives ==
He was elected on November 8, 2022, in the 2022 Alabama House of Representatives election against Libertarian opponent Mark Davenport. He assumed office November 9, 2022. In the legislature, he sponsored the Alabama Child Protection Act, which made it a crime to possess, share, or create child sexual abuse material.

== Alabama State Senate ==
In 2025, after State Senator Greg Reed was appointed Secretary of the Alabama Department of Workforce, Woods ran a special election to succeed him in the 5th district. He won the Republican nomination unopposed, and defeated Ryan Cagle, the Democratic nominee, in the general election with 86 percent of the vote. Woods was elected to the Alabama Senate in a June 2025 special election.

Alabama House of Representatives
Preceded by Connie Cooner Rowe	Member of the Alabama House of Representatives; 2022–2025	Succeeded by Greg Barnes
Alabama Senate
Preceded by Greg Reed	Member of the Alabama Senate; 2025–present	Succeeded by incumbent
