= James H. Haygood =

American politician

James Howard Haygood

Member of the Alabama House of Representatives from the 1st district
- In office November 9, 1966 – November 4, 1970
- Preceded by: District Created
- Succeeded by: Ronnie Flippo

Personal details
- Born: January 10, 1924 Lauderdale County, Alabama
- Died: July 27, 2010 (aged 86) Lauderdale County, Alabama
- Party: Democratic
- Spouse: Pauline Hurst (m. 1943)
- Children: 3 (as of 1967)
- Parent(s): Jessie J. Haygood (1891-1985); Mary L. Killen (1894-1981)

James H. Haygood (January 10, 1924 - July 27, 2010) was an American politician who served in the Alabama House of Representatives from 1966 to 1970.

== Life ==
Haygood was born on January 10, 1924, to Jessie J. Haygood and Mary L. Killen. He graduated from Central High School. He registered for the U.S. Navy on June 30, 1942. On September 6, 1943, he married Pauline Hurst in Colbert, Alabama. He died on July 27, 2010, at the age of 86.

== Politics ==
He was elected for the first seat of District 1 of the Alabama House of Representatives in 1966 and served from 1966 to 1970. He didn't serve in any other politics.
