= Norman Crow =

American politician

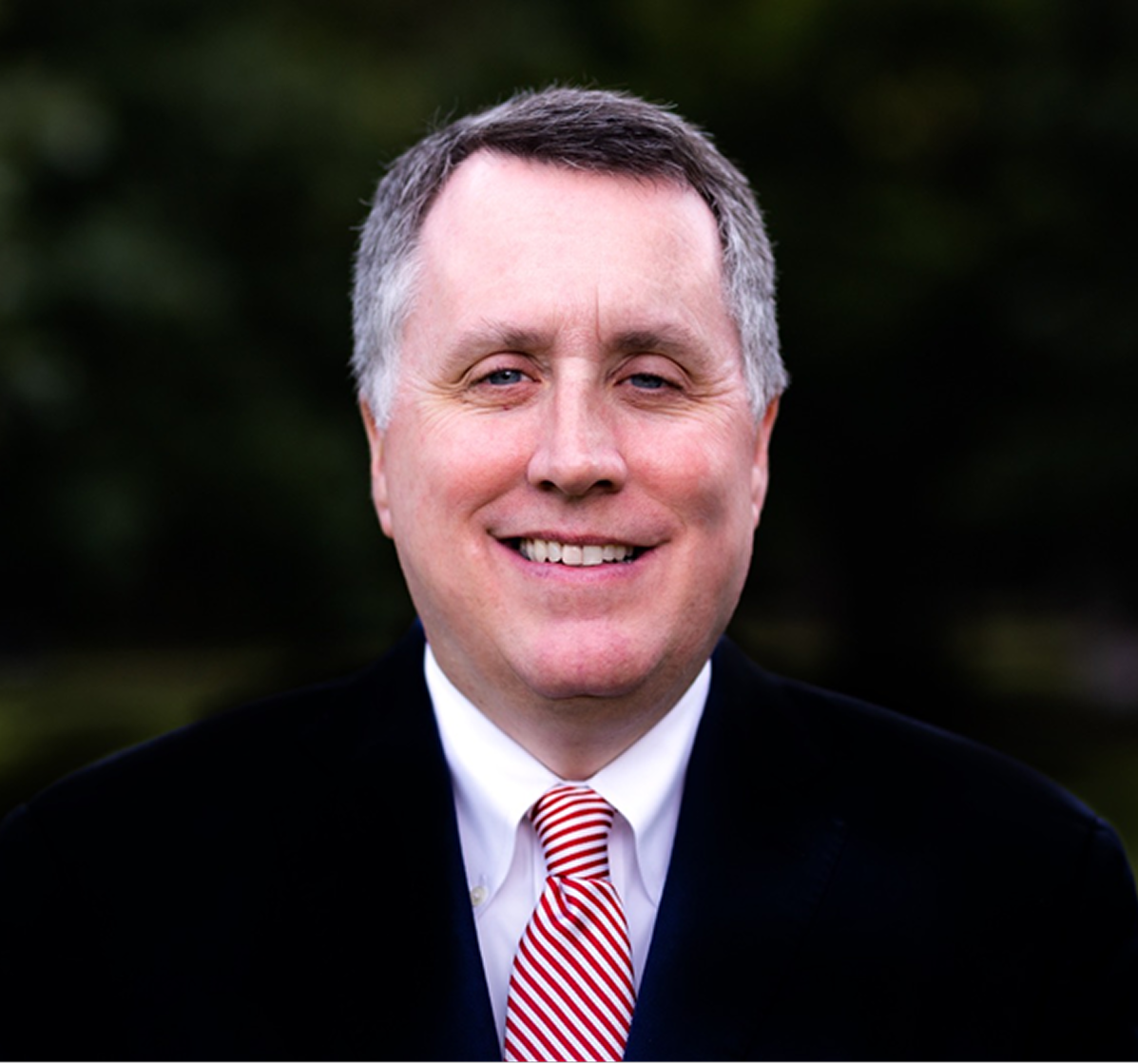

Member of the Alabama House of Representatives from the 63rd district
- Incumbent
- Assumed office January 14, 2026
- Preceded by: Cynthia Almond

Personal details
- Party: Republican
- Website: normancrow.com

Norman Crow is a Republican member of the Alabama House of Representatives. In 2026, he was elected in a special election. He previously represented District 3 on the Tuscaloosa City Council.
