= Mike Elliott (American politician) =

American politician

Member of the Alabama House of Representatives from the 13th district
- Incumbent
- Assumed office November 3, 2026
- Preceded by: Greg Barnes

Personal details
- Party: Republican

Mike Elliott is an American politician. A member of the Republican Party, he is the member for the 13th district of the Alabama House of Representatives.
