= Isaac Whorton =

American politician

Member of the Alabama House of Representatives from the 38th district
- In office November 5, 2014 – November 7, 2018
- Preceded by: DuWayne Bridges
- Succeeded by: Debbie Wood

Personal details
- Born: March 29, 1980 (age 46) Valley, Alabama
- Party: Republican

Isaac Whorton (born March 29, 1980) is an American politician who served as a Republican in the Alabama House of Representatives from the 38th district from 2014 to 2018.

== Electoral history ==
2014 Alabama House of Representatives District 38 Republican primary
Party	Candidate	Votes	%
Republican	Isaac Whorton	2,578	56.4%
Republican	Randy Price	1,989	43.6%
Total votes		4,567	100.0%

2014 Alabama House of Representatives District 38 election
Party	Candidate	Votes	%
Republican	Isaac Whorton	7,279	98.47%
Write-in		113	1.53%
Total votes		7,392	100.0%
Republican hold			
