= DuWayne Bridges =

American politician (1946–2026)

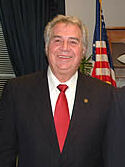
- Bridges in 2006

Member of the Alabama House of Representatives from the 38th district
- In office 2000–2014
- Preceded by: Bill Fuller
- Succeeded by: Isaac Whorton

Personal details
- Born: June 10, 1946 Shawnee, Oklahoma, U.S.
- Died: May 13, 2026 (aged 79)
- Party: Republican
- Spouse: Pat
- Children: 2
- Education: Faulkner University; Troy State University

DuWayne H. Bridges (June 10, 1946 – May 13, 2026) was an American politician who was a Republican member of the Alabama House of Representatives, where he represented the 38th District from 2000 to 2014.

== Life and career ==
Bridges was born in Shawnee, Oklahoma on June 10, 1946, and resided in Valley, Alabama. He graduated from Faulkner University in 1990 with a bachelor's degree in business administration and from Troy State University (now Troy University) in 1992 with a master's degree in human resource management. Bridge and his wife Pat have two children (DuWayne Jr. and Karen) and eight grandchildren. He was a member of the Assembly of God church.

Bridges died May 13, 2026, at the age of 79.
