= Tammy Irons =

American politician (born 1963)

Member of the Alabama Senate from the 1st district
- In office November 3, 2010 – November 5, 2014
- Preceded by: Bobby E. Denton
- Succeeded by: Tim Melson

Member of the Alabama House of Representatives from the 1st district
- In office January 3, 2007 – January 3, 2011
- Preceded by: Nelson R. Starkey Jr.
- Succeeded by: Greg Burdine

Personal details
- Born: October 21, 1963 (age 62) Florence, Alabama
- Party: Democratic
- Spouse: Curley Hallman (b. 1947)
- Education: University of North Alabama, University of Memphis
- Profession: attorney

Tammy Irons (born October 21, 1963) is an American politician who served as a Democratic member of the Alabama State Senate, representing the 1st District from 2006, after a special election, until 2014. The district includes Florence.

== Personal ==
Irons received her B.S. in accounting from the University of North Alabama and her Juris Doctor degree from the University of Memphis.

After law school, Irons served as a judicial law clerk for the Tennessee Court of Appeals. She is a business attorney and owns the Irons Law Firm. Irons is a member of various boards including the Shoals Entrepreneurial Center; Shoals Economic Development Authority; SafePlace, Inc. and the Boys and Girls Clubs. She is president of the Lauderdale County Bar Association and a member of the President's Cabinet at the University of North Alabama.

Irons is a member of the Sherrod Avenue Church of Christ. She is married to Curley Hallman, the former football coach at Southern Miss (1988–90) and LSU (1991–94).

== Political career ==
In March 2006, Irons defeated Republican Florence attorney William Smith in a special election to fill the Alabama House seat left vacant after the death of long-time Representative Nelson Starkey. Irons went on later that year to defeat Smith again in the regularly scheduled general election to hold the office for a full term.

In 2008, Irons was touted as a possible Democratic contender to replace retiring U.S. Representative Bud Cramer (5th District of Alabama), but after much consideration, she chose not to run.

Irons was elected to the State Senate November 2, 2010 to replace retiring Sen. Bobby Denton.
