= Ben Harrison (politician) =

American politician

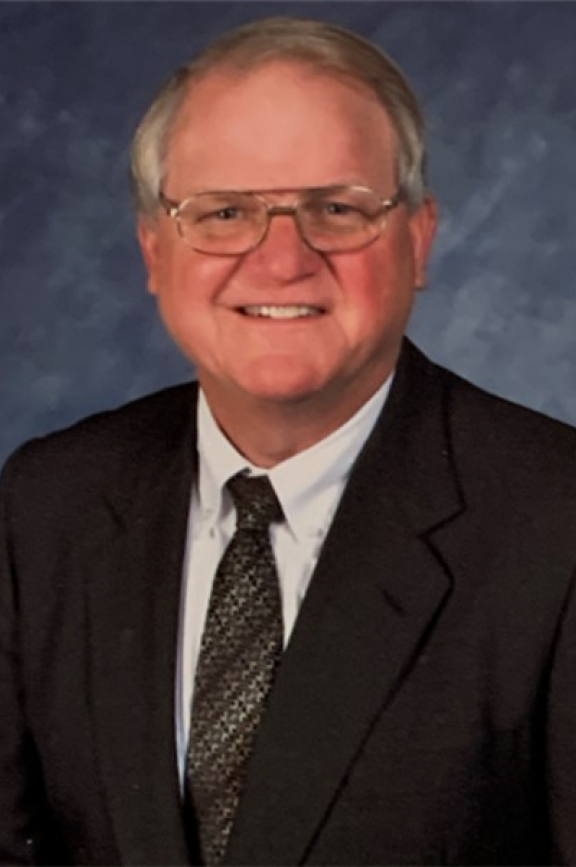

Member of the Alabama House of Representatives from the 2nd district
- Incumbent
- Assumed office November 9, 2022
- Preceded by: Lynn Greer

Personal details
- Party: Republican
- Spouse: Beth McGuire Harrison
- Children: 4
- Education: Auburn University

Ben Harrison is an American politician who has served as a Republican member of the Alabama House of Representatives since November 8, 2022. He represents Alabama's 2nd House of Representatives district.

== Electoral history ==
He was elected on November 8, 2022, in the 2022 Alabama House of Representatives election unopposed. He assumed office the next day on November 9, 2022.

== Biography ==
Harrison graduated from West Limestone High School in 1978. Harrison is a Christian.

Alabama House of Representatives
Preceded by Lynn Greer	Member of the Alabama House of Representatives; 2022–present	Succeeded by incumbent
