= Heath Allbright =

American politician

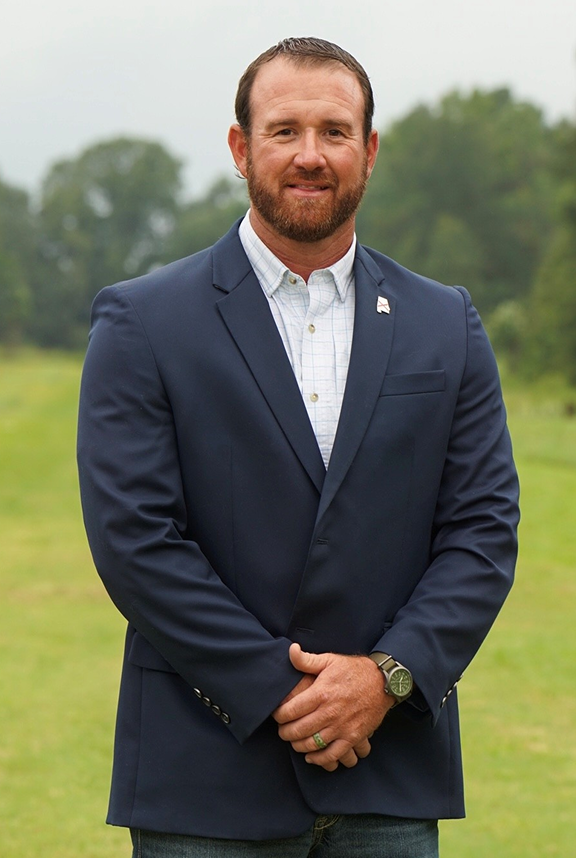

Member of the Alabama House of Representatives from the 11th district
- Incumbent
- Assumed office August 27, 2025
- Preceded by: Randall Shedd

Personal details
- Party: Republican

Heath Allbright is an American politician who has served as a member of the Alabama House of Representatives since 2025. He is a member of the Alabama Republican Party.

== Career ==
Allbright served on the Cullman County Board of Education. In 2025, he chose to run in a special election to replace Randall Shedd, who resigned in February. He defeated Don Fallin in the Republican primary on May 13, 2025. His campaign was supported by the Business Council of Alabama, the Alabama Forestry Association, and the Alabama Farmers Federation. In the general election, he defeated Alexandria Braswell on August 26, 2025.

== Political positions ==
Allbright is in favor of cutting the state income tax. During a forum, he stated his support for book bans on a local level for "sexually explicit books," his opposition to transgender athletes, and that he has read about the chemtrail conspiracy theory and would support regulation against it.
