= Debbie Wood =

American politician

Member of the Alabama House of Representatives from the 38th district
- In office November 8, 2018 – July 31, 2025
- Preceded by: Isaac Whorton
- Succeeded by: Kristin Nelson

Personal details
- Born: May 25, 1961 (age 65)
- Party: Republican
- Spouse: Bobby
- Children: 2

Debbie Wood (born May 25, 1965) is an American politician from Alabama. Wood is a former Republican member of the Alabama House of Representatives from the 38th district, serving from 2018 to 2025.

== Early life and career ==
Wood owns a real estate business in Valley, AL. She is a member of Langdale United Methodist Church.

== Political career ==
Wood ran against the chairman of the county commission in Chambers County in 2002 and was the first female elected to represent District 6. She would later become the first female to serve as the chairperson for the County Commission. She served 4 terms and Wood ran for the House seat after the incumbent, Isaac Whorton, announced he was running for circuit judge. Wood defeated fellow Republican Todd Rauch by 8 votes in the state's July primary runoff. She defeated Democrat Brian McGee in the November 2018 general election. Wood resigned in July 2025 after relocating to Florida.
