= Cynthia Almond =

American attorney and politician

President of the Alabama Public Service Commission
- Incumbent
- Assumed office June 16, 2025
- Governor: Kay Ivey
- Preceded by: Twinkle Andress Cavanaugh

Member of the Alabama House of Representatives from the 63rd district
- In office October 20, 2021 – June 16, 2025
- Preceded by: Bill Poole
- Succeeded by: Norman Crow

Personal details
- Born: 1964 or 1965 (age 60–61) Tuscaloosa, Alabama, U.S.
- Party: Republican
- Children: 2
- Education: Vanderbilt University (attended); University of Alabama (BA, JD)

Cynthia Lee Almond (born 1964/1965 in Tuscaloosa, Alabama) is an American attorney and politician serving as the president of the Alabama Public Service Commission. She previously served as a member of the Alabama House of Representatives from the 63rd district.

== Early life and education ==
Almond was born in Tuscaloosa Alabama and is the daughter of Jimmy Lee, a former Alabama State Legislator. Almond began undergrad at Vanderbilt University, and she earned a Bachelor of Arts degree in history and Spanish from the University of Alabama and a Juris Doctor from the University of Alabama School of Law.

== Career ==
Almond has operated an independent law firm since 2008. From 2005 to 2021, she served as a member of the Tuscaloosa City Council from the first district. Almond later worked as a dean of the University of Alabama School of Law. She was elected to the Alabama House of Representatives in 2021, succeeding Bill Poole.

In 2023, Almond was the sole Republican "nay" for an anti-ESG bill that passed in a 74-27 vote.

On June 6, 2025, Almond was appointed as the Alabama Public Service Commission president by Kay Ivey.

Political offices
Preceded by Twinkle Andress Cavanaugh	President of the Alabama Public Service Commission; 2025–present	Incumbent
