= Greg Barnes =

American politician

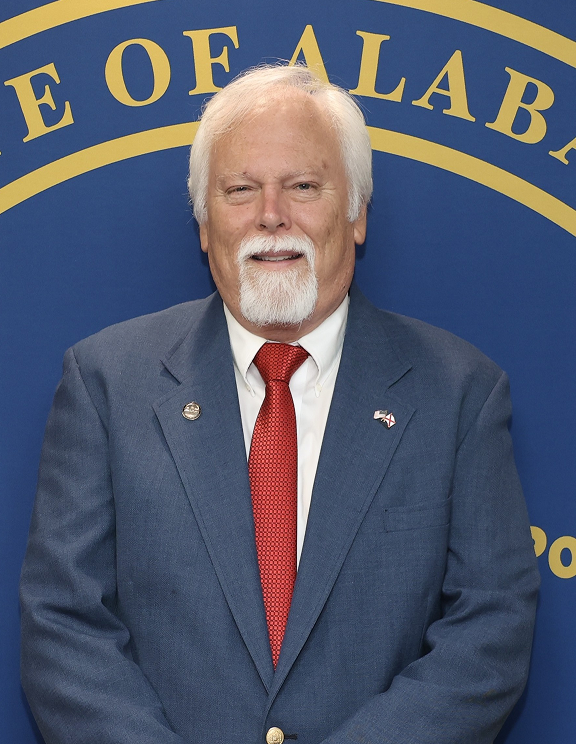

Member of the Alabama House of Representatives from the 13th district
- In office October 1, 2025 – November 3, 2026
- Preceded by: Matt Woods
- Succeeded by: Mike Elliott

Personal details
- Born: 1957 or 1958 (age 68–69)
- Party: Republican

Greg Barnes (born 1957 or 1958) is an American politician who has served as the representative for Alabama's 13th House of Representatives district since 2025. He is a member of the Alabama Republican Party. He formerly resided in Decatur, AL which is located in Morgan County.

== Career ==
Barnes first ran for state house in 2022, where he was defeated by incumbent Matt Woods. After Woods was elected to the Alabama Senate in a special election, Barnes announced his candidacy to run for the Republican nomination in the seat that Woods was vacating. He pledged to take no donations from anyone, including corporate political action committees. After no Democrat filed to run, Barnes was elected by winning the Republican primary on September 30, 2025.

Barnes was defeated in the 2026 Republican primary by Mike Elliott, who had been disqualified in the earlier special election. Barnes received 42% of the vote.
