= Marcel Black =

American Democratic Party politician

Member of the Alabama House of Representatives from the 3rd district
- In office November 9, 1994 – November 7, 2018
- Preceded by: J.W. Goodwin
- Succeeded by: Andrew Sorrell

Member of the Alabama House of Representatives from the 2nd district
- In office November 7, 1990 – November 9, 1994
- Preceded by: Tom C. Coburn
- Succeeded by: James H. Hamilton

Personal details
- Born: March 25, 1951 (age 75)
- Party: Democratic
- Spouse: Martha Rose Tubb
- Children: 2
- Education: University of Alabama
- Occupation: Politician, attorney

Marcel Black (born March 25, 1951) is an American Democratic Party politician who was a member of the Alabama House of Representatives from 1990 to 2018. He represented the 3rd district for most of his tenure.

Outside politics, he is an attorney with the company Black and Hughston, P.C..

== Life ==
Black was born on March 25, 1951. He is married to Martha Rose Tubb and has two children.

== Politics ==
Black was elected for District 2 for only one term, from November 1990 to November 1994.

He represented District 3 for most of his tenure, from 1995 to 2018. He announced that he would be retiring at the end of the term.

He was the ranking minority member on the financial services committee and the education policy committee.
