= Phillip Pettus =

American politician

Member of the Alabama House of Representatives from the 1st district
- Incumbent
- Assumed office November 4, 2014
- Preceded by: Greg Burdine
- Succeeded by: Maurice McCaney

Personal details
- Born: Phillip James Pettus; February 26, 1962 (age 64)
- Party: Republican
- Spouse: Mary Pettus (m. 1985)
- Children: 3

Phillip James Pettus is an American politician. He serves as a Republican member of the Alabama House of Representatives.

== Education ==
Pettus attended Shelby State Community College and University of North Alabama.

== Career ==
Pettus was first elected in 2014.

In 2017, Pettus announced that he would be running for the 2018–2022 term. He won with 62.6% of the vote in the general election.

== Personal life ==
Pettus's wife is Mary. They have three children.
