= Greg Reed =

American politician

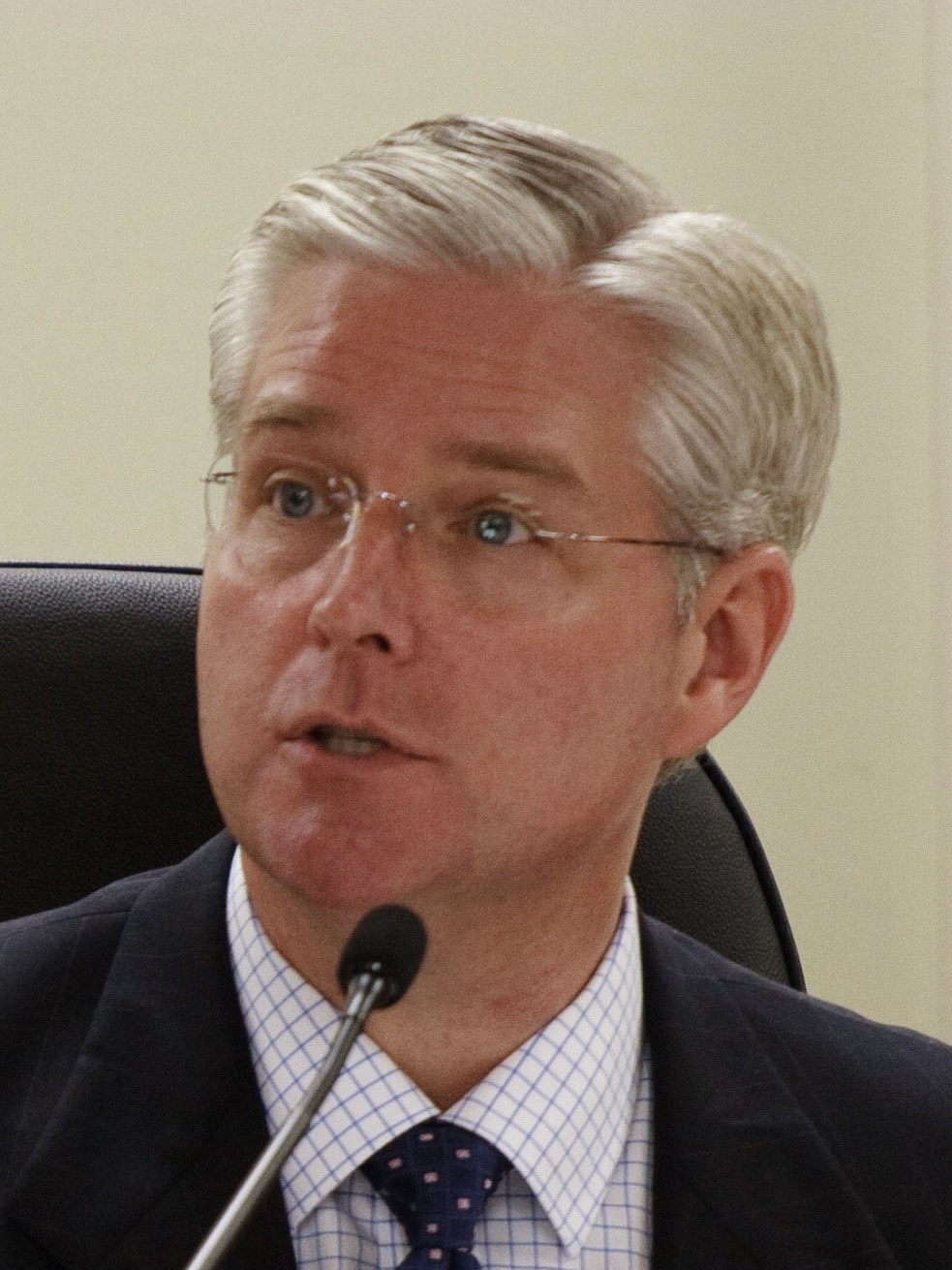
- Reed in 2012

Secretary of the Alabama Department of Workforce
- Incumbent
- Assumed office January 1, 2025

President pro tempore of the Alabama Senate
- In office February 2, 2021 – January 1, 2025
- Preceded by: Del Marsh
- Succeeded by: Garlan Gudger

Majority Leader of the Alabama Senate
- In office November 6, 2014 – February 2, 2021
- Preceded by: Jabo Waggoner
- Succeeded by: Clay Scofield

Member of the Alabama Senate from the 5th district
- In office November 3, 2010 – January 1, 2025
- Preceded by: Charles Bishop
- Succeeded by: Matt Woods

Personal details
- Born: June 5, 1965 (age 61) Jasper, Alabama, U.S.
- Party: Republican
- Spouse: Mitsy Reed
- Children: 3
- Education: University of Alabama, Tuscaloosa (BA)

Greg Reed (born June 5, 1965) is an American politician. He served as a Republican member of the Alabama Senate, representing the 5th District between 2010 and 2024. He defeated Democrat Brett Wadsworth in the 2010 midterm elections to replace Charles Bishop in the 5th District. Senator Reed served as the Alabama State Senate's president pro tempore from 2021 until he stepped down in November 2024 to join Governor Kay Ivey’s administration as Senior Advisor to Workforce Transformation.

== Early political activities ==
In 2010, Greg Reed was elected to the Alabama State Senate as a first time candidate. He was re-elected in 2014 without opposition, and during the next legislative session was elected by his fellow Republican Senate members to serve as Majority Leader of the Alabama Senate. At the start of the 2021 legislative session, the entire Alabama Senate unanimously elected Reed to serve as the new President Pro Tempore.

== Legislation ==
During his tenure, he sponsored and passed Medicaid reform legislation that created Regional Care Organizations (RCOs). RCOs are self-sustaining managed care organizations that receive a capitated amount from Alabama Medicaid each year to provide services to Medicaid recipients within the RCO's geographical area. During the 2015 legislative session, Reed continued his Medicaid spearheaded legislation to create Integrated Care Networks (ICNs). The legislation allows ICNs to contract with Medicaid to provide long-term care under a capitated system. Alabama Medicaid estimates it will save taxpayers $1.5 billion over the first ten years.

In May 2019, he voted to make abortion a crime at any stage in a pregnancy, with no exemptions for cases of rape or incest.

== Education ==
Reed graduated from Walker County public schools, and attended Walker Community College. He later earned a bachelor’s degree at the University of Alabama.

== Awards ==
The Alabama Association of Resource, Conservation and Development (AARCD) Councils named Reed the 2015 Senate Leader of the Year at their annual meeting in April 2015.

In 2019 Reed received the Legislator of the Year award from the Economic Development Association of Alabama (EDAA).

== Personal life ==
Greg Reed was born in Jasper, Alabama, and spent his childhood in south Walker County. He married Mitsy Harbison in 1988. Together they have three sons, Andrew, James, and John Michael. Reed and his wife are members of the First Baptist Church of Jasper.

Alabama Senate
Preceded by J. T. Waggoner	Majority Leader of the Alabama Senate; 2014–2021	Succeeded by Clay Scofield
Preceded by Del Marsh	President pro tempore of the Alabama Senate; 2021–2025	Succeeded by Garlan Gudger
