= Bill Poole =

American politician

Director of the Alabama Department of Finance
- Incumbent
- Assumed office August 1, 2021

Member of the Alabama House of Representatives from the 63rd district
- In office 2011–2021
- Preceded by: Robert J. Bentley
- Succeeded by: Cynthia Almond

Personal details
- Born: William Stitt Poole III; May 1, 1975 (age 50) New Orleans, Louisiana, US
- Party: Republican
- Education: University of Alabama (BS, JD)

William Stitt Poole III (born May 1, 1975) is an American attorney and politician who served as a member of the Alabama House of Representatives for the 63rd district from 2011 to 2021.

== Early life and education ==
Poole was born in New Orleans, Louisiana, and was raised in Dayton, Alabama. He earned a Bachelor of Science degree in business management from the University of Alabama in 1997 and a Juris Doctor from the University of Alabama School of Law in 2004.

== Career ==
After graduating from law school, he took a job as a civil attorney for the city of Tuscaloosa, Alabama. He became a city attorney and prosecutor for Brookwood, Alabama, and also worked for the Pharmaceutical Research and Manufacturers of America and as a staff assistant to the House Ways and Means Committee in the United States House of Representatives. Selected as a member of the Presidential Leadership Scholars for the class of 2025.

In 2010, Poole ran for the 63rd district of the Alabama House of Representatives which was represented by Robert J. Bentley. Poole defeated attorney John Fisher for the Republican Party nomination, and Democratic professor Susan Pace Hamill in the general election.

In 2013, House Speaker Mike Hubbard appointed Poole as chair of the House Ways and Means Education Committee. Following Hubbard's criminal conviction in 2016, Poole considered running for speaker, though he opted against it. After Donald Trump announced that he selected United States Senator Jeff Sessions of Alabama to become United States attorney general, Bentley considered appointing Poole to the position.

== Personal life ==
He and his wife, Niccole, have two children. Poole's father, Bill II, served as a city attorney for Demopolis, Alabama.
