= Cindy Myrex =

American politician

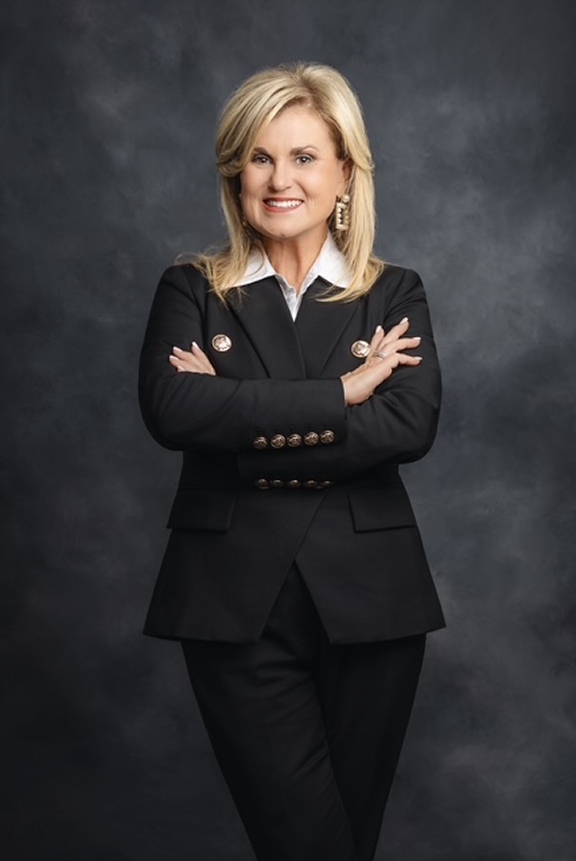

Member of the Alabama House of Representatives from the 12th district
- Incumbent
- Assumed office October 29, 2025
- Preceded by: Corey Harbison

Personal details
- Party: Republican
- Education: Wallace State Community College

Cindy Myrex is an American politician who has served as a member of the Alabama House of Representatives since 2025. She is a member of the Alabama Republican Party.

== Career ==
Myrex first announced that she would run for a vacant seat in the state house in March 2025, following the resignation of Corey Harbison. In a campaign ad, she noted her twenty-year career as a realtor. She advanced from the Republican primary on July 15, 2025, and subsequently won the primary runoff election on August 12 with 58% of the vote. She defeated the Democratic nominee, Matthew Glover, in the general election on October 28 with 87% of the vote.
