= Corey Harbison =

American politician

Member of the Alabama House of Representatives from the 12th district
- In office November 5, 2014 – April 15, 2025
- Preceded by: Mac Buttram
- Succeeded by: Cindy Myrex

Personal details
- Born: April 11, 1986 (age 40) Good Hope, Alabama, U.S.
- Party: Republican

Corey Harbison (born April 11, 1986) is an American politician who served in the Alabama House of Representatives, representing the 12th district from 2014 to 2025. He is a member of the Republican Party.

Harbison resigned on April 15, 2025; his successor will be chosen in the 2025 Alabama House of Representatives District 12 special election.
