= Charles Bishop (Alabama politician) =

American politician

27th Agriculture Commissioner of Alabama
- In office 1999–2003
- Governor: Don Siegelman
- Preceded by: Jack Thompson
- Succeeded by: Ron Sparks

Member of the Alabama Senate from the 5th district
- In office 2006 – November 3, 2010
- Preceded by: Curt Lee
- Succeeded by: Greg Reed
- In office 1983–1991
- Preceded by: Robert B. Hall
- Succeeded by: Robert T. "Bob" Wilson, Jr.

Personal details
- Born: Moro Bay, Arkansas
- Party: Republican; Democratic (formerly)
- Spouse: Cynthia
- Profession: Farmer

Charles Bishop was a Republican member of the Alabama Senate, representing the 5th District from 2006 to November 3, 2010. He did not seek re-election in 2010. The district covers portions of Jefferson, Tuscaloosa, Walker and Winston counties. He was succeeded by fellow Republican Greg Reed.

== Career ==
As a Democrat, Bishop served in the Alabama State Senate from 1983 to 1991. He ran unsuccessfully for his party's nomination for governor in 1990 and 2002. He was elected as Commissioner of the Alabama Department of Agriculture and Industries for the term from 1999 to 2003. Bishop switched to the Republican Party before the election in 2006.

Bishop made national news in June 2007 when he hit fellow Senator Lowell Barron, a Democrat, while on the Senate floor. According to the Birmingham News Bishop claims that Barron called him a "son of a bitch" while the Senate was in recess during an "animated conversation." Bishop was offended by this, as he said "Where I lived, if someone called you that, they are talking about your mother."

Barron, in a Fox News report, denied saying that. He said Bishop had used an expletive to him and he was trying to get away when he was hit by Bishop on the side of the head near an ear. Bishop reported that he hit Barron with his right arm, hitting him anywhere. Patrick Harris, assistant secretary of the Senate, saw the attack and restrained Bishop. Videos of the punch can be found by searching for "Bishop's Bam in Bama." The Senate later considered censuring Bishop and expelling him from the chamber for the remainder of the day, but Bishop said that wasn't necessary and walked out of the Statehouse. Though a Senate Committee of Investigation was formed, no official action was taken. He lost his next primary.

In 2008, Bishop gave a speech before the National Conference of the Council of Conservative Citizens, a white supremacist organization.

He unsuccessfully sought the Republican nomination for a seat in the Alabama House of Representatives in 2010.

Party political offices
Preceded by A. W. Todd	Democratic nominee for Agriculture Commissioner of Alabama; 1998	Succeeded by Ron Sparks
