= Mike Curtis (politician) =

American politician

Member of the Alabama House of Representatives from the 2nd district
- In office November 8, 2006 - November 3, 2010
- Preceded by: Lynn Greer
- Succeeded by: Lynn Greer

Personal details
- Party: Democratic
- Spouse: Janice
- Education: University of North Alabama
- Occupation: insurance agent

Mike Curtis was a Democratic member of the Alabama House of Representatives, representing the 2nd District from November 2006 to November 2010. The district includes part of Lauderdale County. He was defeated for re-election in November, 2010.

== Biography ==
Mike Curtis graduated from Rogers High School, Greenhill, Alabama in 1973 and graduated from the University of North Alabama in Florence in 1977. In 1998, Representative Curtis graduated the County Commission College. He is currently the JAG Specialist at Central High School.

He served on the Lauderdale County Commission from 1996 until 2006.

Among Representative Curtis' civic activities; Volunteer Coach for Alabama Special Olympics and Advisory Board for Shoals Special Olympics, Player Host for the Harlon Hill Trophy, Board of Directors for the Division II Hall of Fame, Board member of the Retired Senior Volunteer Program (RSVP), Member of Lauderdale County Career Technical Advisory Committee, Board of Directors of the Shoals National Championship Committee, Member 2002-2003 Public Works & Rural Transportation Steering Committee Association of County Commissioners, Former Member a Board of Trustees of the Association of County Commissions of Alabama liability Self-Insurance Fund, Board of Directors of 911, and Board of Directors of Association of County Commissions of Alabama

Representative Curtis is married to Janice Curtis, who is a special education teacher at Rogers High School. They have twin daughters, Britney and Mellany, and a son, Bryce. Additionally, Representative Curtis has two sons-in-law; Luke Underwood and Kane Lancaster, as well as five grandsons; Brodie, Maddox, Carter, Brenton and Tripp.

Representative Curtis is a member of Atlas Church of Christ.

== Election 2006 ==
In 2006, Mike Curtis of Greenhill was the sole Democrat to challenge Republican State Representative Lynn Greer of Rogersville. Greer was the first Republican to win an elected public office in Lauderdale County, Alabama. Greer chose to retire rather than face a sure-to-be-grueling contest against the popular County Commissioner Curtis. The first and only Republican to qualify to face Curtis was a used car salesman from Rogersville, Packey Grisham. However, months after qualifying ended, Grisham dropped out of the race leaving only Curtis to seek the state House seat. Within weeks, the county GOP nominated Mary Pettus, also of Greenhill, to face Curtis in the general election. Pettus was the Democratic nominee for the House seat in 2002; she was defeated by Republican Lynn Greer. In the 2006 race, Curtis easily defeated Pettus and is currently serving as the State Representative for Lauderdale County District 2.
