= Charles F. Ashley =

American politician (1936–2011)

Member of the Alabama House of Representatives from the 1st district
- In office November 3, 1982 – November 9, 1983
- Preceded by: John E. Higginbotham
- Succeeded by: Nelson R. Starkey Jr.

Personal details
- Born: November 9, 1936 Alabama, US
- Died: March 4, 2011 (aged 74)
- Party: Democratic
- Spouse: Louise Canerday Ashley (1938-?)
- Children: 3

Charles F. Ashley (November 9, 1936 – March 4, 2011) was an American politician who served in the Alabama House of Representatives from 1982 to 1983.

== Life ==
Ashley was born on November 9, 1936, in Alabama to Charles Ashley Jr. and Mamie Ludell Stevenson. His father died when Charles was around 20 years old. At some point, he married Louise Canerday Ashley and had three children. He died on March 4, 2011, at the age of 74.

== Politics ==
=== 1982 Election ===
Ashley was one of three candidates running in the Democratic primary. He won with 54% of the vote. It was only him and an independent running for this seat because no Republican candidates have even ran since the 1966 election. He won the general election with 76% of the votes.
