= Alabama's 1st House of Representatives district =

American legislative district

Alabama's 1st State House of Representatives district
Representative
Phillip Pettus; R–Killen

Alabama's 1st House of Representatives district is one of 105 districts in the Alabama House of Representatives. Its current representative is Phillip Pettus. This district was created in 1966 and encompasses parts of Lauderdale County. It is still in use today.

== Representatives ==
Representative	Party	Term start	Term end	Electoral history	Represented counties
District created			November 9, 1966		
James H. Haygood	Democratic	November 9, 1966	November 4, 1970	Elected in 1966	Lauderdale
Robert M. Hill Jr.	Democratic	November 9, 1966	November 4, 1970	Elected in 1966	Lauderdale
Robert M. Hill Jr.	Democratic	November 4, 1970	November 6, 1974	Elected in 1970	Lauderdale
Ronnie Flippo	Democratic	November 4, 1970	November 6, 1974	Elected in 1970	Lauderdale
Lynn Greer	Democratic	November 6, 1974	November 8, 1978	Elected in 1974; Elected in 1978; Resigned	Lauderdale
Lynn Greer	Democratic	November 8, 1978	June 1, 1981	Elected in 1974; Elected in 1978; Resigned	Lauderdale
Vacant		June 1, 1981	July 14, 1981		Lauderdale
John E. Higginbotham	Democratic	July 14, 1981	Abt. 1982	Resigned	Lauderdale
Vacant		Abt. 1982	November 3, 1982		[data missing]
Charles F. Ashley	Democratic	November 3, 1982	November 9, 1983	Elected in 1982	[data missing]
Nelson R. Starkey Jr.	Democratic	November 9, 1983	November 5, 1986	Elected in 1983; Elected in 1986; Elected in 1990; Elected in 1994; Elected in 1998; Elected in 2002; Died	[data missing]
Nelson R. Starkey Jr.	Democratic	November 5, 1986	November 7, 1990	Elected in 1983; Elected in 1986; Elected in 1990; Elected in 1994; Elected in 1998; Elected in 2002; Died	[data missing]
Nelson R. Starkey Jr.	Democratic	November 7, 1990	November 9, 1994	Elected in 1983; Elected in 1986; Elected in 1990; Elected in 1994; Elected in 1998; Elected in 2002; Died	[data missing]
Nelson R. Starkey Jr.	Democratic	November 9, 1994	November 4, 1998	Elected in 1983; Elected in 1986; Elected in 1990; Elected in 1994; Elected in 1998; Elected in 2002; Died	Lauderdale (part)
Nelson R. Starkey Jr.	Democratic	November 4, 1998	November 6, 2002	Elected in 1983; Elected in 1986; Elected in 1990; Elected in 1994; Elected in 1998; Elected in 2002; Died	Lauderdale (part)
Nelson R. Starkey Jr.	Democratic	November 6, 2002	December 15, 2005	Elected in 1983; Elected in 1986; Elected in 1990; Elected in 1994; Elected in 1998; Elected in 2002; Died	Lauderdale (part)
Vacant		December 15, 2005	March 21, 2006		Lauderdale (part)
Tammy L. Irons	Democratic	March 21, 2006	November 8, 2006	Elected in 2006	Lauderdale (part)
Tammy L. Irons	Democratic	November 8, 2006	November 3, 2010	Elected in 2006	Lauderdale (part)
Greg Burdine	Democratic	November 3, 2010	November 5, 2014	Elected in 2010	Lauderdale (part)
Phillip Pettus	Republican	November 5, 2014	November 7, 2018	Elected in 2014; Elected in 2018	Lauderdale (part)
Phillip Pettus	Republican	November 7, 2018	November 9, 2022	Elected in 2014; Elected in 2018	Lauderdale (part)

== General elections ==
Source: District 1 Races (1967-Present)

Year	Democratic			Republican			Other		
Year	Candidate	Votes	%	Candidate	Votes	%	Candidate	Votes	%
1966; Places; 1-2	√Robert M. Hill Jr.	9,571	36.35	Morris D. McKee	3,609	13.71	None		
1966; Places; 1-2	√James H. Haygood	9,253	35.14	Charles Hamilton	3,897	14.80	None		
1970; Places; 1-2	√Ronnie Flippo	10,948	100.00	None			None		
1970; Places; 1-2	√Robert M. Hill Jr.	10,754	100.00	None			None		
1974	√Lynn Greer	2,676	100.00	None			None		
1978	√Lynn Greer	[data missing]		None			None		
1982	√Charles Ashley	7,211	76.62	None			Bobby McQuire (Independent)	2,200	23.38
1983	√Nelson R. Starkey Jr.	2,394	74.16	Alfred McCroskey	834	25.84	None		
1986	√Nelson R. Starkey Jr.	7,764	70.76	Ken McFall	3,208	29.24	None		
1990	√Nelson R. Starkey Jr.	7,095	99.99	None			Others	1	0.01
1994	√Nelson R. Starkey Jr.	7,385	62.60	Duane Phillips	4,396	37.26	Others	17	0.14
1998	√Nelson R. Starkey Jr.	7,569	60.14	Greg Beer	5,011	39.81	Others	6	0.05
2002	√Nelson R. Starkey Jr.	8,540	62.59	William McNatt	4,772	34.98	Joey Franklin; Others	304; 28	2.23; 0.21
2006	√Tammy L. Irons	4,229	61.49	William E. Smith	2,649	38.51	None		
2006	√Tammy L. Irons	8,406	65.10	William E. Smith	4,506	34.90	None		
2010	√Greg Burdine	7,083	50.69	Quinton Hanson	6,877	49.21	Write-Ins	14	0.10
2014	Greg Burdine	4,652	48.48	√Phillip Pettus	4,933	51.41	Write-Ins	10	0.10
2018	None			√Phillip Pettus	7,348	62.57	Bobby J. Dolan III; Write-Ins	4,336; 60	36.92; 0.51
2022	None			√Phillip Pettus	10,360	97.01	Write-Ins	319	2.99
