= Alabama Department of Workforce =

Government agency in Alabama, US

Agency overview
- Formed: October 16, 2025
- Agency executive: Greg Reed, Secretary
- Website: workforce.alabama.gov

The Alabama Department of Workforce, formerly the Alabama Department of Labor is a department of the government of Alabama, renamed by governor Kay Ivey in 2025. Greg Reed currently serves as the head of the organization.
