= Randall Shedd =

American politician

Member of the Alabama House of Representatives from the 11th district
- In office 2013 – February 17, 2025
- Preceded by: Jeremy Oden
- Succeeded by: Heath Allbright

Personal details
- Born: March 5, 1953 (age 73) Arab, Alabama, U.S.
- Party: Republican
- Profession: publisher

Randall Shedd (born March 5, 1953) is an American politician. He represented the 11th district in the Alabama House of Representatives from 2013 to 2025. He is a member of the Republican Party.

On February 13, 2025, Shedd announced his plans to resign his seat to work for Alabama Senate Pro Tempore Garlan Gudger.
