= Lynn Greer (politician) =

American politician

Member of the Alabama House of Representatives
- In office November 3, 2010 – November 9, 2022
- Preceded by: Mike Curtis
- Succeeded by: Ben Harrison
- Constituency: 2nd district
- In office November 6, 2002 – November 8, 2006
- Preceded by: James H. Hamilton
- Succeeded by: Mike Curtis
- Constituency: 2nd district
- In office November 6, 1974 – June 1, 1981
- Preceded by: Ronnie Flippo
- Succeeded by: Charles F. Ashley
- Constituency: 1st district

Personal details
- Born: Bayless Lynn Greer; November 20, 1941 (age 84) Rogersville, Alabama, U.S.
- Party: Republican
- Parent(s): Gilbert J. Greer; Esther B. Nugent

Bayless Lynn Greer (born November 20, 1941) is an American politician who served in the Alabama House of Representatives from 1974 to 1981, 2002 to 2006, and 2010 to 2022.

== Politics ==
He is the incumbent of the 2nd District of the Alabama House of Representatives, serving since 2010. He is a member of the Republican Party. Greer also served in the House from 1974 to 1981 and from 2002 to 2006.
