= 2018 Alabama elections =

A general election was held in the U.S. state of Alabama on November 6, 2018. All Alabama executive officers were up for election along with all of Alabama's seven seats in the United States House of Representatives. Primary elections took place on June 5, 2018 for both major parties.

== Governor ==
Incumbent Republican governor Kay Ivey, who assumed the office upon the resignation of Robert J. Bentley in April 2017, ran for a full term against Tuscaloosa Mayor Walt Maddox and independent write-in Chad Chig Martin. Ivey won with 59% of the vote.

== Lieutenant governor ==
The office of lieutenant governor was vacant prior to the election.

State House Representative Will Ainsworth, State Senator Rusty Glover, and Public Service Commission President Twinkle Cavanaugh were running for the Republican nomination. Pastor Will Boyd from Florence ran unopposed for the Democratic nomination.

Ainsworth won the general election with 61% of the votes.

== Attorney general ==
Incumbent Republican attorney general Steve Marshall was appointed to the office by Governor Robert J. Bentley in February 2017. He ran for a full term against Joseph Siegelman, the son of former governor Don Siegelman. Marshall won with 58.8% of the vote.

== Secretary of state ==
Incumbent Republican secretary of state John Merrill ran for re-election to a second term.

== State auditor ==
Incumbent Republican state auditor Jim Zeigler ran for re-election to a second term.

== State treasurer ==
2018 Alabama State Treasurer election
- November 6, 2018
Nominee	John McMillan
Party	Republican
Popular vote	1,085,054
Percentage	97.14%
- County results McMillan: >90%
Treasurer before election
Young Boozer
Republican
Elected Treasurer
John McMillan
Republican

Incumbent Republican state treasurer Young Boozer was term-limited and could not run for re-election to a third consecutive term. No Democratic candidates filed to run for this office.

=== Republican primary ===
==== Candidates ====
- David Black, professor at the University of North Alabama.
- Stephen Evans, investment adviser.
- John McMillan, Commissioner of Agriculture and Industries.

==== Primary results ====
Republican primary results
Party	Candidate	Votes	%
Republican	John McMillan	274,157	61.18
Republican	David Black	95,723	21.36
Republican	Stephen Evans	78,262	17.46
Total votes		448,142	100

=== General election ===
2018 Alabama State Treasurer election
Party	Candidate	Votes	%
Republican	John McMillan	1,085,054	97.14
Write-in		31,968	2.86
Total votes		1,117,022	100
Republican hold			

== Commissioner of Agriculture and Industries ==
2018 Alabama Commissioner of Agriculture and Industries election
- November 6, 2018
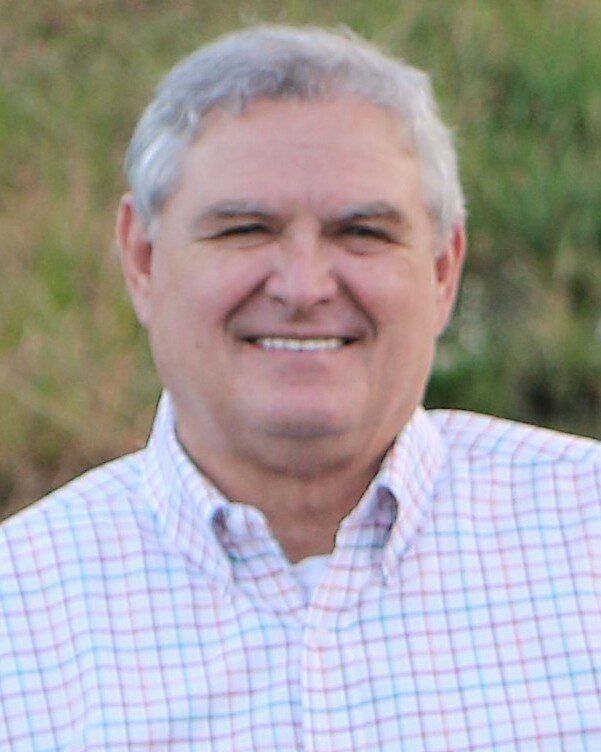
Nominee	Rick Pate
Party	Republican
Popular vote	1,081,431
Percentage	97.19%
- County results Pate: >90%
Commissioner before election
John McMillan
Republican
Elected Commissioner
Rick Pate
Republican

Incumbent Republican Commissioner of Agriculture and Industries John McMillan was term-limited and could not run for re-election to a third consecutive term. No Democratic candidates filed to run for this office.

=== Republican primary ===
==== Candidates ====
- Tracy "T.O." Crane, food security company owner and former FBI field intelligence supervisor.
- Gerald Dial, state senator.
- Cecil Murphy, farmer and retired teacher.
- Rick Pate, farmer and mayor of Lowndesboro.

==== Primary results ====
Republican primary results
Party	Candidate	Votes	%
Republican	Rick Pate	181,637	40.37
Republican	Gerald Dial	134,868	29.98
Republican	Cecil Murphy	77,363	17.20
Republican	Tracy Crane	56,007	12.45
Total votes		449,875	100

Republican primary runoff results
Party	Candidate	Votes	%
Republican	Rick Pate	176,739	56.71
Republican	Gerald Dial	134,935	43.29
Total votes		311,674	100

=== General election ===
2018 Alabama Commissioner of Agriculture and Industries election
Party	Candidate	Votes	%
Republican	Rick Pate	1,081,431	97.19
Write-in		31,312	2.81
Total votes		1,112,743	100
Republican hold			

== State Supreme Court ==
Five seats on the Supreme Court of Alabama were up for election, of which three were contested.

=== Chief Justice ===
2018 Alabama Supreme Court Chief Justice election
- November 6, 2018

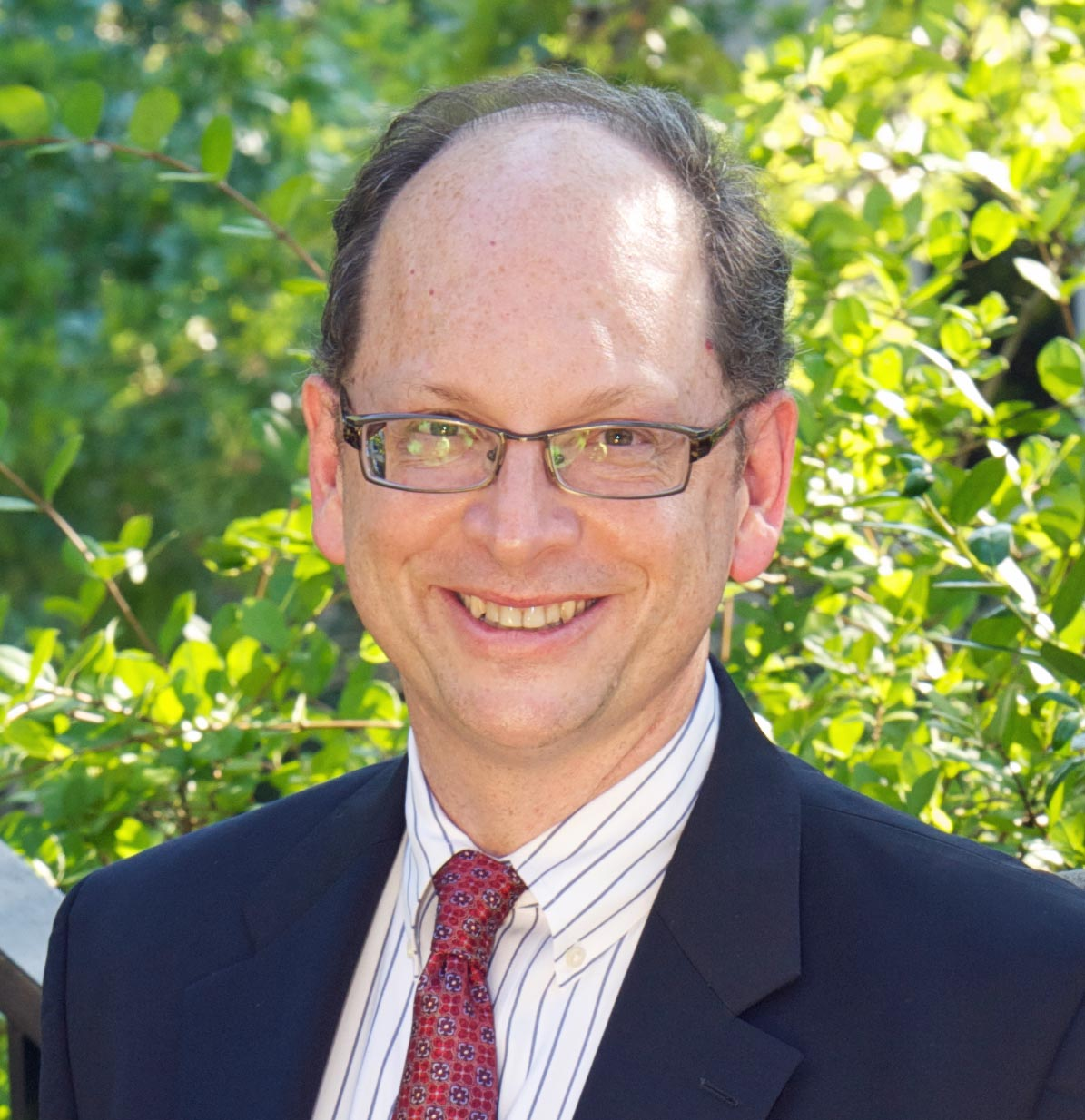
Nominee	Tom Parker	Bob Vance
Party	Republican	Democratic
Popular vote	975,564	723,149
Percentage	57.39%	42.55%
- County results Parker: 40–50% 50–60% 60–70% 70–80% 80–90% Vance: 50–60% 60–70% 70–80% 80–90%
Chief Justice before election
Lyn Stuart
Republican
Elected Chief Justice
Tom Parker
Republican

Incumbent Republican Chief Justice Lyn Stuart was appointed by Governor Kay Ivey in 2017 to serve the remaining term of Roy Moore who was suspended. Stuart ran for a full term and was challenged by Republican Associate Justice Tom Parker and Democratic Jefferson County circuit court judge Bob Vance.

==== Republican primary ====
===== Candidates =====
- Lyn Stuart, incumbent Chief Justice.
- Tom Parker, Associate Justice.

===== Primary results =====
Primary results by county Parker: 50–60%; 60–70%; 70–80%; Stuart: 50–60%; 60–70%; 70–80%

Republican primary results
Party	Candidate	Votes	%
Republican	Tom Parker	267,559	51.84
Republican	Lyn Stuart (incumbent)	248,605	48.16
Total votes		516,164	100

==== Democratic nominee ====
- Bob Vance, Jefferson County circuit court judge and Democratic nominee in 2012.

==== General election ====
2018 Alabama Supreme Court Chief Justice election
Party	Candidate	Votes	%
Republican	Tom Parker	975,564	57.39
Democratic	Bob Vance	723,149	42.55
Write-in		1,073	0.06
Total votes		1,699,786	100
Republican hold			

=== Associate Justice, Place 1 ===
Incumbent Republican Justice Brad Mendheim was appointed by Governor Kay Ivey in January 2018 to replace Glenn Murdock who resigned. Mendheim ran for a full term but was defeated in the primaries by Mobile County circuit court judge Sarah Hicks Stewart.

==== Republican primary ====
===== Candidates =====
- Brad Mendheim, incumbent Associate Justice.
- Sarah Hicks Stewart, circuit judge.
- Debra H. Jones, circuit judge.

===== Primary first round =====
Republican primary results
Party	Candidate	Votes	%
Republican	Brad Mendheim (incumbent)	203,369	43.40
Republican	Sarah Hicks Stewart	137,321	29.31
Republican	Debra H. Jones	127,861	27.29
Total votes		468,551	100

===== Primary runoff =====
Republican primary runoff results
Party	Candidate	Votes	%
Republican	Sarah Hicks Stewart	180,226	56.67
Republican	Brad Mendheim (incumbent)	137,816	43.33
Total votes		318,042	100

==== General election ====
2018 Alabama Supreme Court Associate Justice Place 1 election
Party	Candidate	Votes	%
Republican	Sarah Hicks Stewart	1,098,344	96.80
Write-in		36,256	3.20
Total votes		1,134,600	100
Republican hold			

=== Associate Justice, Place 4 ===
Incumbent Republican Justice James Allen Main was ineligible for re-election due to age limits imposed by the state constitution.

==== Republican primary ====
===== Candidates =====
- Jay Mitchell, attorney.
- John Bahakel, attorney.

===== Primary results =====
Republican primary results
Party	Candidate	Votes	%
Republican	Jay Mitchell	306,025	71.05
Republican	John Bahakel	124,668	28.95
Total votes		430,693	100

==== Democratic nominee ====
- Donna Smalley, lawyer.

==== General election ====
Results by county Mitchell: 50–60%; 60–70%; 70–80%; 80–90%; Smalley: 50–60%; 60–70%; 70–80%; 80–90%

2018 Alabama Supreme Court Associate Justice Place 4 election
Party	Candidate	Votes	%
Republican	Jay Mitchell	1,014,761	60.51
Democratic	Donna Smalley	661,034	39.41
Write-in		1,302	0.08
Total votes		1,677,097	100
Republican hold			

== State Appellate Courts ==
Three seats each on the Alabama Court of Civil Appeals and Alabama Court of Criminal Appeals were up for election, of which five were contested.

=== Court of Civil Appeals, Place 1 ===
Incumbent Republican judge Craig Sorrell Pittman did not file for re-election.

==== Republican primary ====
- Christy Olinger Edwards, judge.
- Peyton Thetford, former judge.
- Michelle Thomason, judge.

===== Primary first round =====
Republican primary results
Party	Candidate	Votes	%
Republican	Christy Olinger Edwards	167,238	40.75
Republican	Michelle Thomason	131,298	31.99
Republican	Peyton Thetford	111,853	27.26
Total votes		410,389	100

===== Primary runoff =====
Republican primary runoff results
Party	Candidate	Votes	%
Republican	Christy Olinger Edwards	149,091	53.64
Republican	Michelle Thomason	128,855	46.36
Total votes		277,946	100

==== General election ====
2018 Alabama Court of Civil Appeals Place 1 election
Party	Candidate	Votes	%
Republican	Christy Olinger Edwards	1,084,931	97.00
Write-in		33,510	3.00
Total votes		1,118,441	100
Republican hold			

=== Court of Civil Appeals, Place 2 ===
Incumbent Republican judge Terri Willingham Thomas ran for re-election but lost in the primary to Chad Hanson.

==== Republican primary ====
===== Candidates =====
- Terri Willingham Thomas, incumbent judge.
- Chad Hanson, attorney.

===== Primary results =====
Republican primary results
Party	Candidate	Votes	%
Republican	Chad Hanson	214,613	53.18
Republican	Terri Willingham Thomas (incumbent)	188,982	46.82
Total votes		403,595	100

==== General election ====
2018 Alabama Court of Civil Appeals Place 2 election
Party	Candidate	Votes	%
Republican	Chad Hanson	1,081,480	97.01
Write-in		33,277	2.99
Total votes		1,114,757	100
Republican hold			

=== Court of Criminal Appeals, Place 1 ===
Incumbent Republican judge Samuel H. Welch did not file for re-election.

==== Republican primary ====
===== Candidates =====
- Richard Minor, attorney.
- Riggs Walker, prosecutor.

===== Primary results =====
Republican primary results
Party	Candidate	Votes	%
Republican	Richard Minor	258,805	65.52
Republican	Riggs Walker	136,174	34.48
Total votes		394,979	100

==== General election ====
2018 Alabama Court of Criminal Appeals Place 1 election
Party	Candidate	Votes	%
Republican	Richard Minor	1,080,637	97.04
Write-in		32,927	2.96
Total votes		1,113,564	100
Republican hold			

=== Court of Criminal Appeals, Place 2 ===
Incumbent Republican judge Liles C. Burke resigned to serve as a district judge of the United States District Court for the Northern District of Alabama.

==== Republican primary ====
===== Candidates =====
- Chris McCool, district attorney.
- Rich Anderson, prosecutor.
- Dennis O'Dell, judge.

===== Primary first round =====
Republican primary results
Party	Candidate	Votes	%
Republican	Chris McCool	172,773	42.56
Republican	Rich Anderson	141,166	34.77
Republican	Dennis O'Dell	92,019	22.67
Total votes		405,958	100

===== Primary runoff =====
Republican primary runoff results
Party	Candidate	Votes	%
Republican	Chris McCool	153,962	55.56
Republican	Rich Anderson	123,166	44.44
Total votes		277,128	100

==== General election ====
2018 Alabama Court of Criminal Appeals Place 2 election
Party	Candidate	Votes	%
Republican	Chris McCool	1,079,559	97.08
Write-in		32,504	2.92
Total votes		1,112,063	100
Republican hold			

=== Court of Criminal Appeals, Place 3 ===
Incumbent Republican judge Michael Joiner did not file for re-election.

==== Republican primary ====
===== Candidates =====
- Donna Beaulieu, attorney.
- William "Bill" Cole, circuit court judge.

===== Primary results =====
Republican primary results
Party	Candidate	Votes	%
Republican	William "Bill" Cole	242,487	60.18
Republican	Donna Beaulieu	160,479	39.82
Total votes		402,966	100

==== General election ====
2018 Alabama Court of Criminal Appeals Place 3 election
Party	Candidate	Votes	%
Republican	William "Bill" Cole	1,077,733	97.11
Write-in		32,076	2.89
Total votes		1,109,809	100
Republican hold			

== Public Service Commission ==
The two associate commissioner seats on the Alabama Public Service Commission were up for election. Incumbent Republican commissioners Jeremy Oden, who was appointed to the commission by Governor Bentley in December 2012, and Chris "Chip" Beeker, who was first elected in 2014, were both eligible to run for re-election.

=== Place 1 ===
==== Democratic nominee ====
- Cara McClure, entrepreneur.

==== Republican primary ====
===== Candidates =====
- Jim Bonner, former community college teacher.
- Jeremy Oden, incumbent.

===== Controversy =====
In the weeks leading up to the primary, the state GOP unanimously decided to censure Jim Bonner as various offensive comments he made on social media were uncovered. Terry Lathan, Chairman of Alabama GOP, announced the following day the party had voted not to certify ballots cast for him in the upcoming primary. Jo Bonner, former U.S. Representative from the first congressional district, publicly denied any relation to him and expressed resentment over his views.

Incumbent Oden narrowly defeated Bonner in the primary election; the margin of victory was wide enough to avoid an automatic recount. Bonner tried to raise funds for a recount but was unsuccessful. The state GOP also upheld their decision to keep his votes uncertified.

===== Primary results =====
Primary results by county Oden: 50–60%; 60–70%; 70–80%; Bonner: 50–60%; 60–70%; 70–80%

Republican primary results
Party	Candidate	Votes	%
Republican	Jeremy Oden (incumbent)	222,830	50.58
Republican	~~Jim Bonner~~	~~217,721~~	~~49.42~~
Total votes		440,551	100

==== General election ====
Results by county Oden: 50–60%; 60–70%; 70–80%; 80–90%; McClure: 50–60%; 60–70%; 70–80%; 80–90%

2018 Alabama Public Service Commissioner election
Party	Candidate	Votes	%
Republican	Jeremy Oden (incumbent)	1,013,072	60.42
Democratic	Cara McClure	662,581	39.52
Write-in		940	0.06
Total votes		1,676,593	100
Republican hold			

=== Place 2 ===
==== Democratic nominee ====
- Kari Powell, small business owner.

==== Republican primary ====
===== Candidates =====
- Chip Beeker, incumbent.
- Robin Litaker, retired elementary school principal.

===== Results =====
Republican primary results
Party	Candidate	Votes	%
Republican	Chip Beeker (incumbent)	281,753	68.66
Republican	Robin Litaker	128,587	31.34
Total votes		410,340	100

==== General election ====
Results by county Beeker: 40–50%; 50–60%; 60–70%; 70–80%; 80–90%; Powell: 50–60%; 60–70%; 70–80%; 80–90%

2018 Alabama Public Service Commissioner election
Party	Candidate	Votes	%
Republican	Chip Beeker (incumbent)	1,006,713	60.05
Democratic	Kari Powell	668,620	39.89
Write-in		1,029	0.06
Total votes		1,676,362	100
Republican hold			

== Alabama State Legislature ==
Every member of the Alabama state legislature was up for election in 2018. Both state senators and state representatives serve four-year terms in Alabama. After the 2014 elections, Republicans maintained control of both chambers. In 2018, all 35 Alabama Senate seats and all 105 Alabama House of Representatives seats were up for election. These seats would not be contested in a regularly scheduled election again until 2022.

The outcome of this election could affect partisan balance during post-2020 census redistricting.

=== Senate ===
Republicans won 27 seats, while Democrats won eight. The Republican Party gained one seat, the 29th, which was held by an retiring independent who caucused with the Republicans.

=== House of Representatives ===
Republicans won 77 seats, while Democrats won 28. The Republican Party gained five seats.

== United States House of Representatives ==
All of Alabama's seven seats in the United States House of Representatives were up for election in 2018. Six Republicans and one Democrat were re-elected. No districts changed partisan control.

== Ballot measures ==
Four statewide measures were on the ballot in Alabama, all of which were approved by the voters.

=== Amendment 1 ===
The Ten Commandments Amendment would allow display of the Ten Commandments on state property.

Amendment 1 results by county Yes: 90–100%; 80–90%; 70–80%; 60–70%; 50–60%; No: 50–60%

Amendment 1
Choice	Votes	%
For	1,094,677	71.65
Against	433,133	28.35
Total	1,527,810	100.00

=== Amendment 2 ===
The State Abortion Policy Amendment would amend the Constitution of Alabama to "support the sanctity of unborn life" and reject the notion that abortion is a right.

=== Amendment 3 ===
The Board of Trustees Membership for University of Alabama Amendment would make certain changes to the membership of the board of trustees of the University of Alabama.

Amendment 3 results by county Yes: 70–80%; 60–70%; 50–60%; No: 50–60%

Amendment 3
Choice	Votes	%
For	835,707	60.30
Against	550,299	39.70
Total	1,386,006	100.00

=== Amendment 4 ===
The Legislative Vacancies Amendment would change the legislative vacancy procedure to allow seats to remain vacant if the remaining term is no more than a certain length.

Amendment 4 results by county Yes: 70–80%; 60–70%; 50–60%; No: 50–60%

Amendment 4
Choice	Votes	%
For	973,951	66.13
Against	498,918	33.87
Total	1,472,869	100.00
