= 2024 Alabama Supreme Court election =

- November 5, 2024

The 2024 Alabama Supreme Court election took place on November 5, 2024, to elect five of the nine members to the Supreme Court of Alabama, including the Chief Justice. The justices will serve six-year terms.

== Chief Justice ==
2024 Alabama Supreme Court chief justice election
Candidate	Sarah Stewart	Greg Griffin
Party	Republican	Democratic
Popular vote	1,458,501	756,675
Percentage	65.77%	34.12%
- County results Stewart: 50–60% 60–70% 70–80% 80–90% >90% Griffin: 50–60% 60–70% 70–80%
Chief Justice before election
Tom Parker
Republican
Elected Chief Justice
Sarah Stewart
Republican

Incumbent Chief Justice Tom Parker decided to retire.

=== Republican primary ===
==== Candidates ====
===== Nominee =====
- Sarah Stewart, Alabama Supreme Court associate justice.

===== Eliminated in primary =====
- Bryan Taylor, former state senator from the 30th district.

==== Primary results ====
Republican primary results
Party	Candidate	Votes	%
Republican	Sarah Stewart	334,135	61.50
Republican	Bryan Taylor	209,217	38.50
Total votes		543,352	100

=== Democratic primary ===
Only one candidate filed for the Democratic nomination, so no primary was held.

==== Candidates ====
- Greg Griffin, Alabama Circuit Court judge from the 15th judicial circuit.

=== General election ===
==== Results ====
2024 Alabama Chief Justice of the Supreme Court election
Party	Candidate	Votes	%
Republican	Sarah Stewart	1,458,501	65.77
Democratic	Greg Griffin	756,675	34.12
Write-in		2,350	0.11
Total votes		2,217,526	100.00
Republican hold			

==== By county ====
County	Sarah Stewart Republican		Greg Griffin Democratic		Write-in Various		Margin		Total
County	#	%	#	%	#	%	#	%	Total
Autauga	20,452	73.56%	7,323	26.34%	28	0.10%	13,129	47.22%	27,803
Baldwin	97,092	80.54%	23,387	19.40%	70	0.06%	73,705	61.14%	120,549
Barbour	5,468	57.10%	4,098	42.79%	10	0.10%	1,370	14.31%	9,576
Bibb	7,453	81.70%	1,662	18.22%	7	0.08%	5,791	63.48%	9,122
Blount	24,672	89.69%	2,805	10.20%	32	0.12%	21,867	79.49%	27,509
Bullock	1,118	27.93%	2,885	72.07%	0	0.00%	-1,767	-44.14%	4,003
Butler	5,000	60.04%	3,323	39.90%	5	0.06%	1,677	20.14%	8,328
Calhoun	34,443	72.56%	12,956	27.29%	68	0.14%	21,487	45.27%	47,467
Chambers	8,564	61.87%	5,266	38.04%	13	0.09%	3,298	23.82%	13,843
Cherokee	11,076	87.32%	1,600	12.61%	8	0.06%	9,476	74.71%	12,684
Chilton	16,326	85.39%	2,775	14.51%	19	0.10%	13,551	70.87%	19,120
Choctaw	3,977	61.98%	2,438	37.99%	2	0.03%	1,539	23.98%	6,417
Clarke	6,836	58.47%	4,849	41.47%	7	0.06%	1,987	16.99%	11,692
Clay	5,530	84.23%	1,029	15.67%	6	0.09%	4,501	68.56%	6,565
Cleburne	6,729	90.99%	663	8.97%	3	0.04%	6,066	82.03%	7,395
Coffee	17,351	79.21%	4,538	20.72%	15	0.07%	12,813	58.50%	21,904
Colbert	19,108	72.55%	7,209	27.37%	21	0.08%	11,899	45.18%	26,338
Conecuh	3,149	55.03%	2,564	44.81%	9	0.16%	585	10.22%	5,722
Coosa	3,704	71.62%	1,467	28.36%	1	0.02%	2,237	43.25%	5,172
Covington	14,258	85.54%	2,405	14.43%	6	0.04%	11,853	71.11%	16,669
Crenshaw	4,862	76.63%	1,480	23.33%	3	0.05%	3,382	53.30%	6,345
Cullman	37,791	89.34%	4,474	10.58%	37	0.09%	33,317	78.76%	42,302
Dale	14,379	76.41%	4,419	23.48%	20	0.11%	9,960	52.93%	18,818
Dallas	5,082	33.45%	10,098	66.47%	12	0.08%	-5,016	-33.02%	15,192
DeKalb	24,799	86.19%	3,955	13.75%	18	0.06%	20,844	72.45%	28,772
Elmore	31,442	76.67%	9,530	23.24%	38	0.09%	21,912	53.43%	41,010
Escambia	10,706	73.18%	3,910	26.73%	13	0.09%	6,796	46.46%	14,629
Etowah	34,973	77.53%	10,082	22.35%	53	0.12%	24,891	55.18%	45,108
Fayette	6,929	85.42%	1,171	14.44%	12	0.15%	5,758	70.98%	8,112
Franklin	9,786	84.83%	1,736	15.05%	14	0.12%	8,050	69.78%	11,536
Geneva	10,724	88.17%	1,435	11.80%	4	0.03%	9,289	76.37%	12,163
Greene	835	21.20%	3,100	78.72%	3	0.08%	-2,265	-57.52%	3,938
Hale	3,291	47.34%	3,653	52.55%	8	0.12%	-362	-5.21%	6,952
Henry	6,822	75.00%	2,268	24.93%	6	0.07%	4,554	50.07%	9,096
Houston	32,416	74.36%	11,131	25.53%	47	0.11%	21,285	48.83%	43,594
Jackson	19,036	84.53%	3,463	15.38%	22	0.10%	15,573	69.15%	22,521
Jefferson	136,164	46.20%	158,299	53.71%	239	0.08%	-22,135	-7.51%	294,702
Lamar	5,780	86.63%	886	13.28%	6	0.09%	4,894	73.35%	6,672
Lauderdale	31,925	75.45%	10,357	24.48%	32	0.08%	21,568	50.97%	42,314
Lawrence	12,411	79.83%	3,119	20.06%	16	0.10%	9,292	59.77%	15,546
Lee	46,721	65.20%	24,823	34.64%	119	0.17%	21,898	30.56%	71,663
Limestone	37,463	72.32%	14,268	27.54%	73	0.14%	23,195	44.77%	51,804
Lowndes	1,714	31.85%	3,664	68.08%	4	0.07%	-1,950	-36.23%	5,382
Macon	1,690	21.88%	6,026	78.03%	7	0.09%	-4,336	-56.14%	7,723
Madison	107,999	56.31%	83,383	43.48%	399	0.21%	24,616	12.84%	191,781
Marengo	4,783	50.99%	4,587	48.90%	10	0.11%	196	2.09%	9,380
Marion	11,781	89.43%	1,389	10.54%	4	0.03%	10,392	78.88%	13,174
Marshall	33,584	85.64%	5,590	14.25%	41	0.10%	27,994	71.39%	39,215
Mobile	101,999	59.22%	70,048	40.67%	181	0.11%	31,951	18.55%	172,228
Monroe	5,892	61.22%	3,727	38.72%	6	0.06%	2,165	22.49%	9,625
Montgomery	31,046	35.05%	57,425	64.83%	112	0.13%	-26,379	-29.78%	88,583
Morgan	39,897	76.52%	12,183	23.37%	60	0.12%	27,714	53.15%	52,140
Perry	1,206	27.87%	3,120	72.09%	2	0.05%	-1,914	-44.22%	4,328
Pickens	5,360	61.22%	3,396	38.78%	0	0.00%	1,964	22.43%	8,756
Pike	8,138	62.79%	4,814	37.15%	8	0.06%	3,324	25.65%	12,960
Randolph	8,780	82.00%	1,912	17.86%	15	0.14%	6,868	64.14%	10,707
Russell	10,025	49.18%	10,344	50.74%	16	0.08%	-319	-1.56%	20,385
Shelby	81,233	71.71%	31,935	28.19%	109	0.10%	49,298	43.52%	113,277
St. Clair	35,155	82.14%	7,605	17.77%	40	0.09%	27,550	64.37%	42,800
Sumter	1,504	29.09%	3,659	70.77%	7	0.14%	-2,155	-41.68%	5,170
Talladega	21,854	66.69%	10,866	33.16%	50	0.15%	10,988	33.53%	32,770
Tallapoosa	14,633	74.64%	4,951	25.26%	20	0.10%	9,682	49.39%	19,604
Tuscaloosa	51,060	60.93%	32,655	38.97%	89	0.11%	18,405	21.96%	83,804
Walker	24,623	84.59%	4,451	15.29%	34	0.12%	20,172	69.30%	29,108
Washington	6,284	76.51%	1,925	23.44%	4	0.05%	4,359	53.07%	8,213
Wilcox	1,761	35.92%	3,137	63.99%	4	0.08%	-1,376	-28.07%	4,902
Winston	9,857	90.90%	984	9.07%	3	0.03%	8,873	81.82%	10,844
Totals	1,458,501	64.77%	756,675	34.12%	2,350	0.11%	701,826	31.65%	2,217,526

== Place 1 ==
2024 Alabama Supreme Court election, Place 1
Candidate	Chris McCool
Party	Republican
Popular vote	1,564,832
Percentage	97.62%
Justice before election
Sarah Stewart
Republican
Elected Justice
Chris McCool
Republican

Incumbent Justice Sarah Stewart decided not to seek re-election and successfully ran for Chief Justice.

Only one major party candidate filed, so no primary elections were held.

=== Republican primary ===
==== Candidates ====
- Chris McCool, associate justice of the Alabama Court of Criminal Appeals.

=== General election ===
==== Results ====
2024 Alabama Associate Justice of the Supreme Court, Place 1 election
Party	Candidate	Votes	%
Republican	Chris McCool	1,564,832	97.62
Write-in		38,088	2.38
Total votes		1,602,920	100
Republican hold			

== Place 2 ==
2024 Alabama Supreme Court election, Place 2
Candidate	Tommy Bryan
Party	Republican
Popular vote	1,560,072
Percentage	97.69%
Justice before election
Tommy Bryan
Republican
Elected Justice
Tommy Bryan
Republican

Incumbent Justice Tommy Bryan ran for a third term.

=== Republican primary ===
==== Candidates ====
- Tommy Bryan, incumbent.

=== General election ===
==== Results ====
2024 Alabama Associate Justice of the Supreme Court, Place 2 election
Party	Candidate	Votes	%
Republican	Tommy Bryan (incumbent)	1,560,072	97.69
Write-in		36,838	2.31
Total votes		1,596,910	100

== Place 3 ==
2024 Alabama Supreme Court election, Place 3
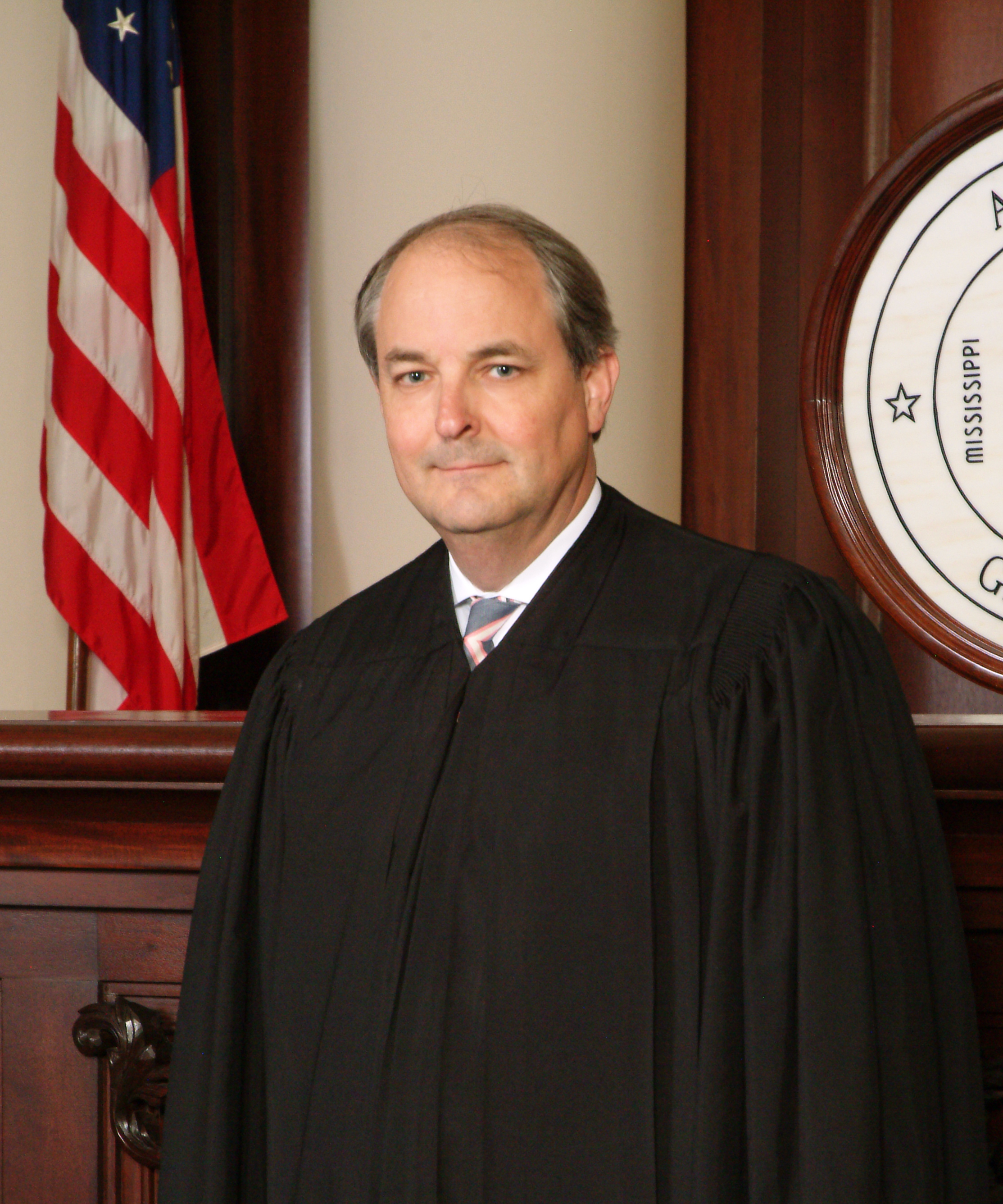
Candidate	Will Sellers
Party	Republican
Popular vote	1,557,606
Percentage	97.77%
Justice before election
Will Sellers
Republican
Elected Justice
Will Sellers
Republican

Incumbent Justice Will Sellers ran for a second full term.

=== Republican primary ===
==== Candidates ====
- Will Sellers, incumbent.

=== General election ===
==== Endorsements ====
Will Sellers (R)

Organizations

- Alabama Forestry Association

==== Results ====
2024 Alabama Associate Justice of the Supreme Court, Place 3 election
Party	Candidate	Votes	%
Republican	Will Sellers (incumbent)	1,557,606	97.77
Write-in		35,479	2.23
Total votes		1,593,085	100

== Place 4 ==
2024 Alabama Supreme Court election, Place 4
Candidate	Jay Mitchell
Party	Republican
Popular vote	1,555,235
Percentage	97.80%
Justice before election
Jay Mitchell
Republican
Elected Justice
Jay Mitchell
Republican

Incumbent Justice Jay Mitchell ran for a second term.

=== Republican primary ===
==== Candidates ====
- Jay Mitchell, incumbent.

=== General election ===
==== Results ====
2024 Alabama Associate Justice of the Supreme Court, Place 4 election
Party	Candidate	Votes	%
Republican	Jay Mitchell (incumbent)	1,555,235	97.80
Write-in		35,034	2.20
Total votes		1,590,269	100
