= LePage v. Center for Reproductive Medicine =

2024 Alabama Supreme Court case concerning in vitro fertilization

- Court: Supreme Court of Alabama
- Full case name: James LePage, Emily LePage, William Tripp Fonde, and Caroline Fonde v. The Center for Reproductive Medicine, P.C. and Mobile Infirmary Association d/b/a Mobile Infirmary Medical Center
- Verdict: 8-1
- Citation: SC-2022-0515

Court membership
- Judges sitting: Tom Parker, Greg Shaw, Alisa Kelli Wise, Tommy Bryan, Will Sellers, Sarah Hicks Stewart, Brady E. Mendheim Jr., Jay Mitchell, Greg Cook

Case opinions
- Decision by: Mitchell, joined by Wise and Bryan
- Concurrence: Parker; Shaw, joined by Stewart; Mendheim (in judgment)
- Concur/dissent: Sellers (concurring in judgment in part and dissenting in part)
- Dissent: Cook

Laws applied
- Alabama Code § 6-5-391

James LePage, et al. v. The Center for Reproductive Medicine and Mobile Infirmary Association (Note: Decided with Felicia Burdick-Aysenne and Scott Aysenne v. The Center for Reproductive Medicine and Mobile Infirmary Association.) is a 2024 Alabama Supreme Court case in which the court reaffirmed that frozen embryos are considered a minor child for statutory purposes, allowing for in vitro fertilization (IVF) clinics to be held liable for the accidental loss of embryos under Alabama's Wrongful Death of a Minor statute, enacted by the Alabama legislature in 1872. In response, several IVF clinics in Alabama suspended operations.

The Alabama Supreme Court's ruling received bipartisan criticism, particularly in the wake of the U.S. Supreme Court's decision in Dobbs v. Jackson Women's Health Organization (2022). The lawsuit originated after a patient improperly accessed a cryogenic freezer in 2020 and dropped several embryos. Lower courts had previously dismissed the parents' claims, ruling that the embryos did not fit the statutory definition of a person or child.

== Background ==
In vitro fertilization (IVF) is a medical process used to help individuals or couples conceive a child when natural conception is difficult or not possible. It involves combining a woman’s eggs and a man’s sperm in a laboratory to create embryos outside the body. After the embryos develop to a certain stage, typically a few days, one or more are implanted into the woman’s uterus with the hope of achieving pregnancy. The remaining embryos may be frozen for future use, allowing for additional attempts at pregnancy without repeating the entire process.

Between 2013 and 2016, plaintiffs—three married couples—underwent IVF treatment at a clinic operated by the Center for Reproductive Medicine. There, the couples were able to produce several embryos in vitro. Some of those embryos were successfully implanted, and the others were kept in the Center's cryogenic nursery for future implantation. In 2020, a patient at the Center for Reproductive Medicine in Mobile, Alabama improperly accessed the cryogenic freezer where frozen embryos were stored, removing and dropping them on the floor after their hands suffered from cold burns.

=== Lower court rulings ===
Four parents—James and Emily LePage and Felicia and Scott Aysenne—sued against the Center for Reproductive Medicine, with William Tripp and Caroline Fonde serving as plaintiffs in LePage's lawsuit. Both suits asserted claims under Alabama's Wrongful Death of a Minor Statute. The Center for Reproductive Medicine moved to dismiss the claims. The trial court granted those motions, explaining its view that "[t]he cryopreserved, in vitro embryos involved in this case did not fit within the statutory definition of 'person'" or "'child,'" and held that their loss did not accrue a cause of action for wrongful death. The Mobile Circuit Court affirmed the judgment on appeal.

== Alabama Supreme Court ==
Consistent with a prior decision from 2011, on February 20, 2024, the Alabama Supreme Court reversed the decision of the Mobile Circuit Court, and remanded the case to the trial court for hearing on the liability of the defendants.

The Alabama Supreme Court explained in its opinion, with Associate Justice Jay Mitchell writing for the majority, that if a frozen embryo is destroyed, those responsible could be sued under the Alabama Wrongful Death of a Minor Statute. Mitchell's opinion also cited a 2018 amendment to the state constitution, arguing that its approval by Alabama voters evidenced "the public policy of [Alabama] to recognize and support the sanctity of unborn life and the rights of unborn children."

Chief Justice Tom Parker, elected to his post in 2018, wrote a concurring opinion to the ruling, citing the Bible's Book of Jeremiah and Book of Genesis; the Sixth Commandment; the Manhattan Declaration; as well as Christian theologians such as Thomas Aquinas and John Calvin. Parker stated:

In summary, the theologically based view of the sanctity of life adopted by the People of Alabama encompasses the following: (1) God made every person in His image; (2) each person therefore has a value that far exceeds the ability of human beings to calculate; and (3) human life cannot be wrongfully destroyed without incurring the wrath of a holy God, who views the destruction of His image as an affront to Himself.

Alabama's Human Life Protection Act, enacted by the Alabama legislature in 2021, which states that it is a felony to perform any type of abortion, was cited by Justice Brady Mendheim when concurring in the court's judgment.

== Impact ==
=== In vitro fertilization access ===
Following the Alabama Supreme Court's ruling, the University of Alabama at Birmingham announced that it was pausing in vitro fertilization treatments. Two other IVF clinics also paused treatments following the ruling. Alabama Attorney General Steve Marshall that he "has no intention of using the recent Alabama Supreme Court decision as a basis for prosecuting IVF families or providers." The next day, an explosive device was detonated outside of Marshall's office in Montgomery, although no one was harmed in the incident.

State lawmakers from both political parties reacted the same week to protect IVF. A bill with bipartisan support and backing from Alabama's governor Kay Ivey was introduced that "would provide that any fertilized human egg or human embryo that exists outside of a human uterus is not considered an unborn child or human being for any purpose under state law" and allow IVF clinics to proceed as normal. On February 29, 2024, the two houses of the Alabama legislature passed similar bills, stating "no action, suit, or criminal prosecution for the damage to or death of an embryo shall be brought or maintained against any individual or entity when providing or receiving goods or services related to in vitro fertilization." Ivey signed the law on March 6, 2024, with two of the IVF clinics stating they would immediately resume services.

At the federal level, a bill titled the Access to Family Building Act was introduced in the United States Congress in January 2024, which would both create a statutory right to IVF and override all conflicting federal, state, or local regulations, whether adopted before, on, or after its enactment, including the Religious Freedom Restoration Act of 1993. The bill's co-sponsor Senator Tammy Duckworth urged action on the bill in light of the Alabama court ruling. However, Senate Republicans blocked the bill during voting on February 28, 2024.

According to David Schultz, professor of law at University of Minnesota, this ruling cannot be appealed to the U.S. Supreme Court, as the decision is solely an interpretation of Alabama state law. Schultz also argues that this ruling would have been possible prior to the overturning of federal abortion protection in the 2022 Dobbs decision, because it does not directly relate to abortion.

=== 2024 U.S. presidential election ===
The Alabama case was seen to have a potentially significant impact on the 2024 United States presidential election, following the U.S. Supreme Court decision to overturn Roe v. Wade in the 2022 case Dobbs v. Jackson Women's Health Organization. The Democratic party started to immediately add the issue of protecting IVF treatments to its campaign platform in addition to its fight to protect abortion and reproductive services. President Joe Biden condemned the ruling, stating it was only possible due to the decision from Dobbs and that "the disregard for women's ability to make these decisions for themselves and their families is outrageous and unacceptable." Vice President Kamala Harris said, "On the one hand, the proponents are saying that an individual doesn't have a right to end an unwanted pregnancy and, on the other hand, the individual does not have the right to start a family."

Some members of the Republican party, already trying to push their stance on abortion to the background so as to draw votes from women and swing voters, were critical of the Alabama Supreme Court decision since it left no carve out to protect IVF. Former president Donald Trump, running in 2024 for a second term as president, stated that access to IVF and fertility treatments should remain legal. Nikki Haley, another Republican candidate, initially stated that "embryos are babies," but later said she would need to review the law, stating, "We don't want fertility treatments to shut down." New Hampshire Governor Chris Sununu and Tennessee Governor Bill Lee also spoke out against the decision. Other Republican leaders in the U.S. House of Representatives praised the decision, having previously backed a bill that would codify that life begins at conception.

=== Parker's concurrence and Christian nationalism ===
Chief Justice Tom Parker's concurring opinion rested heavily on Christian principles, leading to concern about his overall approach to judiciary duties. The same day of the decision, an interview with Parker was released where he expressed his beliefs in Christian nationalism and support of the Seven Mountain Mandate. Parker said in this interview, "God created government, and the fact that we have let it go into the possession of others, it's heartbreaking. That's why he is calling and equipping people to step back into these mountains right now."

Parker's comments, in addition to his judicial opinion, have led to concern about the push of Christian nationalism by conservative politicians and the Republican party, and the attempted weakening of the separation of church and state.

== See also ==
- Comstock Act of 1873
