= Alabama Republican Party =

Alabama affiliate of the Republican Party

- Chairperson: Scott Stadthagen
- Governor: Kay Ivey
- Senate leader: Garlan Gudger
- House speaker: Nathaniel Ledbetter
- Chief Justice: Sarah Hicks Stewart
- Founded: 1867
- Headquarters: 3505 Lorna Road; Birmingham
- Ideology: Conservatism
- National affiliation: Republican Party
- Colors: Red
- Senate: 27 / 35
- House of Representatives: 75 / 105
- State Board of Education: 7 / 9
- Statewide Executive Offices: 7 / 7
- Supreme Court of Alabama: 9 / 9
- U.S. Senate: 2 / 2
- U.S. House of Representatives: 5 / 7

Election symbol

Website
- algop.org

The Alabama Republican Party is the state affiliate of the Republican Party in Alabama. It has been the dominant political party in Alabama since the late 20th century. The state party is governed by the Alabama Republican Executive Committee. The committee usually meets twice a year. As of the February 23, 2019 meeting in Birmingham, the committee is composed of 463 members. Most of the committee's members are elected in district elections across Alabama. The district members are elected in the Republican Primary once every four years, with the most recent election for the committee having been on June 5, 2018. The new committee takes office following the general election in November 2018. In addition, all 67 county GOP chairmen have automatic seats as voting members. The state chairman can appoint 10 members. Each county committee can appoint bonus members (maximum of five per county) based on a formula that theoretically could add 312 seats, although that formula currently calls for only about 50 seats.

The Alabama Republican Executive Committee has several important functions. Every two years the committee elects the state chairman, vice chairmen, the secretary and the treasurer as well as other members of a steering committee. Together, they have responsibility for administering the day-to-day operations of the party. The committee also sets election rules for the statewide Republican primary and has oversight responsibilities for the 67 county parties. The committee also elects The national committeeman (currently Paul Reynolds, since 2008) and national committeewoman (currently Vicki A. Drummond, since 2012) to serve on the Republican National Committee from Alabama. In addition, Vicki Drummond serves as the secretary of the Republican National Committee. Once every four years the committee selects the GOP slate for U.S. presidential electors and chooses alternate delegates to the GOP National Convention.

== History ==
The Republicans held their first statewide convention on June 4, 1867; John Keffer, a Freedmen's Bureau agent, was made the first party's first chair. The party's entire state and congressional slate in the 1868 election was white.

=== The founding of the Alabama GOP (1854–1867) ===
When the Republican Party was first organized in 1854 as an anti-slavery party, it did not compete in southern states such as Alabama. In its first three presidential elections (including 1864, in which Alabama did not participate due to the Civil War), the party did not even distribute ballots in Alabama for its presidential candidate. (At the time, ballots were not printed by the government, but were distributed by parties for their supporters to drop into ballot boxes). After the Civil War and following Alabama's readmission to the union in 1868, Alabama was a Republican-dominated state for much of the Reconstruction period due to a combination of factors including its support from north Alabama unionists, poor white farmers who had never owned slaves, and the newly enfranchised black voters. Republican Ulysses S. Grant carried the state in both the 1868 and 1872 presidential elections.

One of the organizations that became the initial Alabama GOP, the Union League, first came into north Alabama in 1863 as counties fell back under Union control during The Civil War. In early 1867, local Republicans gathered in several different meetings around the state. The first was in Moulton, on January 8 and 9 in Lawrence County, then March meetings in both Huntsville and Decatur, a gathering on March 25 in Montgomery, and then May 1 in Mobile, all for the purpose of organizing an early summer state convention to create a state Republican Party. In a simultaneous meeting with the Union League, the Republican Party of Alabama was initially organized on June 4–5, 1867. That first state convention was held in the capital city of Montgomery in the chambers of the Alabama House of Representatives. That convention was called the Union Republican Convention and consisted of 150 delegates, of whom 100 were black. Alabama Governor Robert M. Patton spoke to the convention. Francis W. Sykes of Lawrence County was elected as chairman pro tempore, and Judge William Hugh Smith of Randolph County was named permanent chairman of the convention. The convention's delegates were mostly from two groups, the Freedmen's Bureau (which included and/or represented most of Alabama's black citizens) and the Union League which represented about the 1/3 of north Alabama's white citizens who had remained as loyalists in the Civil War or had otherwise opposed secession in 1861.

The convention adopted what was considered a liberal platform for the time including "equal rights for all men without distinction of color." The convention also endorsed the platform of the National Republican Party and supported free public education for all Alabamians. The convention established the first State Republican Executive Committee of 24 members. It included 12 prominent native Alabamians whom had mostly been unionists. The other members included three carpetbaggers, five African-Americans, and four otherwise unaffiliated and unidentified individuals.

=== Early history (1868–1890) ===
In 1868, William Hugh Smith was elected to a single two-year term as the state's first Republican governor. That same year saw Republican Andrew Applegate elected as the first-ever lieutenant governor of Alabama under the state's newly adopted constitution of 1867. That first post Civil War legislature under the new constitution was elected in February, 1868, with a 100-member House of Representatives (two-year terms) composed of 97 Republicans and 3 Democrats. The State Senate (four-year terms) was even more lopsided, with a single Democrat to its 32 Republicans. The 1868 legislature also included 27 Black Republicans, the first minority members in Alabama history. All but one were members of the House of Representatives. That same year Benjamin F. Royal (1868–1875) of Bullock County became the first black state senator in Alabama history. That Republican-controlled legislature passed a resolution on November 24, 1869, approving the 15th Amendment to the U.S. Constitution guaranteeing black men the right to vote in Alabama. Governor Smith was defeated for re-election in 1870, garnering 49.5% of the vote and losing by a margin of just 1,439 votes. Although the Senate was not up for re-election that year, Democrats retook the House with 57 seats to the Republicans 38 seats, of which 19 were African-American Republicans.

After Republicans spent a single term out of the governor's office, David P. Lewis was elected as the state's second GOP governor, winning 89,020 to 78,524 over his Democratic opponent. He served from 1872 to 1874. His GOP lieutenant governor was Alexander McKinstry. During Governor Lewis' term, disputed election results produced two competing legislatures, one with a Democratic majority and the other a Republican majority. After this dispute was ultimately settled, Republicans had a two-seat majority in the House and Democrats a 1-seat majority in the Senate. Again, this 1872 legislature included 24 African-American Republican members with five being in the Senate. The 1874 legislature would see only 13 Republican Senators and House membership at 40. However, this legislature would hit a high-water mark for minority representation with 33 African-American Republicans. The 1876 election would result in 18 members (seven of which were African-American) being elected to the House and only 4 Republicans to the Senate. Republicans would be reduced to just eight members in the House in the 1878 election. Following the 1880 election Republicans held only a single seat in the Alabama House with the election of Benjamin M. Long from Walker County. In fact, Walker County had a strong Republican Party for much of the remainder of the 19th century.

Republican representation in the legislature and other public offices had declined rapidly after the 1875 Constitution was adopted. That document began the process of restricting black voter participation and expanding all forms of Jim Crow laws. Further orchestrated efforts at voter intimidation, lynchings, vote fraud, and the inability of differing Republican factions to work together all doomed the party to long-term failure. After the 1878 election no black, and few Republicans, would be elected to the legislature again until the 1970s.

During this same Reconstruction period three African-American Republicans were elected to the United States Congress from Alabama. They were Benjamin Turner (42nd Congress), James T. Rapier (43rd Congress) and Jeremiah Haralson (44th Congress). However, the first Republican Congressmen from Alabama were elected in 1868. They were Charles W. Buckley (40th and 41st Congress'), Francis W. Kellogg, Benjamin W. Norris, Charles W. Pierce, John B. Callis, and Thomas Haughey who would be assassinated in Alabama while giving a speech. The first Republican Senators from Alabama were Willard Warner (1868–1871) and George E. Spencer (1868–1879) who were both elected by the legislature before adoption of the Seventeenth Amendment to the U.S. Constitution.

=== Alabama Republicans and the Populists (1890–1916) ===
By the late 1890s, a coalition between the Populist Party and the Republican Party often produced "fusion tickets", that combined forces in several subsequent elections to win control of several of Alabama hill counties in this era. They were most dominant in Marshall, St. Clair, Shelby, and Chilton Counties. Between 1892 and 1932 Shelby County was usually closely contested under the leadership of A. P. Longshore. Marshall County elected Republican Thomas Kennamer in 1896 to the Alabama House of Representatives. DeKalb County voted in 1896 for GOP Presidential candidate William McKinley. Chilton County was decidedly Republican between 1900 and 1912, including electing Lewis W. Reynolds as a Republican Probate Judge in 1904 and again in 1916. S. J. Petree was elected as a Republican Probate Judge in Franklin County in 1910; C. C. Scheuing was elected Cullman County Sheriff in 1910; J. B. Sloan was elected as a Republican to the State Senate from a district made up of Blount, Cullman, and Winston Counties. In 1910, J. J. Curtis of Winston County became the first Republican Circuit Judge (for Winston & Walker Counties) in Alabama since Reconstruction.

In this time period, in the 54th United States Congress, two brothers, Truman H. Aldrich (1896–1897) and William F. Aldrich (1896–1897), both served as Republicans. William Aldrich also served in the 55th Congress (1898–99) and the 56th Congress (1900–01) with the unusual distinction of having been seated all three times in disputed elections ultimately decided by Congress itself. After William Aldrich left Congress in 1901, no Republican would be elected again until 1964.

=== Post Office Republicans (1916–1962) ===
Following the end of the populist era, Republicans effectively competed in just a few isolated hill counties, mostly in north Alabama. While the Reconstruction period saw their strongest voting base in the Black Belt counties, Republicans during this period relied on the north Alabama counties that had never been strong proponents of the institution of slavery. The GOP garnered its support from a coalition of small farmers, blacks, labor, prohibitionists, etc. Again, these were often voters primarily from counties across the northern width of the state like Lawrence, Blount, Cullman, Walker, Winston, and DeKalb counties. Many of these counties regularly elected some Republicans to local office or occasionally to the state legislature well into the 1920s. However, only Winston County reliably elected Republicans to almost all offices as the county had attempted to secede from Alabama during the Civil War and has always been considered ancestrally Republican. During this prolonged period the Alabama GOP atrophied as a political party and became heavily dependent on federal patronage for its existence. The federal appointments during Republican administrations in Washington for such offices as local postmasters, U.S. Attorneys, and federal judgeships became the only real presence of a Republican Party to most of the state. The state party usually returned thanks for this patronage by pledging its National Convention delegates to the supporting administration, thus making control of the party only about seats at the National Conventions and the issue of patronage. This situation caused its members to be derisively called "Post Office Republicans" both inside and outside of the party. Since most of the party's effort and energy was to securing those federal offices rather than trying to win actual election at the ballot box the party almost died completely by the late 1950s. The most important and prominent of these Republican appointees would occur when President Eisenhower appointed Winston County's Frank M. Johnson to a Federal District Judgeship. Ironically, Johnson's frequent pro civil rights rulings from the bench would make him a hero to liberal Democrats and widely disliked in his own party. Johnson's owe father had briefly served in the state legislature as a Republican from 1942 to 1944.

=== The Goldwater Landslide and the modern GOP (1962–1972) ===
The modern Republican Party in Alabama traces its roots back to the election of John Grenier as State Party Chairman in 1962. That year Grenier with the support of the Alabama Young Republicans forced long-time Chairman Claude O. Vardaman into retirement without a contest. Grenier, along with a new generation of political activists played leading roles in re-organizing the party and moving beyond the "Post Office Republican" era. Determined to change the focus back to winning elections they recruited serious candidates for Congress in 1962. That year they nearly toppled U.S. Senator Lister Hill with the candidacy of James D. Martin in a controversial race that Republicans have always maintained was "stolen" in the dead of the night. Two years later most of those same candidates for Congress would run again in 1964, resulting in a Republican sweep of five of Alabama's eight congressional seats with victories by Jack Edwards, Glenn Andrews, James D. Martin, John Buchanan and Bill Dickinson. Martin would give up his congressional seat two years later in an unsuccessful run for governor against Lurleen Wallace, but the GOP would hold three of the congressional seats for decades to come. That election, commonly referred to in Alabama as "The Goldwater Landslide" would see the GOP win several dozen local offices. It also included the election of Probate Judges in Cullman County named Guy Hunt and Perry O. Hooper, Sr., in Montgomery County. Both would later go on to greater electoral successes. The 1964 election is credited as partially laying the foundations for Alabama's modern Republican Party. Among the party's other prominent officeholders in the period was George G. Siebels, Jr. who served two terms as Mayor of Birmingham from 1967 to 1975. In 1968, the party went through a nasty internal struggle for Alabama's seat on the Republican National Committee. John Grenier would lose that contest to Jim Martin. It would take many years to heal the rift the bitter race had caused between two old friends and their respective supporters in the party.

=== Statewide primary and the 1986 election (1972–2010) ===
In 1972, the state party made a historic change from a state convention nominating system for all candidates to having a statewide party primary. This allowed voters to directly choose all nominees for public and party offices with its main goal being to broaden public support for the party. It would only slowly have that desired effect. In 1978, the party would begin its long steady build-up to competing for seats in the legislature by winning a few seats in suburban Birmingham, Mobile, and Montgomery. In 1980, Jeremiah Denton became the first popularly elected Republican U. S. Senator in Alabama history after first winning that new statewide primary.

In 1982, Emory Folmar who would serve as Mayor of Montgomery (1977–1999) would make the party's first serious run for governor since Martin in 1966. However, four years later in 1986, the wisdom of the change to a primary finally paid huge dividends for the GOP. Guy Hunt in a very unusual election would defeat the Democrat with 57% of the vote in the governor's race. Hunt had been chosen in a statewide primary and the Democrat's disqualified their nominee claiming he had "unfairly" won their primary. Voters rewarded the GOP by electing Guy Hunt. Hunt's election is widely viewed as effectively making Alabama a two-party state even though Republicans only made very modest legislative gains that year. The victory in the governor's race in 1986 was the first Republican win in a statewide constitutional office since Reconstruction, ending 114 years of Democratic control. Almost immediately the party became focused on winning the other statewide races (lieutenant governor, attorney general, secretary of state, state treasurer, state auditor, commissioner of agriculture and the Public Service Commission). In 1994, Perry O. Hooper, Sr. would defeat the incumbent Democratic chief justice of Alabama in another controversial race. That same year Republicans increased their total in the Alabama House of Representatives from 24 to 31 seats. Legislative membership continued to modestly climb each cycle and Republicans began winning other statewide offices. Republicans also won the state auditor's race and the secretary of state's office.

=== Republican dominance (2010–present) ===
The move to GOP hegemony in the statewide offices occurred fairly quickly. In the November 2010 general election 136 years of Democratic control of the Alabama state legislature finally came to an end. That day, the GOP won large majorities in both chambers gaining 17 seats in the House and 11 in the State Senate. Within another two weeks four additional House seats moved to the GOP column as four self-styled conservatives bolted from the Democrats to the GOP just after they had been re-elected. Over the four-year term that followed another Democratic incumbent in the Senate would switch to being Republican as well as two more Democratic House members joining the GOP.

Also, in the 2010 general election, Republicans swept all statewide races electing Robert J. Bentley as governor and Kay Ivey defeating the Democratic incumbent in the lieutenant governor's race. Republicans have won seven of the last eight governors races dating back to 1986. In 2012 Democrats lost the last statewide office still in their possession.

On April 10, 2017, Lt. Governor Kay Ivey became Alabama's 54th Governor upon the resignation of Robert J. Bentley. She became the second woman in Alabama history to hold the governorship.

As of 2021, Republicans hold both of Alabama's U.S. Senate seats and six of its seven seats in the U.S. House of Representatives. Until December 2017, no Democrat had been elected to the U. S. Senate from the state since 1992 when Richard Shelby was elected to a second term. Shelby switched parties in 1994 and has since been re-elected easily. On December 12, 2017, Democrat Doug Jones defeated Republican Nominee Roy Moore in a special election, and took office on January 3, 2018. He was defeated by Tommy Tuberville on November 3, 2020.

The GOP has won six consecutive races for attorney general dating back to 1994. Six of the eight seats on the State Board of Education have elected Republicans. The Alabama Supreme Court, State Appeals Courts, and the rest of the state judiciary are moving decisively to Republican dominance. All nine Supreme Court justices and the ten judges who sit on the two statewide appellate courts are all Republicans. The partisan line-up of Circuit Judges following the 2016 general election consists of 82 Republicans and 66 Democrats. However, the Democrats judgeships are increasing limited to urban area as 34 of their 66 judgeships are in just Jefferson and Montgomery counties, while the GOP judgeships are spread among 38 different counties. As of October 2017, the GOP has a majority on the district courts with 62 seats to the Democrats 42. It is all the more dramatic when one considers that there were less than one half dozen GOP judges in Alabama prior to 1986.

As of March 1, 2016, of the 351 county commissioners in Alabama's 67 counties, the partisan breakdown is 183 Republicans and 168 Democrats. 37 Courthouses had Republican majority County Commissions, 28 had Democratic majorities, and 2 were evenly split. Of Alabama's 67 elected county school boards, the breakdown of seats heading into the 2016 General Election is 201 Republicans and 172 Democrats. However, the GOP has a majority on 33 of those boards and the Democrats also have a majority on 33 with one remaining board being evenly split in Pike County.

== Party chairman and officers ==
The chairperson of the Alabama Republican Party is Scott Stadthagen, who was elected at a party meeting on March 7, 2026.

The secretary of the Alabama Republican Party also elected on February 27, 2021, is Carol Jahns of Prattville Autauga County. She succeeded Josh Dodd of Lauderdale County who served a single two-year term in the post. The party treasurer is Sallie Bryant of Jefferson County who has held the post since mid-2017 and was re-elected in both 2019 and 2021. The longest-serving chairman in state party history was Claude O. Vardaman of Birmingham, who held the post for twenty years from 1942 to 1962. The first chairman of the Alabama GOP was John C. Keffer (1867) of Montgomery, who was an agent for the Freedmen's Bureau.

== Current elected officials ==
=== Members of Congress ===
==== U.S. Senate ====
Republicans have controlled Alabama's Class III seat in the U.S. Senate since 1994 when incumbent Senator Richard Shelby switched from the Democratic Party to the Republican Party. Shelby was subsequently re-elected to a third term in 1998:

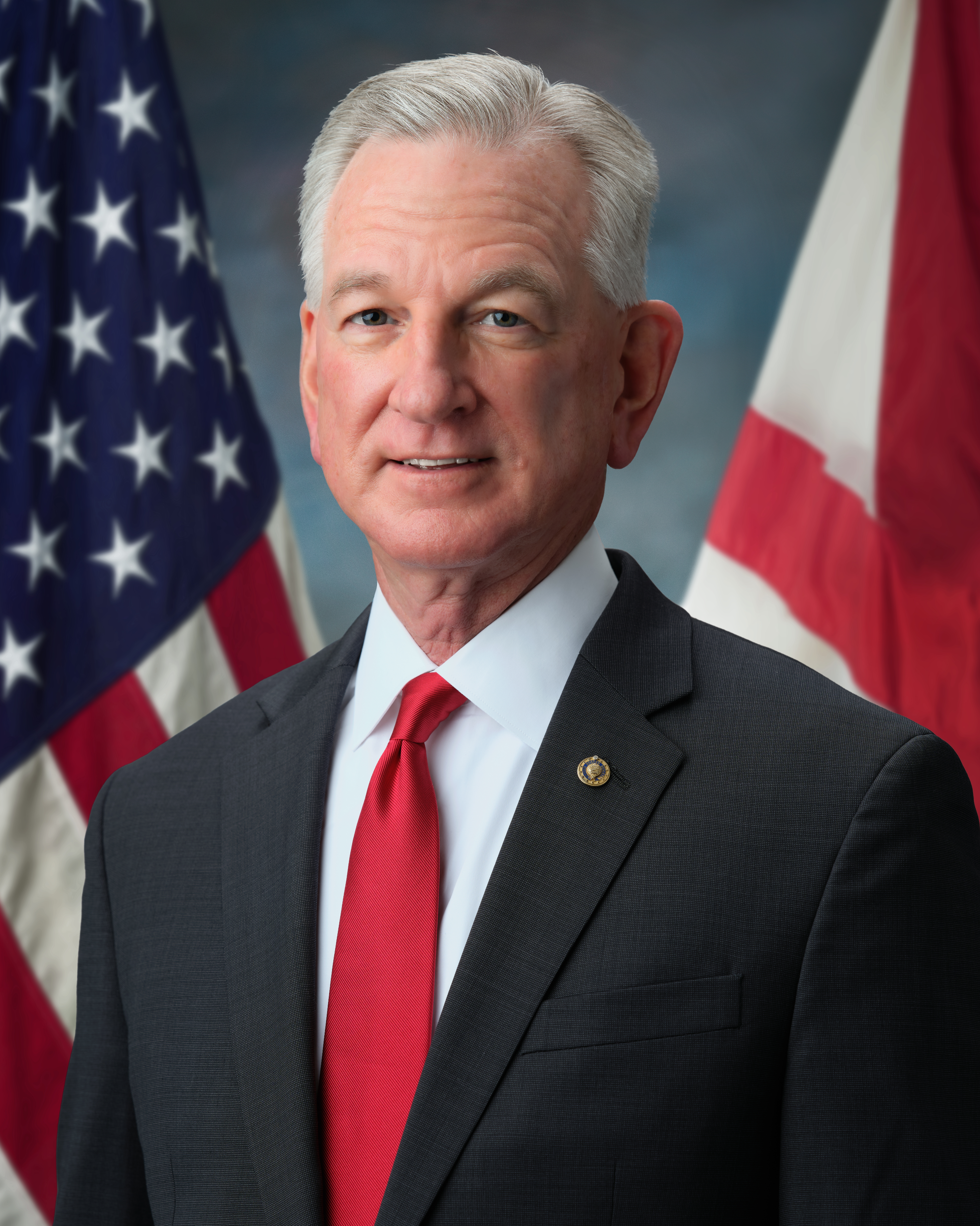
Senior U.S. Senator Tommy Tuberville

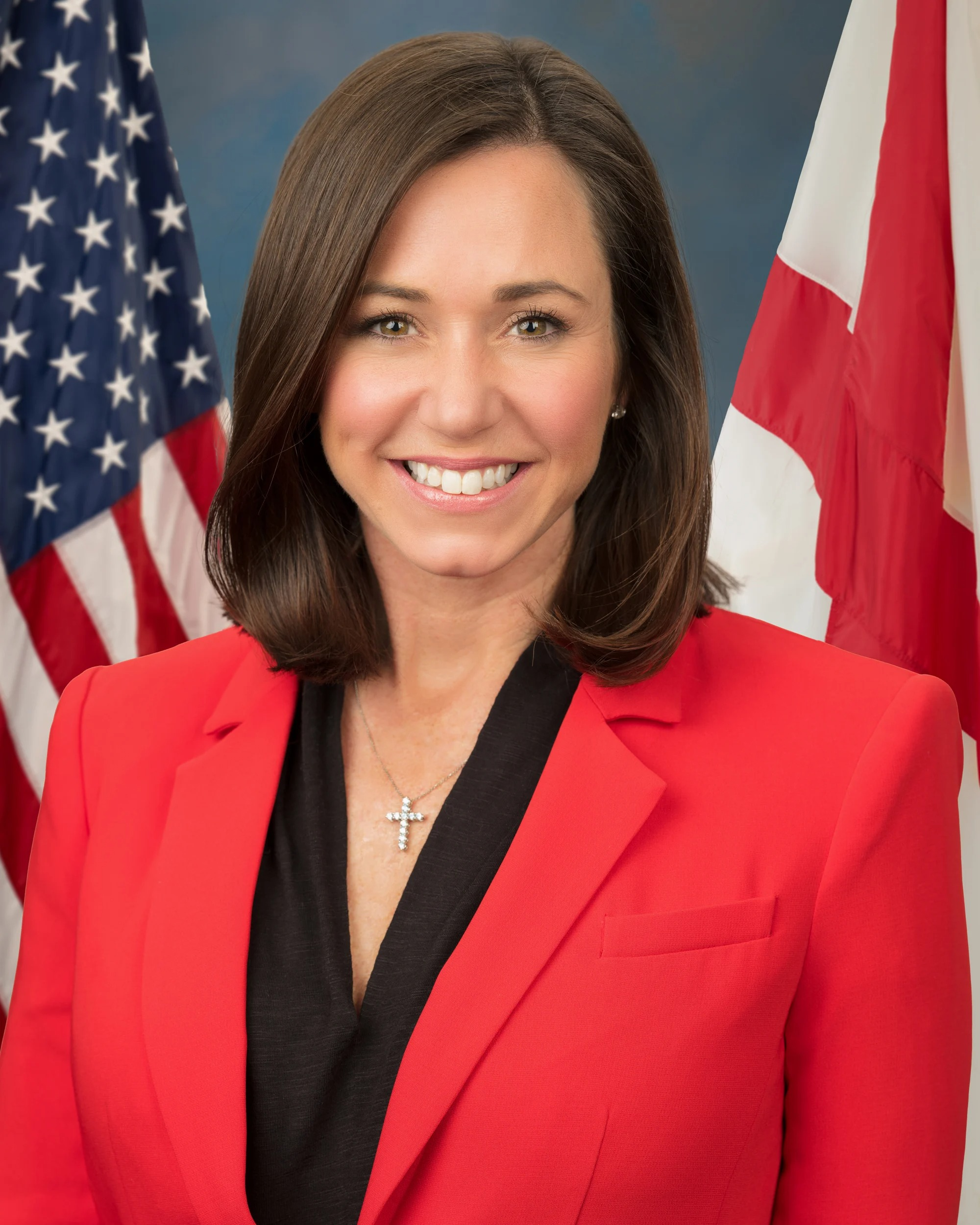
Junior (pre-Senior) U.S. Senator Katie Britt

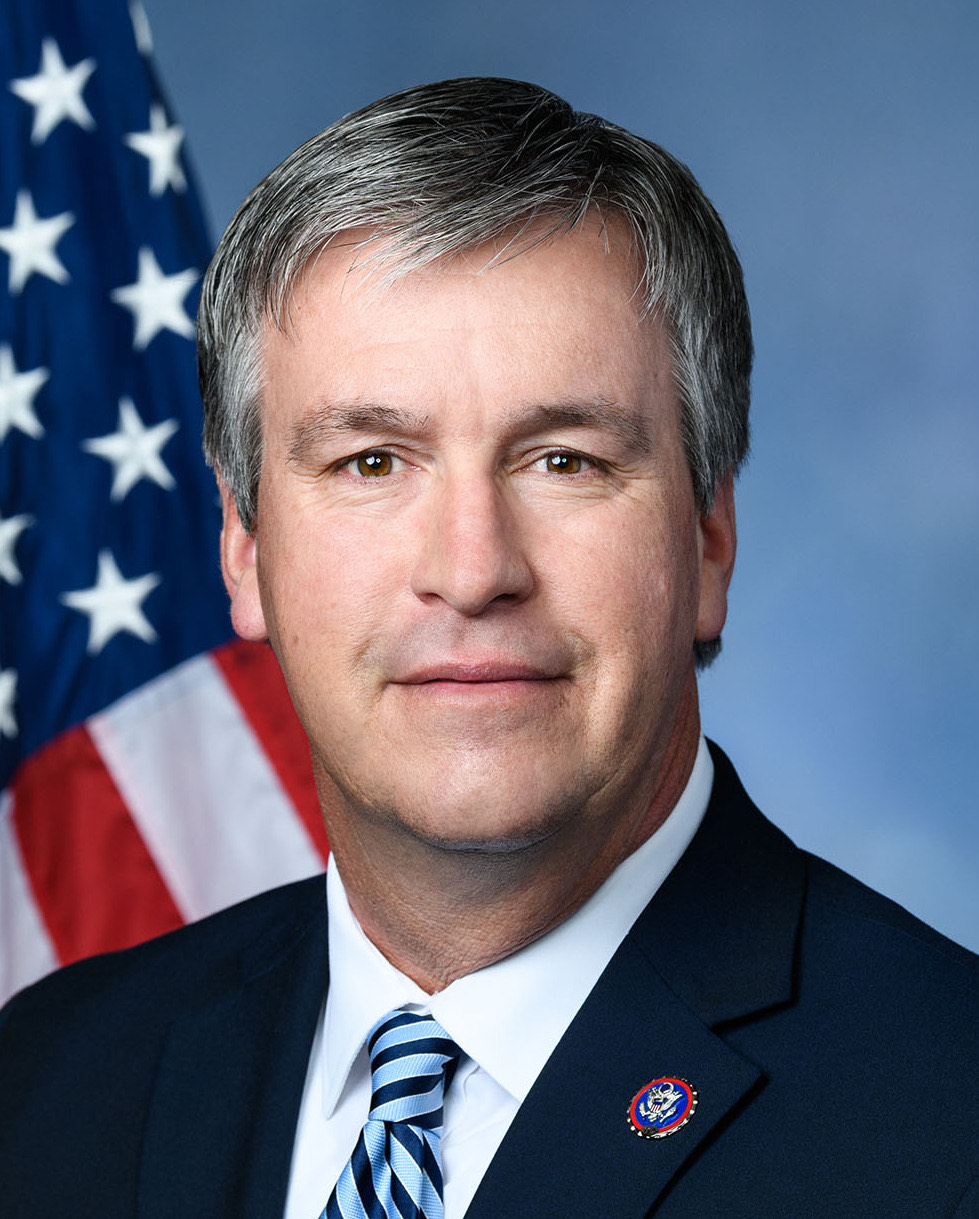
Pre-junior U.S. Senator-elect Barry Moore

==== U.S. House of Representatives ====
Out of the 7 seats Alabama is apportioned in the U.S. House of Representatives, 5 are held by Republicans:

Alabama Republicans in House of Representatives
District	Member	Photo
1st	Barry Moore	
1st	Jerry Carl (elect)	
3rd	Mike Rogers	
4th	Robert Aderholt	
5th	Dale Strong	
6th	Gary Palmer	

=== Statewide Constitutional Offices ===
Republicans control all seven of the elected statewide offices:

- Governor: Kay Ivey → Tommy Tuberville (elect)
- Lieutenant Governor: Will Ainsworth → John Wahl (elect)
- Attorney General: Steve Marshall → Katherine Robertson (elect)
- Secretary of State: Wes Allen → Caroleene Dobson (elect)
- State Auditor: Andrew Sorrell
- State Treasurer: Young Boozer
- Commissioner of Agriculture and Industries: Rick Pate

=== Statewide Statutory Offices ===
- Alabama Public Service Commission
- President - Cynthia Almond
- Associate Commissioner - Place 1 - Jeremy H. Oden
- Associate Commissioner - Place 2 - Chris "Chip" Beeker, Jr.

=== Supreme Court of Alabama ===
- Chief Justice: Sarah Hicks Stewart
- Associate Justice: Brady E. Mendheim Jr.
- Associate Justice: Tommy Bryan
- Associate Justice: William Sellers
- Associate Justice: Bill Lewis
- Associate Justice: Alisa Kelli Wise
- Associate Justice: Greg Shaw
- Associate Justice: Chris McCool
- Associate Justice: Greg Cook

=== Alabama Court of Civil Appeals ===
- William C. Thompson, Presiding Judge
- Christy O. Edwards
- Matt Fridy
- Chad Arthur Hanson
- Terry A. Moore

=== Alabama Court of Criminal Appeals ===
- Mary Becker Windom, Presiding Judge
- Richard J. Minor
- Beth Kellum
- J. Chris McCool
- James William "Bill" Cole

=== State Legislature ===
- Senate
  - Current senators
  - President Pro Tempore of the Senate: Garlan Gudger (SD4)
  - Senate Majority Leader: Steve Livingston (SD8)
- House of Representatives
  - Current representatives
  - Speaker of the House: Nathaniel Ledbetter (HD24)
  - Speaker Pro Tempore: Chris Pringle (HD101)
  - House Majority Leader: Paul Lee (HD86)

== Recent election cycles ==
=== 2014 ===
Republicans held onto every seat in their legislative majority in 2014. In fact, increasing their numbers again in both chambers by defeating incumbent Democrats and winning open seats. They added three State Senate seats to hold 26 to just 8 Democrats and 1 Independent. In the House they added five more seats taking their majority to 72 seats for the GOP and just 33 for the Democrats. Yet as recently as 1977, there were no Republicans in either chamber of the Alabama Legislature until a lone seat in Mobile County was won that year in a special election. In 2014, Governor Bentley received almost 64% of the vote, leading a sweep of all statewide offices that also included the re-election of Lieutenant Governor Kay Ivey, the state's first female Republican Lieutenant Governor. GOP U.S. Senator, Jeff Sessions was unopposed for a fourth term, the first time in state history that Democrats failed to produce a nominee.

=== 2016 ===
The GOP Presidential nominee, Donald Trump, handily carried the state in 2016 taking 62.1% of the vote over Hillary Clinton. This was the 10th straight GOP Presidential nominee to carry the state; the last Democrats to carry Alabama were Jimmy Carter in 1976 and John F. Kennedy in 1960. However, Carter only received a plurality of the vote and Kennedy only received 5 of the 11 Electoral Votes of the state with the other six going to Virginia U.S. Senator Harry F. Byrd. Senator Richard Shelby was re-elected that year as well as the state's six Republican congressman.

=== 2018 ===
In the November 6, 2018, general election, Republicans swept to an easy victory in every statewide contest with Governor Kay Ivey winning a full term with over 59% of the vote. Will Ainsworth received over 60% in the lieutenant governor's race and Tom Parker defeated Democrat Bob Vance, Jr. by more than 15 points in the race for Chief Justice. Democrats also lost another five seats in the Alabama House of Representatives making the new lineup to be 77 Republicans and 28 Democrats. Republicans held all their seats in both legislative chambers and also added one additional seat in the State Senate making the upper chambers partisan alignment to be 27 Republicans and 8 Democrats.

=== 2020 ===
In the November 3, 2020, general election, Alabama had a 62.19% turnout. President Trump carried Alabama with 62.15% of the vote, making it the 11th straight Republican presidential victory in the state. In the U.S. Senate race, Tommy Tuberville defeated U.S. Senator Doug Jones with 60.21%. Jones 39.62% was the weakest percentage for an incumbent Democratic U.S. Senator in Alabama since the direct election of U.S. Senators began in 1914. Republicans easily won all six U.S. Representative races in which they fielded candidates. This included 64.88% in the open 1st District with the election of Jerry Carl and the open 2nd District where GOP nominee, Barry Moore received 65.30%. Republicans won all the statewide races. This included both seats on the Alabama Supreme Court, two seats on the Court of Civil Appeals, and two seats on the Court of Criminal Appeals, in which the Democrats had failed to field candidates. Only in the statewide race for the Presidency of the Public Service Commission did the Democrats run a candidate. That individual lost to the incumbent Republican, Twinkle Andress Cavanaugh, who won a third term with 62.09% of the vote.

=== 2022 ===
In the November 8, 2022, general election Republicans swept all statewide elections. They maintained overwhelming control of the state legislature capturing 28 of the 35 State Senate seats and also held 77 of the 105 State House seats. Governor Kay Ivey won a second full term winning 66.93% of the vote over the Democratic nominee and a Libertarian candidate. Long-time U.S. Senator Richard Shelby did not seek re-election. He was succeeded by Katie Britt who captured 66.64% of the vote becoming the first woman "elected" from the state. Two women had served partial "unexpired terms" upon appointment by the governor. They were Maryon Pittman Allen (1978) and Dixie Bibb Graves (1937–38).

Alabama is one of the more staunchly Republican states in the nation. According to the Gallup polling organization, Alabama is the eighth most Republican state in the nation.

== Past chairs of the Alabama Republican Party ==
Chair	Years of service	County	Other facts
John C. Keffer	1867	Montgomery	founding Chrm.; Delegate, Constitutional Convention (1867); Secretary of Alabama Republican Party (1870–1872)
Benjamin White Norris	1868–1870	Elmore	member, 40th U. S. Congress (1868–1869)
Thomas O. Glasscock	1870	Montgomery	Mayor of Montgomery (1868–1870)
Gen. Robert Wallace Healy	1870–1872	Montgomery	U. S. Marshal (1867–1874)
DeWitt C. Whiting	1872–1874	Montgomery	Secretary of Alabama State Senate (1870)
Charles E. Mayer	1874–1875	Mobile	youngest Chairman at age 28
William Hugh Smith	1875–1878	Randolph	21st Governor of Alabama (1868–1870)
John Van McDuffie	1878-	Lowndes	member, 51st U. S. Congress (1890–1891)
George E. Turner	1882–1884	Montgomery	U.S. Senator, Washington State (1897–1903)
Chester Arthur Bingham, Sr.	1884–1886?	Talladega	9th Treasurer of Alabama (1868–1870)
Dr. Robert A. Moseley, Jr.	1888–1896	Talladega	Confederate Army, 41st Alabama Infantry
Dr. William A. Vaughn	1896–1900	Jefferson	U.S. District Attorney (1897–1902)
Julius Wester Davidson	1901–1902	Bibb	Delegate, GOP Natl Convention (1904)
Willard I. Wellman	1902–1904	Madison	Huntsville's Wellman Park named in his honor in 2002.
Joseph Oswalt Thompson	1904–1911	Macon	GOP nominee for Governor (1910)
Pope McFarland Long	1911–1916	Walker	U.S. Marshal (1905–1914)
Frank S. Rea	1918	Jefferson?	Treasurer, Alabama Republican Party(1916–1918)
Pope McFarland Long	1920–1922	Walker	
John M. Atkins	? – 1923	Cleburne	Delegate, GOP Natl Convention (1916, 1924)
Alexander C. Birch	1923–1925?	Mobile	U. S. Attorney (1927–1935)
Lewis Henry Reynolds	1925–1927	Chilton	U. S. Attorney (1924–1931)
Balpha Lonnie Noojin, Sr.	1928–1931	Etowah	GOP Natl Committeeman (1938–1950), basketball & baseball Coach, U. of Alabama (1918)
Dr. Joseph C. Swann, Sr.	1931–1941	Randolph	GOP Natl Committeeman (1932–1936)
Claude O. Vardaman	1942–1962	Jefferson	Longest-serving chairman (20 years); Delegate, GOP Natl Convention (1944, 1948, 1952, 1956, 1960)
John Grenier	1962–1964	Jefferson	Executive Director-Republican National Committee (1964–1965)
Dr. Thomas H. Bingham	1964–1966	Jefferson	Acting/interim chairman during John Grenier's involvement with Goldwater campaign
Alfred W. Goldthwaite	1966	Montgomery	Member, Alabama House of Representatives (1962–1966)
Charles O. Smith	1966–1969	Franklin	Alternate Delegate, GOP Natl Convention (1956)
J. Richard "Dick" Bennett	1969–1975	Butler	Delegate, GOP Natl Convention (1956, 1964); instrumental in creation of Capitol Club
W. Edgar Welden	1975–1977	Jefferson	GOP Natl Committman (1997–2008); executive director, Alabama GOP (1969–1975)
William D. "Bill" Harris	1977–1985	Jefferson	Chief Executive Officer, Republican National Convention (1992, 2004, 2012)
Emory M. Folmar	1985–1989	Montgomery	Mayor of Montgomery (1977–1999)
Arthur R. Outlaw	1989–1990	Mobile	Mayor of Mobile (1967–1969 and 1985–1989)
J. Elbert Peters	1990–1991	Madison	U.S. Presidential Elector (1988, 2004, 2008, 2012, 2016)
Spencer T. Bachus, III	1991–1992	Jefferson	U.S. Congress, 6th District (1993–2015)
J. Elbert Peters	1992–1995	Madison	
Roger E. McConnell	1995–1999	Mobile	past chairman, Mobile County Executive Committee
Winton M. Blount, III	1999–2001	Montgomery	Delegate, GOP Natl Convention (1988); prominent businessman, party activist for 40 years
Marty Connors	2001–2005	Shelby	Executive Director-Alabama GOP (1985–1988); Delegate, GOP Natl Convention (1992, 2004)
Twinkle Andress Cavanaugh	2005–2007	Montgomery	Alabama Public Service Commission (2010–present) and serving as its president since 2012 when she defeated the last statewide Democratic officeholder
Mike Hubbard	2007–2011	Lee	Member, Alabama House of Representatives (1998–2016); Speaker of the House (2010–2016)
Bill Armistead	2011–2015	Shelby	Alabama State Senator (1994–2002), GOP nominee, Lt. Gov. (2002)
Terry Lathan	2015–2021	Mobile	past chairman, Mobile County Executive Committee; U.S. Presidential Elector (2012)
John Wahl	2021–2026	Limestone	past Senior Vice Chairman of the Alabama Republican Party (2019–2021)
Scott Stadthagen	2026–present	Morgan	past Majority Leader of the Alabama House of Representatives (2023–2026); member, Alabama House of Representatives (2019–present)

== Republican governors of Alabama ==
- William Hugh Smith (1868–1870)
- David P. Lewis (1872–1874)
- H. Guy Hunt (1987–1993)
- Fob James (1995–1999)
- Bob Riley (2003–2011)
- Robert J. Bentley (2011–2017)
- Kay Ivey (2017–present)

== Republican lieutenant governors of Alabama ==
- Andrew Applegate (1868–1870)
- Alexander McKinstry (1872–1874)
- Steve Windom (1999–2003)
- Kay Ivey (2011–2017)
- Will Ainsworth (2019–present)

== Republican attorneys general of Alabama ==
- Joshua Morse (1868–1869)
- Benjamin Gardner (1872–1873)
- Jeff Sessions (1995–1997)
- William H. Pryor, Jr. (1997–2004)
- Troy King (2004–2011)
- Luther Strange (2011–2017)
- Steve Marshall (2017–present)

== Prominent Alabama Republicans ==
- Winton M. Blount, Postmaster General of the United States (1969–1972)
- William J. Cabaniss, United States Ambassador to Czech Republic (2004–2006)
- William Hooper Councill, black educator and first President of Alabama A&M University
- Jeremiah Denton, U.S. Senator (1981–1987) and war hero
- William Brevard Hand, U.S. District Judge (1971–1989)
- Frank Minis Johnson, United States District Judge (1955–1979); U.S. Court of Appeals Judge (1979–1999)
- F. David Mathews, U. S. Secretary of Health, Education & Welfare (1975–1977)
- William H. Pryor, Jr., Chief Judge, 11th U. S. Circuit Court of Appeals
- Condoleezza Rice, U. S. Secretary of State (2005–2009)
- Edwina Rogers, General Counsel to the Republican National Committee (1994) and prominent Washington lobbyist
- Jeff Sessions, Attorney General of the United States (2017–2018)
- Margaret D. Tutwiler, United States Ambassador to Morocco (2001–2003)
- Booker T. Washington, educator, civil rights leader, and first president of Tuskegee University
- Heather Whitestone, Miss America (1995)

== Electoral history ==
=== Gubernatorial ===
Alabama Republican Party gubernatorial election results
Election	Gubernatorial candidate	Votes	Vote %	Result
1994	Fob James	604,926	50.33%	Won ✓
1998	Fob James	546,504	42.08%	Lost ✗
2002	Bob Riley	672,225	49.17%	Won ✓
2006	Bob Riley	718,327	57.45%	Won ✓
2010	Robert J. Bentley	860,472	57.58%	Won ✓
2014	Robert J. Bentley	750,231	63.56%	Won ✓
2018	Kay Ivey	1,022,457	59.46%	Won ✓
2022	Kay Ivey	946,932	66.91%	Won ✓
2026	Tommy Tuberville	873,332	52.00%	Won ✓

== See also ==
- Political party strength in Alabama
- List of state parties of the Republican Party (United States)

== Works cited ==
- Abbott, Richard (1986). The Republican Party and the South, 1855-1877: The First Southern Strategy. University of North Carolina Press. ISBN 0807816809.
