= Jean Brown (judge) =

American judge

Jean Williams Brown
- Born: 1952 (age 73–74); Birmingham, Alabama, U.S.
- Agent: judge

Jean Williams Brown (born c. 1952) is a former justice of the Supreme Court of Alabama, serving from 1999 to 2005.

Brown was born around 1952 and raised in Birmingham, Alabama. She earned her bachelor's degree from Samford University in 1974 and a Juris Doctor from the University of Alabama School of Law in 1977. During her legal career, she served as an assistant district attorney in Montgomery, Alabama and also serving as a judge of the Alabama Court of Criminal Appeals. In 1999, Brown was elected as a justice of the Supreme Court of Alabama. She was defeated for reelection in a 2005 campaign directed in part at her participation in a ruling requiring the removal of a statue of the Ten Commandments from state property. In 2019, Brown was appointed as a commissioner for the Alabama Department of Senior Services.

== See also ==
- List of female state supreme court justices
- List of justices of the Supreme Court of Alabama
- Supreme Court of Alabama

Political offices
Preceded by Janie Shores	Justice of the Supreme Court of Alabama; 1999–2005	Succeeded by Tom Parker
