= 2024 Lee County, Alabama, elections =

Local elections in Alabama, US

- November 5, 2024

A general election was held in the U.S. county of Lee County, Alabama, on November 5, 2024, to elect various representatives for the county. Primary elections were held on March 5, 2024.

== Board of Education ==
Elections will be held to elect four of seven members to the Lee County Board of Education, to serve six-year terms.

=== District 4 ===
==== Republican primary ====
===== Candidates =====
====== Nominee ======
- Roger Keel, incumbent Board of Education member

==== General election ====
===== Results =====
2024 Lee County Board of Education, District 4 election
Party	Candidate	Votes	%
Republican	Roger Keel (incumbent)	4,782	99.11%
Write-in		43	0.89%
Total votes		4,825	100.00%

=== District 5 ===
==== Republican primary ====
===== Candidates =====
====== Nominee ======
- Mary Ensley

==== General election ====
===== Results =====
2024 Lee County Board of Education, District 5 election
Party	Candidate	Votes	%
Republican	Mary Ensley	4,202	97.52%
Write-in		107	2.48%
Total votes		4,309	100.00%

=== District 6 ===
==== Democratic primary ====
===== Candidates =====
====== Nominee ======
- Larry Patterson, incumbent Board of Education member

==== General election ====
===== Results =====
2024 Lee County Board of Education, District 6 election
Party	Candidate	Votes	%
Democratic	Larry Patterson (incumbent)	2,286	92.40%
Write-in		188	7.60%
Total votes		2,474	100.00%

=== District 7 ===
==== Democratic primary ====
===== Candidates =====
====== Nominee ======
- Napoleon Stringer, incumbent Board of Education member

==== General election ====
===== Results =====
2024 Lee County Board of Education, District 7 election
Party	Candidate	Votes	%
Democratic	Napoleon Stringer (incumbent)	1,831	88.33%
Write-in		242	11.67%
Total votes		2,073	100.00%

== Judicial ==
=== Circuit clerk ===
The one circuit clerk position is up for election.

==== Republican primary ====
===== Candidates =====
====== Nominee ======
- Mary B. Roberson, incumbent circuit clerk

==== General election ====
===== Results =====
2024 Lee County District Court circuit clerk election
Party	Candidate	Votes	%
Republican	Mary B. Roberson (incumbent)	51,525	97.91%
Write-in		1,101	2.09%
Total votes		52,626	100.00%

=== District Court judge, place 2 ===
One of two District Court judge positions in Lee County is up for election.

==== Republican primary ====
Three candidates filed to run in the Republican primary.

===== Candidates =====
====== Nominee ======
- Samantha Burt Copelan, felony contract defense attorney, and prosecutor for the City of Auburn

====== Eliminated in primary ======
- Harold W. Morris, criminal defense attorney
- Clay Thomas

===== Results =====
Republican primary
Party	Candidate	Votes	%
Republican	Samantha Burt Copelan	8,351	57.06
Republican	Clay Thomas	3,993	27.28
Republican	Harold W. Morris	2,292	15.66
Total votes		14,636	100.00

==== Democratic primary ====
===== Candidates =====
====== Nominee ======
- Kris Patton, attorney

==== General election ====
===== Results =====
2024 Lee County District Court judge, place 2 election
Party	Candidate	Votes	%
Republican	Samantha Burt Copelan	46,545	64.98%
Democratic	Kris Patton	24,972	34.86%
Write-in		114	0.16%
Total votes		71,631	100.00%

=== Judge of probate ===
The one judge of probate position is up for election.

==== Republican primary ====
===== Candidates =====
====== Nominee ======
- Jere Colley Jr., attorney

==== General election ====
===== Results =====
2024 Lee County District Court judge of probate election
Party	Candidate	Votes	%
Republican	Jere Colley Jr.	51,459	97.79%
Write-in		1,162	2.21%
Total votes		52,621	100.00%

== Lee County Commission ==
=== District 1 ===
==== Republican primary ====
===== Candidates =====
====== Nominee ======
- Doug Cannon, incumbent commissioner (2020–present)

==== General election ====
===== Results =====
2024 Lee County Commission, District 1 election
Party	Candidate	Votes	%
Republican	Doug Cannon (incumbent)	9,543	97.05%
Write-in		290	2.95%
Total votes		9,833	100.00%

=== District 3 ===
==== Republican primary ====
===== Candidates =====
====== Nominee ======
- Jeff Drury, nominee for this district in 2012

====== Eliminated in primary ======
- Brian Davis
- Gary Long, incumbent commissioner

===== Results =====
Republican primary
Party	Candidate	Votes	%
Republican	Jeff Drury	1,582	54.18
Republican	Brian Davis	876	30.00
Republican	Gary Long (incumbent)	462	15.82
Total votes		2,920	100.00

==== General election ====
===== Results =====
2024 Lee County Commission, District 3 election
Party	Candidate	Votes	%
Republican	Jeff Drury	11,250	97.99%
Write-in		231	2.01%
Total votes		11,481	100.00%

=== District 5 ===
==== Democratic primary ====
===== Candidates =====
====== Nominee ======
- Richard LaGrand Sr., incumbent commissioner (2022–present)

==== General election ====
===== Results =====
2024 Lee County Commission, District 5 election
Party	Candidate	Votes	%
Democratic	Richard LaGrand Sr. (incumbent)	7,849	95.08%
Write-in		408	4.92%
Total votes		8,287	100.00%
