= John C. Tyson (judge) =

American jurist

John Caius Tyson (1926 – November 2, 2012) was an American jurist.

Tyson received his bachelors and law degrees from the University of Alabama, After working in the Alabama Attorney General office, Tyson was appointed to the Alabama Court of Criminal Appeals. He also served as a special justice on the Alabama Supreme Court.
