= Bill Harris (lobbyist) =

American lobbyist and operative of the Republican Party

William D. Harris is an American lobbyist and operative of the Republican Party. He was the chief executive officer of the 2004 Republican National Convention in New York City and was charged by the Republican National Committee with planning the quadrennial meeting at Madison Square Garden, which nominated George W. Bush for a second term as President of the United States.

Harris was CEO of the GOP conventions in Houston, Texas in 1992 and Tampa, Florida in 2012. He was the national convention director for the McCain/Palin campaign in 2008.

Harris was chairman of the Alabama Republican Party from 1977-1985 and its executive director from 1976-1977. He was a presidential elector from Alabama in 1984. He was a delegate to the GOP national convention in 1980 and 1984 again on both occasions from Alabama.

Harris is from Alabama and is a graduate of the University of Alabama. He lives in Washington, D.C. with his wife, Suzi Harris, who was chairman of the Jefferson County, Alabama Republican Executive Committee in the mid 1980s.
