= Will Sellers =

American judge (born 1963)

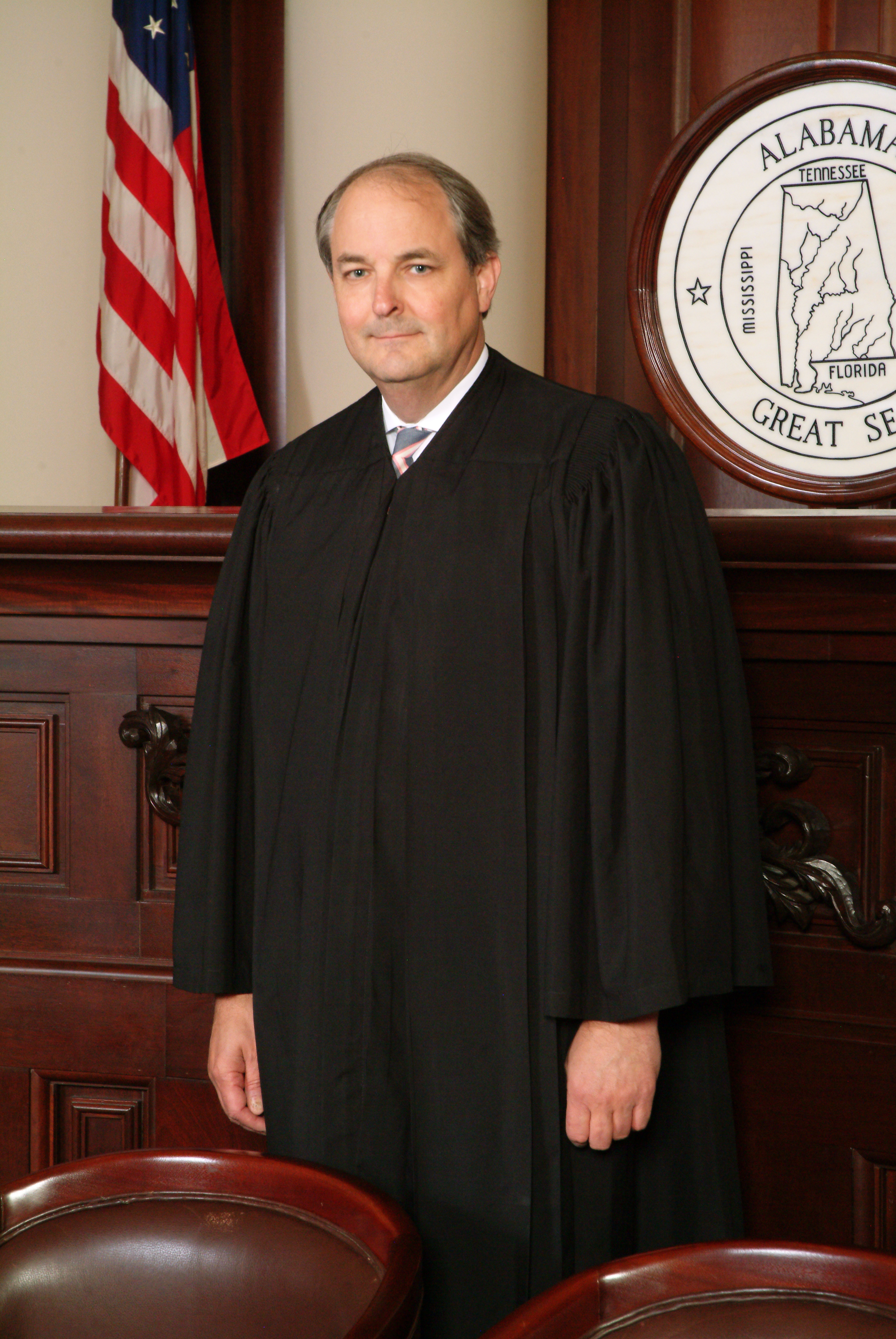

Associate Justice of the Supreme Court of Alabama
- Incumbent
- Assumed office May 25, 2017
- Appointed by: Kay Ivey
- Preceded by: Lyn Stuart

Personal details
- Born: William Burwell Sellers; February 10, 1963 (age 63) Montgomery, Alabama, U.S.
- Party: Republican
- Spouse: Lee Grant
- Children: 3
- Education: Hillsdale College (BA); University of Alabama (JD); New York University (LLM)

William Burwell Sellers (born February 10, 1963) is an American lawyer who has served as an associate justice of the Supreme Court of Alabama.

Sellers was born and raised in Montgomery, Alabama. He completed a Bachelor of Arts degree at Hillsdale College in Hillsdale, Michigan in 1985, with majors in history and political economy. He then completed a Juris Doctor degree at the University of Alabama School of Law in 1988, and a Master of Laws degree in Taxation at New York University in 1989.

Sellers was in private practice in Montgomery, Alabama from 1989 to 2017, specializing in tax law and litigation. He was a partner with the prominent Montgomery law firm Balch & Bingham, where his work mainly involved litigation with the Internal Revenue Service and the Alabama Department of Revenue. He has been active in many community organizations, including the Rotary Club, United Way, and the YMCA and received the President's Award for service in 2012 from the Alabama Bar Association.

In 2016, Sellers was a member of the electoral college, his 4th time to serve as a presidential elector from Alabama.

Governor Kay Ivey appointed Sellers as an associate justice of the Supreme Court of Alabama in May 2017, to replace Justice Lyn Stuart, who had been elevated to chief justice. Sellers previously served as chair of Ivey's successful campaigns for Lieutenant Governor of Alabama in 2010 and 2014.

Sellers ran for a full term in 2018 and was unopposed. Sellers's campaign was endorsed by the Business Council of Alabama, Alabama Society of CPAs, the Alabama Farmers Federation, The Alabama New South Coalition and the Alabama Civil Justice Reform Committee.

On January 16, 2023, Sellers administered the oath of office to Governor Kay Ivey.

On October 16, 2023, Sellers qualified to run for re-election for Associate Justice - Place 3. When the deadline for qualifying ended, Justice Sellers had no opposition in either the Republican primary or general election.

In the Alabama Supreme Court's ruling regarding frozen embryos, Sellers wrote a dissenting opinion.

Justice Sellers authored the majority opinion allowing for the appointment of a receiver for the City of Prichard Water Works and Sewer Board.

In the Court's decision reviewing responsibilities of landlords when dangerous conditions of the common areas of leased premises are open and obvious, Justice Sellers authored the dissenting opinion.

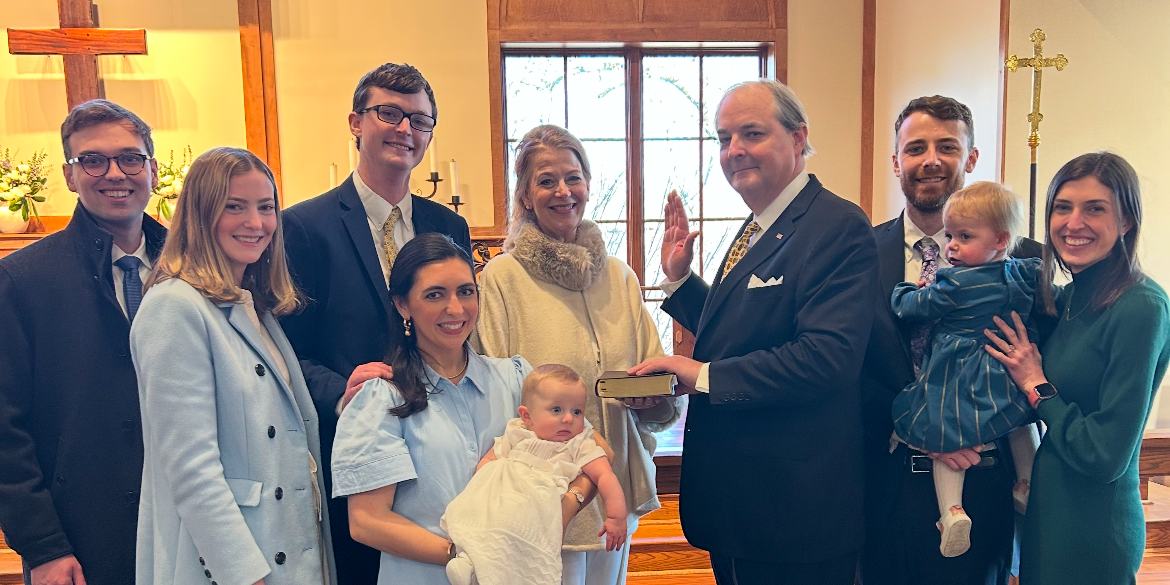
Justice Sellers Sworn in for 3rd Term

On November 5, 2024, Justice Sellers was elected to another six (6) year term with 98% of the vote. He was sworn in for his third term in January 2025. His current term expires in 2031.

Steve Flowers, Alabama's premier political journalist and commentator, said that Justice Sellers and his wife, Lee are part of Governor Ivey's small circle of close friends and confidants.

Justice Sellers wrote the majority opinion in the case of Jennings v. Smith, determining that when police are not provided accurate identifying information, they can ask a suspect to provide physical identification. Justice Sellers opinion has been roundly criticized by the SPLC and the American Civil Liberties Union.

Justice Sellers authored the Court's opinion upholding a 2025 state law regulating the sale of vaping products and electronic cigarettes and rejecting claims that the law violated the Constitution or was preempted by federal regulations.

Justice Sellers' articles on historical issues have appeared in: AL.com, The Daily Caller, Findlaw.com, City Journal, Montgomery Advertiser, The American Spectator, Alabama Political Reporter, Tuscaloosa News, Yellowhammer News, American Institute for Economic Research, Alabama Today, Alabama Daily News, 1819 News, Alabama Gazette

In October of 2026, the George Mason Law review published Justice Sellers article called: "The Declaration of Independence as Legal Text: Reconsidering Scalia Through the Lens of the Magna Carta and the Constitutional Continuum of Liberty" explaining that the Magna Carta demonstrates that the Declaration of Independence is not aspirational philosophy, but a precise legal indictment of the King George III grounded in centuries of English common law.

Legal offices
Preceded by Lyn Stuart	Associate Justice of the Supreme Court of Alabama; 2017–present	Incumbent
