= Benjamin F. Royal =

American politician

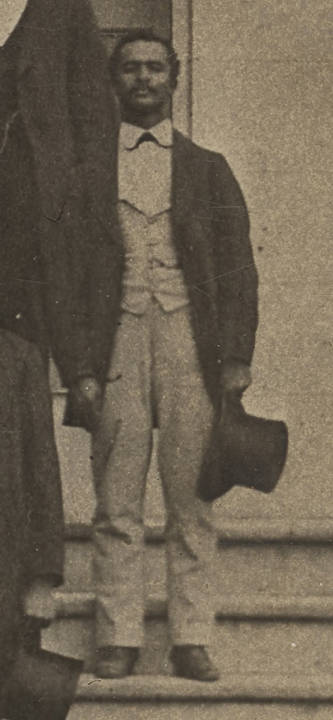

Benjamin F. Royal was a state senator in Alabama during the Reconstruction era. He was elected to the state senate in 1868, and was the first African American to serve in the chamber. He represented Bullock County and served for nine years. He served as a Republican, and had stated that "he could as well be an infidel as to be anything else than a Republican". He was a Union League organizer.

He was born to a white father and a mother who had been a slave. He married a woman named Harriet on February 9, 1868 in Bullock County. The couple had one daughter.

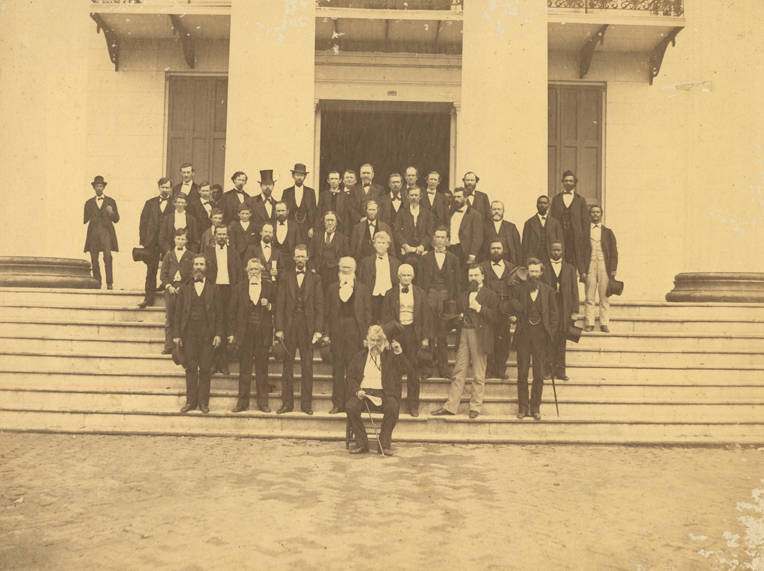
Photo of Alabama Senate members in 1872 on the capitol steps

In 1872, he and other Alabama state senators were photographed on the capitol steps. The photograph is held by the Alabama Department of Archives and History.
