= James Allen Main =

American judge

James Allen Main (born April 8, 1945, in Troy, Alabama) is a former associate justice of the Alabama Supreme Court who was initially appointed on January 14, 2011, by Governor Bob Riley and elected to a six-year term in November, 2012. He did not seek reelection in 2018 and retired from the court in January 2019. Prior to his appointment, he served on the Alabama Court of Criminal Appeals.

== Education ==
Main earned his undergraduate degree in pharmacy from Auburn University and his Juris Doctor from the University of Alabama.

== Career ==
Main currently serves as a justice of the Supreme Court of Alabama, having previously served as a judge on the Alabama Court of Criminal Appeals. He also served as director of finance for the State of Alabama. The finance director is the chief financial officer (CFO) of the state, as well as policy advisor to the governor.

Prior to becoming finance director in 2004, Main served as senior counsel to Governor Bob Riley and chief of staff and legal advisor to Governor Fob James. Other public service includes terms as city attorney for Anniston, Alabama, city judge for Lineville, Alabama, and city attorney for Oxford, Alabama. Main was in private law practice in Anniston (beginning in 1972) and Montgomery, Alabama (beginning in 1989). During Main's 30 plus years of active practice of law, he was counsel in numerous precedent-setting cases before the Alabama Supreme Court and the United States Supreme Court.

Main is a member of a number of professional organizations, including the Alabama Bar Association, where he is a founding Fellow of the Alabama Law Foundation, past president of the American Pharmacists Association, past president of the Alabama Pharmacy Association, past chairman of the Dean's Counsel for the Harrison School of Pharmacy at Auburn University, a past member of the Alabama Commission on Higher Education and a science and technology fellow of the Advanced Science and Technology Adjudication (ASTAR). He is actively involved in his local church and has served as Sunday school teacher, deacon and short-term missionary.

Main has received numerous awards, including the Parke-Davis Leadership Award; the Bowl of Hygeia, the most widely recognized international symbol for the profession of pharmacy today; the Distinguished Alumnus Award from the Harrison School of Pharmacy; the President's Award from the American Society for Pharmacy Law; and member of Alabama Healthcare Hall of Fame Class of 2012. He has long served on various local and state boards and commissions and was named Outstanding Young Man of Anniston in 1975 for his contribution to the community.

Main has been married to Gale for 49 years, is the father of Jay Main, Saxon Main and Ashley Parker and the grandfather of Mary Katherine, Mac, MacLeod, Tom and Walker.
