= Jay Mitchell (judge) =

American judge (born 1976)

Associate Justice of the Alabama Supreme Court
- In office January 11, 2019 – May 19, 2025
- Preceded by: James Allen Main
- Succeeded by: Bill Lewis

Personal details
- Born: James Letcher Mitchell; August 26, 1976 (age 50) Mobile, Alabama, U.S.
- Party: Republican
- Spouse: Elizabeth
- Education: Birmingham–Southern College (BA); University of Virginia (JD)

James Letcher "Jay" Mitchell (born August 26, 1976) is an American lawyer from Alabama who was an associate justice of the Supreme Court of Alabama from 2019 to 2025. His jurisprudence associated him with the Religious right in the United States and Originalism.

Mitchell advocates a textualist interpretation to state and federal law, an Originalist interpretation of the US and state constitutions, rejects separation of church and state, and describes his legal philosophy as being shaped by his Evangelical Christian religious beliefs and the Bible. As with a previous Alabama Supreme Court judge, Roy Moore, Mitchell promotes the public display of the Ten Commandants in government buildings. In a landmark February 2024 case written by Mitchell, the Supreme Court of Alabama recognized frozen embryos created via in vitro fertilization (IVF) as "children" for purposes of Alabama civil and criminal law.

In 2026, Mitchell unsuccessfully ran for Attorney General of Alabama. Much of his campaign was devoted to attacks on Muslims and Islam. Mitchell provoked controversy when he condemned the existence of mosques in Alabama, telling Newsmax TV that "we've got to sound the alarm on this", and warned that Alabama law could eventually be taken over by Islamic Shari'a.

== Early life and education ==
Mitchell was born August 26, 1976, in Mobile, Alabama. He received his Bachelor of Arts with honors from Birmingham–Southern College. He received his J.D. degree from the University of Virginia School of Law.

== Career ==
Prior to serving on the Alabama Supreme Court, Mitchell was a partner with Maynard, Cooper & Gale in Birmingham, Alabama.

=== Alabama Supreme Court ===
On June 5, 2017, Mitchell announced his intent to run for the seat on the Alabama Supreme Court being vacated by James Allen Main. He defeated his Republican rival in the primary and went on to win the general election in November, defeating Democratic candidate Donna Smalley, 60.5%–39.4%.

Mitchell resigned from the Alabama Supreme Court on May 19, 2025. Governor Kay Ivey appointed Bill Lewis to serve the remainder of Mitchell's term the following day.

=== 2026 Alabama Attorney General election ===
On May 19, 2025, Mitchell announced that he would run for attorney general of Alabama in 2026.

== Personal life ==
Mitchell is married to his wife, Elizabeth; they reside in Homewood with their four children. He is a lifelong Republican and a member of the Federalist Society. In June 2025, Mitchell penned an op-ed supporting President Trump's decision to summon the Marines to patrol the streets of Los Angeles in the face of civil unrest.

Legal offices
Preceded by James Allen Main	Associate Justice of the Alabama Supreme Court; 2019–2025	Succeeded by Bill Lewis
