= Tommy Bryan =

American judge (born 1956)

Associate Justice of the Alabama Supreme Court
- Incumbent
- Assumed office January 11, 2013
- Preceded by: Thomas Woodall

Judge of the Alabama Court of Civil Appeals
- In office January 17, 2005 – January 11, 2013
- Preceded by: Sharon Yates
- Succeeded by: Scott Donaldson

Personal details
- Born: Tommy Elias Bryan; May 16, 1956 (age 70)
- Party: Republican
- Education: Troy University (BS, MS); Faulkner University (JD)

Tommy Elias Bryan (born May 16, 1956) is an associate justice of the Supreme Court of Alabama, who was first elected in 2012 and re-elected in 2018. He was previously elected to the Alabama Court of Civil Appeals in 2004 and 2010.

== Education ==
Bryan graduated from Brantley High School in 1974. He received a Bachelor of Science and Master of Science in Education from Troy University. He graduated with a Juris Doctor from Jones School of Law in 1983.

== Career ==
In 1987 Bryan became an assistant attorney general in Alabama. His position was in the Alabama environmental department. In 2005, he was sworn in for his seat as Judge on the Alabama Court of Civil Appeals. In 2010 was reelected for the same seat on the Alabama Court of Civil Appeals. In 2012 he was elected to the Supreme Court of Alabama.

== Personal life ==
Bryan was raised by his parents Elias Daniel Bryan and Margie Spivey Bryan the family farm in Crenshaw County, Alabama.
