= Lyn Stuart =

American judge (born 1955)

32nd Chief Justice of the Alabama Supreme Court
- In office May 6, 2016 – January 11, 2019; Acting: May 6, 2016 – April 26, 2017
- Appointed by: Kay Ivey
- Preceded by: Roy Moore
- Succeeded by: Tom Parker

Personal details
- Born: September 23, 1955 (age 70) Atmore, Alabama, U.S.
- Party: Republican
- Spouse: George Stuart
- Children: 3
- Education: Auburn University (BA); University of Alabama, Tuscaloosa (JD)
- Website: Official website

Jacquelyn L. "Lyn" Stuart (born September 23, 1955) is an American jurist and the first Republican woman Chief Justice of Alabama and the second woman to hold the office. She was first appointed by Alabama Governor Kay Ivey as "acting" Chief Justice of the Supreme Court of Alabama on May 6, 2016, when her predecessor, Roy Moore, was suspended from office. At the time of her initial appointment, she had been an associate justice of the Alabama Supreme Court since 2001, which was the longest tenure for any Republican in the Court's history. She had been thrice elected as an associate justice in 2000, 2006, and 2012.

In September 2016, Moore's suspension was made permanent, and he resigned in April 2017. Upon Moore's actual resignation she was named by Governor Ivey as chief justice on April 26, 2017, without the "acting" title. She sought election to a full six-year term in the Republican Primary on June 5, 2018. However, she lost the Republican nomination for Chief Justice by a relatively narrow 18,826 votes out of more than 514,000 cast. This translated to a percentage 52%-48% loss to Associate Justice Tom Parker.

== Background ==
Born in Atmore, Alabama, she earned her Bachelor of Arts degree in sociology and education from Auburn University in 1977 and her Juris Doctor degree from the University of Alabama School of Law in 1980. She served as secretary of the Student Bar Association, was a member of the John A. Campbell Moot Court Board, and received the Dean's Service Award at graduation. She served as an Alabama Assistant Attorney General under Charles Graddick. In 1988 and 1994 she was elected as a District Court Judge in Baldwin County, Alabama. In January 1997, she was appointed as a Circuit Judge by Governor Fob James and re-elected without opposition in 1998. She resigned as a Circuit Judge upon her election to the Alabama Supreme Court.

Stuart and her husband, George, have two sons and a daughter.

== See also ==
- List of female state supreme court justices

Legal offices
Preceded by Roy Moore	Chief Justice of the Alabama Supreme Court; 2016–2019; Acting: 2016–2017	Succeeded by Tom Parker
