= Glenn Murdock =

American judge

Associate Justice of the Alabama Supreme Court
- In office 2006 – January 16, 2018
- Preceded by: R. Bernard Harwood Jr.
- Succeeded by: Brady E. Mendheim Jr.

Personal details
- Born: June 25, 1956 (age 70) Enterprise, Alabama, U.S.
- Party: Republican
- Education: University of Alabama, Tuscaloosa (BA); University of Virginia (JD)

Glenn Murdock (born June 25, 1956) is a former justice of the Alabama Supreme Court, who was first elected to that court in 2006 and re-elected in 2012. He was previously elected in 2000 to a six-year term on Alabama's Court of Civil Appeals.
