= Alisa Kelli Wise =

American judge (born 1962)

Associate Justice of the Alabama Supreme Court
- Incumbent
- Assumed office January 17, 2011
- Preceded by: Patricia Smith

Personal details
- Born: December 14, 1962 (age 63)
- Party: Republican
- Education: Auburn University (BS); Auburn University at Montgomery (MPA); Faulkner University (JD)

Alisa Kelli Wise (born December 14, 1962) is an American lawyer who has served as an associate justice of the Alabama Supreme Court since 2011.

== Education ==
Wise is a graduate of Auburn University and the Thomas Goode Jones School of Law at Faulkner University in Montgomery, Alabama. She later earned a Master of Public Administration from Auburn University at Montgomery.

== Judicial career ==
She previously served on the Alabama Court of Criminal Appeals, to which she was first elected in 2000. Upon taking office in 2001, she became the youngest woman to ever serve on an Alabama appellate court. Re-elected in 2006, she resigned from the appellate court upon her election to the Alabama Supreme Court. She was first elected as a Republican in 2010 to the Alabama Supreme Court, and re-elected in 2016.

== Personal life ==
She and her husband, retired District Judge Arthur Ray, have one daughter.

== See also ==
- List of female state supreme court justices
