= Chris McCool =

American judge (born 1967 or 1968)

Associate Justice of the Supreme Court of Alabama
- Incumbent
- Assumed office January 24, 2025
- Preceded by: Sarah Hicks Stewart

Personal details
- Born: James Christopher McCool; 1967 or 1968 (age 57–58) Gordo, Alabama, U.S.
- Party: Republican
- Education: University of Alabama (BA, JD)

James Christopher McCool (born 1967 or 1968) is an American lawyer who has served as a justice of the Supreme Court of Alabama since 2025. He previously served as a judge of the Alabama Court of Criminal Appeals from 2018 to 2025.

== Education ==
In 1985, McCool graduated from Pickens Academy as valedictorian. He received a Bachelor of Arts degree summa cum laude from the University of Alabama in 1990, with a double major in history and classics (with a concentration in Greek). He graduated from the University of Alabama School of Law in 1993, where he served on the Honor Court. He was a member of the Alabama Law Review.

== Career ==
After graduating law school, he practiced law with attorney C.O. Burkhalter. In 1995, he was appointed as a full-time assistant district attorney for Pickens County, and in 2001 he became district attorney for the 24th Judicial Circuit. He has also served as a municipal court judge for the municipalities of Reform and Pickensville and as an adjunct professor at the University of Alabama School of Law from 1998 to 2000. In July 2017, McCool announced his candidacy to serve as a judge on the Alabama Court of Criminal Appeals. On November 9, 2018, McCool was sworn in as a judge of the Alabama Court of Criminal Appeals after facing no opposition in the election.

=== Alabama Supreme Court ===
In January 2023, McCool announced his run for a seat on the Supreme Court of Alabama. He would fill the vacancy left by Associate Justice Sarah Hicks Stewart, who ran for the position of chief justice. On November 5, 2024, he went on to win election to the seat, unopposed. He was sworn into office on January 24, 2025.

== Personal life ==
McCool and his wife, Sherri, have been married since Valentine’s Day 1992. They attend Zion Primitive Baptist Church, where McCool has served as a pastor since 2012. Together, they have four children and one grandchild.

== Electoral history ==
2024 Alabama Associate Justice of the Supreme Court, Place 1 election
Party	Candidate	Votes	%
Republican	Chris McCool	1,559,424	97.62
Write-in		37,941	2.38
Total votes		1,597,365	100.00

Legal offices
Preceded by Sarah Hicks Stewart	Associate Justice of the Supreme Court of Alabama; 2025–present	Incumbent
