= Sarah Hicks Stewart =

American judge (born 1963)

Chief Justice of the Alabama Supreme Court
- Incumbent
- Assumed office January 24, 2025
- Preceded by: Tom Parker

Associate Justice of the Alabama Supreme Court
- In office January 11, 2019 – January 24, 2025
- Preceded by: Brady E. Mendheim Jr.
- Succeeded by: Chris McCool

Personal details
- Born: April 26, 1963 (age 63) Fort Smith, Arkansas, U.S.
- Party: Republican
- Education: University of Arkansas (BA, MA); Vanderbilt University (JD)

Sarah Hicks Stewart (born April 26, 1963) is an American lawyer who has served as the chief justice of the Supreme Court of Alabama since 2025, after being elected in November 2024. She served as an associate justice of the same court from 2019 to 2025.

== Education ==
Stewart received both a Bachelor of Arts and Master of Arts in communications from the University of Arkansas. She went on to receive a Juris Doctor from Vanderbilt University Law School.

== Career ==
She worked as a private practice attorney from 1992 until her judicial appointment; from 1996 to 2006 she was a senior partner.

=== Alabama Supreme Court ===
In 2017 Stewart announced her candidacy for the Supreme Court for the seat being vacated by Glenn Murdock, who was not seeking reelection. In the primary, she faced incumbent Brady E. Mendheim Jr. who was appointed by the governor, along with another challenger. Mendheim conceded his loss to Stewart. Stewart went on to win the general election, facing no challenger. She was sworn into office on January 11, 2019. In January 2023, Stewart announced she was running for the position of chief justice to replace Chief Justice Tom Parker when he retires. She went on to win the Republican primary. Stewart won the general election held on November 5, 2024. She was sworn into office on January 24, 2025.

== Personal life ==
Stewart is married to her husband Craig R. Stewart, and they have two daughters.

== See also ==
- List of female state supreme court justices

Legal offices
Preceded by Brady E. Mendheim Jr.	Associate Justice of the Alabama Supreme Court; 2019–2025	Succeeded by Chris McCool
Preceded by Tom Parker	Chief Justice of the Alabama Supreme Court; 2025–present	Incumbent
