= Brad Mendheim =

American judge (born 1968)

Brady Mendheim

Associate Justice of the Alabama Supreme Court
- Incumbent
- Assumed office January 15, 2019
- Appointed by: Kay Ivey
- Preceded by: Tom Parker
- In office January 23, 2018 – January 11, 2019
- Appointed by: Kay Ivey
- Preceded by: Glenn Murdock
- Succeeded by: Sarah Hicks Stewart

Personal details
- Born: July 26, 1968 (age 58)
- Party: Republican
- Education: Auburn University (BA); Samford University (JD)

Brady Eutaw Mendheim Jr. (born July 26, 1968) is an American jurist who has served as an associate justice of the Supreme Court of Alabama since 2019.

== Biography ==
Mendheim earned his Bachelor of Arts from Auburn University and his Juris Doctor from Cumberland School of Law. In law school, he was a member of the law review American Journal of Trial Advocacy and also served as a legal-research and writing instructor to first-year law students.

Before becoming a judge in 2001, he was an assistant district attorney for the 20th Judicial Circuit for almost seven years. During that time he served on the board of directors of the Southeast Alabama Child Advocacy Center. Before becoming an assistant district attorney, he worked with a general-practice law firm in Dothan with a focus on defense in civil litigation.

He served as a circuit judge for the 20th Judicial Circuit, a position he had held since 2009. From 2001 until 2009, he served as a district judge in Houston County. From 2001 until his appointment as an Associate Justice, he was appointed specially by various Chief Justices to preside over more than 250 cases in more than 40 Alabama counties.

== Service on Supreme Court ==
Mendheim was appointed to the Supreme Court of Alabama on January 19, 2018, by Governor Kay Ivey to replace Justice Glenn Murdock who resigned. He took office on January 23, 2018 Justice Mendheim was defeated for nomination for a full term in the June, 2018 Republican Primary by Circuit Judge Sarah Hicks Stewart.

On December 28, 2018, Mendheim was once again appointed to the Supreme Court, this time for the seat being vacated by Tom Parker who would become chief justice.

== Personal life ==
Mendheim's parents are the late Brady and Nancy Mendheim. He and his wife, Michelle, who is from Piedmont, Alabama, have been married for more than 23 years, and they have 3 sons.

Legal offices
Preceded by Glenn Murdock	Associate Justice of the Supreme Court of Alabama; 2018–2019	Succeeded by Sarah Hicks Stewart
Preceded by Tom Parker	Associate Justice of the Supreme Court of Alabama; 2019–present	Incumbent
