= Tom Parker (judge) =

American judge (born 1951)

Chief Justice of the Alabama Supreme Court
- In office January 11, 2019 – January 24, 2025
- Preceded by: Lyn Stuart
- Succeeded by: Sarah Hicks Stewart

Associate Justice of the Alabama Supreme Court
- In office January 14, 2005 – January 11, 2019
- Preceded by: Jean Brown
- Succeeded by: Brady E. Mendheim Jr.

Personal details
- Born: August 19, 1951 (age 74) Montgomery, Alabama, U.S.
- Party: Republican
- Education: Dartmouth College (BA); Vanderbilt University (JD)

Tom Parker (born August 19, 1951) is an American lawyer who served as the chief justice of the Alabama Supreme Court from 2019 to 2025. He previously served as an associate justice on the court having been elected to that position in 2004 and re-elected in 2010.

== Early life and education ==
Parker was born and raised in Montgomery, Alabama. His family was middle-class. He attended Sidney Lanier High School, where he was elected as student body president. Afterwards, Parker was educated at Dartmouth College and initially intended to be a historian. He graduated cum laude from Dartmouth, and then attended Vanderbilt University Law School, where he received his Juris Doctor degree. He studied at the Law School of the University of São Paulo in Brazil as a Rotary International fellow.

== Career ==
In 1989, Parker became the founding executive director of the Alabama Family Alliance (later renamed the Alabama Policy Institute), a conservative think tank. At other points in his career, Parker was an Alabama assistant attorney general, deputy administrative director of Alabama courts, general counsel for Alabama trial courts, and director of the Alabama Judicial College. He had been an assistant attorney general under Jeff Sessions, who became United States Attorney General under President Donald Trump, and Bill Pryor, now the Presiding Judge of the U.S. Court of Appeals for the Eleventh Circuit.

Parker defeated incumbent Jean Brown in the Republican primary and Robert H. Smith in the general election to become an associate justice on the Alabama Supreme Court in 2004 and was sworn in on January 14, 2005. He was re-elected in 2010. In 2016, Parker successfully sought a third term as associate justice.

On June 5, 2018, Parker won the Republican nomination for Chief Justice over incumbent Chief Justice Lyn Stuart, although seven current and former Alabama Supreme Court justices publicly supported Stuart over Parker in the primary, two of whom—despite being Republicans—would contribute to Parker's Democratic opponent in the general election. Parker went on to defeat the Democratic nominee, Circuit Judge Bob Vance, in the general election on November 6, 2018. The campaign was marked by negative television advertising in which Parker's campaign ran ads accusing Vance (who was supported by a moderate coalition) of being backed by "leftist billionaires" and in which Vance's campaign ran ads saying that Parker was "another Roy Moore" who would bring more "chaos and controversy" to Alabama. It was also notable for the significant support Parker received from the trial lawyers via the Progress for Justice PAC.

Parker was sworn in as Chief Justice of Alabama on January 11, 2019. He currently sits on the Board of Jurists at the Blackstone and Burke Center for Law and Liberty, at Faulkner University. On Indigenous Peoples' Day in 2022 Parker sent a letter of apology to the Echota Cherokee Tribe on behalf of the past actions against their people during the times of removal.

As Chief Justice, Parker sat on every case that came before the two divisions of the Court. He worked with the legislative and executive branches to restore court personnel positions lost during proration, increase funding for the judiciary, and obtain the creation of the first new judgeships since 2007. On January 20, 2025, Parker became the first Alabama chief justice to complete a full six year term since Sonny Hornsby left the office in 1995.

== Controversies ==
=== Alleged support of white supremacist groups ===
As a candidate in 2004, he was criticized by the Southern Poverty Law Center for distributing Confederate flags at a funeral of the last Confederate widow. Parker was photographed at the funeral standing between Leonard Wilson, a board member of the Council of Conservative Citizens, and Mike Whorton, a leader with the League of the South. He denied being a member of either group and said he did not consider his actions in either event inappropriate for a judicial candidate. Parker was also criticized for attending a party in Selma commemorating the birthday of Confederate Gen. Nathan Bedford Forrest, founder of the Ku Klux Klan. The party was hosted at "Fort Dixie" by Pat and Butch Godwin, operator of Friends of Forrest Inc. and also involved with the League of the South.

=== Editorial criticizing fellow justices ===
In 2006, Parker wrote an op-ed, published in The Birmingham News, in which he criticized his colleagues on the state supreme court for a ruling the previous year in which the court reversed a death sentence for a 17-year-old convicted of murder, following the U.S. Supreme Court's decision in Roper v. Simmons. Parker had represented the State in the conviction and therefore recused from the appeal before the Alabama Supreme Court. In the op-ed, Parker criticized the Roper decision as "blatant judicial tyranny" and asserted that "State supreme courts may decline to follow bad U.S. Supreme Court precedents because those decisions bind only the parties to the particular case." He noted that in numerous cases the U.S. Supreme Court had reversed its prior decisions after state supreme courts had differed with Supreme Court precedent. The claim was criticized by legal experts (as well as Alabama Chief Justice Drayton Nabers Jr., whom Parker was then running against) because it contravenes the accepted principle of American jurisprudence that the U.S. Supreme Court has ultimate authority on matters of federal law. Retired U.S. Supreme Court Justice Sandra Day O'Connor criticized Parker's op-ed in a Wall Street Journal commentary, writing that it was an inappropriate attack on fellow judges and was at odds with the Constitution's Supremacy Clause.

=== Criticized for low productivity as an associate justice ===
Justice Tom Woodall, then running for his second term as an associate supreme court justice, criticized Parker as a candidate for chief justice in 2006. Woodhall characterized Parker's views as extreme, called Parker's op-ed criticizing his colleagues "cowardly and deceitful" and said that Parker "doesn't handle his cases; he just lets them pile up." Parker had the lowest productivity compared to the state's other new justices, writing only one opinion in his first fifteen months compared to 38 by Mike Bolin and 28 by Patricia Smith. Parker attributed slowness to the fact that he had no experience as a judge and because he had to hire new staff members.

== Positions ==
A longtime ally and former aide of Roy Moore, whose candidacy for United States Senate was derailed following multiple allegations of romantically pursuing teenagers while an adult, he is known for his conservative views. He strongly opposed Roe v. Wade (1973), calling it a "constitutional aberration", and has written a number of anti-abortion judicial opinions. Parker was among the majority of the Alabama Supreme Court justices in 2015 that blocked probate judges from issuing same-sex marriage licenses, and he has criticized the U.S. Supreme Court decision in Obergefell v. Hodges (2015).

Parker in March 2022 participated in the New Apostolic Reformation's prayer phone call, where Parker said that "as chief justice, I can help prepare the soil of the hearts, exposing the judges around the state to the things of God", and also commented that "righteousness and faithfulness are the products" of "restored" judges, citing Isaiah 1:26.

Critics see his positions as guided by his religion rather than the law.

Parker in February 2024 espoused the Seven Mountain Mandate that conservative Christians should hold dominion over the seven major aspects of life: family, religion, education, media, entertainment, business, and government. The "foundation" of the "original form of government" of the United States was the Bible, said Parker, and this was "constitutional". He further opined that "God created government, and the fact that we have let it go into the possession of others, it’s heartbreaking".

== Notable cases ==
The Alabama Supreme Court ruled in February 2024 that frozen embryos are "extrauterine children" and thus legally children in the state of Alabama whom lawsuits alleging wrongful death could be filed over. Parker wrote a concurring opinion discussing the word "sanctity" in the Alabama Constitution provision on "the sanctity of life," a theologically based term that "God made every person in His image" and that "human life cannot be wrongfully destroyed without incurring the wrath of a holy God, who views the destruction of His image as an affront to Himself". Parker went on to say that, "even before birth, all human beings bear the image of God, and their lives cannot be destroyed without effacing his glory". In his opinion, Parker cited the Bible's Book of Jeremiah and Book of Genesis, the Sixth Commandment, the Manhattan Declaration, and Christian theologians such as Thomas Aquinas and John Calvin. Shortly following the Court's ruling, Alabama's largest hospital stopped all in vitro fertilization (IVF) services.

== Personal life ==
Parker lives in Montgomery County and is married.

Legal offices
| Preceded by Lyn Stuart | Chief Justice of the Alabama Supreme Court; 2019–2025 | Succeeded by Sarah Hicks Stewart |
