= Alabama Court of Criminal Appeals =

Appeals court in Montgomery, Alabama

The Alabama Court of Criminal Appeals is one of two appellate courts in the Alabama judicial system. The court was established in 1969 when what had been one unitary state Court of Appeals was broken into a criminal appeals court and a civil appeals court. The unitary Court of Appeals had been operative since 1911. The Court of Criminal Appeals is the linear descendant of the unitary Court of Appeals as its predecessor judges were automatically assigned to the Court of Criminal Appeals in 1969. At that time the court only had three judges, but that was changed to five in 1971. The court is housed in the Heflin-Torbert Judicial Building in downtown Montgomery, Alabama.

The court is composed of five judges elected in partisan elections, one of whom is elected by members of the court to serve as presiding judge. The Court of Criminal Appeals hears all appeals of felony and misdemeanor cases, including violations of city ordinances and all post-conviction writs in criminal cases.

The Clerk of the Court is D. Scott Mitchell.

== Overview ==
The Court of Criminal Appeals hears appeals on cases that have been decided at the Circuit Court level (of which there are 40 in the state). The five judges that sit on the Court of Criminal Appeals hear all criminal appeals including felony cases, convictions involving misdemeanors, and violations of multiple ordinances.

=== Election of judges ===
Judges are usually elected to the court in statewide partisan elections for six-year terms on the court. However, the Governor has the power to fill court vacancies when they occur, usually due to death, resignation, or elevation to a higher court by one of its members.

The first woman to serve on the Court, Annie Lola Price was appointed on January 12, 1951, by Governor James "Big Jim" Folsom to a vacancy in the final week of his first term as governor. She also holds the distinction of being the first female judge at any level in the history of Alabama. She remained on the court until her death in 1972. The youngest member of the court was Judge William M. Bowen, Jr., who assumed office on January 18, 1977, at the age of 29 following his election. He became the youngest appellate court judge in the nation at that time. He served until 1983 and again from 1988 to 1995. Two of the more recent members of the court were initially appointed by Governors as well. Michael Joiner, the Presiding Circuit Judge in Shelby County was appointed to the court on February 7, 2011, by Governor Robert J. Bentley, to fill the remainder of the term of James Allen Main. Justice Main was appointed to the Alabama Supreme Court by Governor Bob Riley in January, 2011. Judge Joiner was elected to the remainder of that term on November 6, 2012.

The membership of the Court was all Democrat from 1969 until 1994 with the election of Republican Frank Long, who served one six-year term. The first Republican re-elected to the court was H. W. "Bucky" McMillan who initially served as a Democrat beginning in 1985. He switched to the GOP prior to his re-election in 1996 and retired from the court in 2007.

District Attorney Chris McCool was appointed on November 9, 2018, to the vacancy created by the resignation of Liles C. Burke, who still had 2 1/2 months remaining on his term. Judge Burke had resigned from the court following his confirmation to a Federal District Judgeship on October 11, 2018. Due to his then pending U.S. Senate confirmation, Judge Burke did not seek renomination to his seat in the June 2018 Republican primary. Chris McCool ran in the GOP primary for that seat and won a full six-year term with the election on November 6, 2018.

=== Qualifications ===
To serve on the court, a person must:

- Be licensed to practice law in the state of Alabama
- Have resided in the state for a minimum of one year
- Be no more than 70 years of age at time of appointment or election.

== Judges ==
=== Current ===
Name	Start	Term Ends	Party	Law School
Mary Becker Windom, Presiding Judge	2008	2027	Republican	Faulkner
Richard Minor	2018	2031	Republican	Cumberland
Beth Kellum	2008	2027	Republican	Alabama
Richard Anderson	2024	2031	Republican	Washington and Lee
Bill Cole	2018	2031	Republican	Alabama

=== Former ===
- Henry Ward "Bucky" McMillan (R)
- Sue Bell Cobb (D)
- Francis A. "Frank" Long, Sr. (R)
- Greg Shaw (R)
- Pamela Willis Baschab (R)
- Jean Brown (R)
- James Allen Main (R)
- Kelli Wise (R)
- James H. Fry (D)
- Mark Montiel (R)
- Sam W. Taylor (D)
- William M. Bowen, Jr. (D)
- John M. Patterson (D)
- Aubrey M. Cates, Jr. (D)
- John Paul DeCarlo (D)
- Reneau P. Almon (D)
- Annie Lola Price (D)
- John C. Tyson (D)
- John O. Harris (D)
- Liles C. Burke (R)
- Samuel Henry Welch (R) (2007-2019)
- Michael Joiner (R) (2012-2019)
- Chris McCool (R) (2018-2025)

== See also ==
- Alabama Supreme Court
- Alabama Court of Civil Appeals
