= Supreme Court of Alabama =

Highest court in the U.S. state of Alabama

- Seal
- Interactive map of Supreme Court of Alabama
- 32.3768°N 86.3043°W
- Established: 1819
- Jurisdiction: Alabama
- Location: Heflin-Torbert Judicial Building, Montgomery, Alabama
- Coordinates: 32.3768°N 86.3043°W
- Composition method: Partisan election
- Authorised by: Alabama Constitution
- Appeals to: Supreme Court of the United States (questions of federal or constitutional law only)
- Judge term length: 6 years
- Number of positions: 9
- Website: Official website

Chief Justice
- Currently: Sarah Hicks Stewart
- Since: January 24, 2025

The Supreme Court of Alabama is the highest court in the state of Alabama. The court consists of a chief justice and eight associate justices. Each justice is elected in partisan elections for staggered six-year terms. The Supreme Court is housed in the Heflin-Torbert Judicial Building in downtown Montgomery, Alabama.

The Governor of Alabama may fill vacancies when they occur for the remainder of unexpired terms. The current line-up for the court is all Republican. There is no specific limitation on the number of terms to which a member may be elected. However, the state constitution under Amendment 328, adopted in 1973, prohibits any member from seeking election once they reach age 70.

The Clerk of Court is Margaret "Megan" Byrne Rhodebeck, who assumed the office by appointment on August 1, 2022.

== History ==
The Supreme Court of Alabama was organized under the governorship of William Wyatt Bibb, and had its beginnings with the Alabama Constitution of 1819, which stated that until the General Assembly deemed otherwise, the functions of the Supreme Court would be handled by the judges of the Alabama circuit courts. The circuit judges were elected by a joint vote of both houses of the Alabama Legislature. These judges met in May 1820 in the capital city of Cahaba for the first term of the Supreme Court. Clement Comer Clay was appointed by the other judges as the first chief justice of the court. Following his resignation in 1823, he was succeeded by Abner Smith Lipscomb.

The court was then reorganized in 1832. It then became a separate court with three justices elected to six-year terms. Abner Lipscomb remained as chief justice. In 1851 the number of justices was increased to five. In 1853 the membership of the court was reduced to three again. By this time the court had its own chambers in the newly completed Alabama State Capitol. No changes to the court occurred during the years of the Civil War.

The new state constitution of 1868, drafted during the Reconstruction Era, committed the election of the three justices to the people rather than the legislature. The number of justices was increased to four in 1889. In 1891, the number increased to five. Following the adoption of the 1901 constitution, the 1903 session of the legislature raised the number of justices to seven. In 1940 the Supreme Court moved from the Capitol Building to 445 Dexter Avenue. The building had been built as a Scottish Rite temple in 1926 but was sold to the state during the financially difficult years of the Great Depression. The state acquired and started a remodel of the building in 1938 for the relocation of the Judicial Department, Attorney General and State Law Library.

Legislative Act Number 602, 1969 Alabama Acts was passed during Regular Session of 1969. It increased the number of associate justices to eight, bringing the number of court justices to the configuration that remains today. Former Justice Janie L. Shores was the first of six women to serve on the court. She was elected to the court in 1974. The first of three black justices to serve on the court was former Justice Oscar W. Adams Jr., who in 1980 was initially appointed by then Governor Fob James to serve the remainder of an unexpired term. Justice Adams became the first black justice elected to the court when he was elected two years later to serve a full six-year term. The court moved to the new Heflin-Torbert Judicial Building at 300 Dexter Avenue in 1994. In 2022 the Supreme Court of Alabama Chief Justice Tom Parker Issued a letter of apology on behalf of the State of Alabama to the Echota Cherokee Tribe of Alabama.

== Jurisdiction ==
The Supreme Court of Alabama has the authority to review decisions by all the lower courts of the state and the authority to determine certain legal matters over which no other court has jurisdiction. It further has the authority to issue any necessary orders to carry out the general superintendence of the Unified Judicial System of Alabama. It has exclusive jurisdiction over all appeals in disputes exceeding $50,000, as well as appeals from the Alabama Public Service Commission.

The chief justice also serves as the administrative head of the Alabama Judicial System. The court makes all rules governing administration, practice, and procedure for all Alabama courts. The exercise of this authority eliminates technicalities which usually cause delays in trial courts and reversals in appellate courts.

== Chief Justices ==
The Alabama Supreme Court has had an unusually high turnover in the chief justice position, going back to October 1995. Since then, the post has been occupied by eight different individuals for nine different time periods. Not one of these individuals has completed an entire term of six years.

Perry Hooper Sr., elected in 1994, did not assume the office until October, 1995, after a protracted election contest that prevented him from taking office until nine months into the term. He was succeeded by Roy Moore, who was elected in 2000 but removed from office due to violations of the judicial canon of ethics. Associate Justice Gorman Houston acted as temporary chief justice during Moore's suspension but before his actual removal from office. After Moore vacated the office, the Governor appointed Drayton Nabers Jr. Sue Bell Cobb defeated Chief Justice Nabers in 2006. Cobb resigned for personal reasons in the middle of her term. Her replacement, Chuck Malone was appointed on August 1, 2011, by Governor Robert Bentley but was defeated for re-nomination by former Chief Justice Roy Moore in 2012.

Moore assumed the office a second time beginning in January 2013, and was again suspended from office on May 6, 2016, by the Court of the Judiciary. Associate Justice Lyn Stuart became chief justice on April 26, 2017, when Moore formally resigned from the seat from which he was already suspended. Moore then sought election to the U.S. Senate seat vacated by Jeff Sessions for which a special election was held in December 2017. Stuart was appointed for the remainder of the term by Governor Kay Ivey on April 26, 2017. Chief Justice Stuart, who became the first female Republican chief justice, has been an associate justice of the court since 2001. She faced Associate Justice Tom Parker in the GOP primary in June 2018, and lost the primary to Parker in a relatively close race. Parker had previously lost a GOP primary for the post to Drayton Nabers in 2006.

When Tom Parker was elected as chief justice in 2018, he vacated the associate justice seat he then held and Governor Kay Ivey appointed outgoing Justice Mendheim to the seat. He was succeeded by Justice Sarah Hicks Stewart in 2025, after she was elected by voters in November 2024.

List of all chief justices of Alabama Supreme Court:

1. Clement Claiborne Clay
2. Abner Smith Lipscomb
3. Reuben Saffold
4. Henry Hitchcock (D)
5. Arthur F. Hopkins (D)
6. Henry W. Collier (D)
7. Edmund S. Dargan (D)
8. William P. Chilton (D)
9. George Goldthwaite (D)
10. Samuel F. Rice (D)
11. Abram J. Walker (D)
12. Elisha W. Peck (R)
13. Thomas Minott Peters (R)
14. Robert C. Brickell (D)
15. George W. Stone (D)
16. Robert C. Brickell (D) (re-elected)
17. Samuel D. Weakley Jr. (D)
18. John R. Tyson (D)
19. James R. Dowdell (D)
20. John C. Anderson (D)
21. Lucien D. Gardner (D)
22. J. Ed Livingston (D)
23. Howell Heflin (D)
24. C.C. Torbert (D) (1977-1989)
25. Ernest C. Hornsby (D) (1989-1995)
26. Perry O. Hooper Sr. (R) (1995–2001)
27. Roy Moore (R) (2001–2003)
28. Gorman Houston (R) (acting 2003–2004)
29. Drayton Nabers Jr. (R) (2004–2007)
30. Sue Bell Cobb (D) (2007–2011)
31. Chuck Malone (R) (2011–2013)
32. Roy Moore (R) (2013–2017)
33. Lyn Stuart (R) (acting 2016–2017; appointed 2017–2019)
34. Tom Parker (R) (2019–2025)
35. Sarah Hicks Stewart (R) (2025–present)

== Current Justices ==
Most of the current members of the court initially came to their seats via election, with two exceptions:

- Justice Lyn Stuart's elevation to the chief justice position created a vacancy in the associate justice seat she held. That vacancy was filled by Governor Kay Ivey on May 25, 2017, with the appointment of Justice William B. Sellers.
- Justice Tom Parker became chief justice on January 14, 2019, vacating the associate justice seat he held. On December 28, 2018, Governor Ivey appointed outgoing Justice Brady E. Mendheim Jr. to that seat, effective January 15, 2019. Mendheim had previously been appointed by Ivey to replace Justice Glenn Murdock, who resigned effective January 2018; Mendheim was defeated in the election to serve the remainder of that term.

| Seat | Name | Born | Start | Term ends | Party | Appointer | Law School |
|---|---|---|---|---|---|---|---|
| Chief Justice | Sarah Hicks Stewart | April 26, 1963 (age 63) | January 11, 2019 (Note: Took office as Chief Justice on January 24, 2025.) | 2030 | Republican | —N/a (Note: Took office after being elected in a partisan election.) | Vanderbilt |
| 7 | Greg Shaw | March 21, 1957 (age 69) | January 20, 2009 | 2032 | Republican | —N/a | Samford |
| 6 | Alisa Kelli Wise | December 14, 1962 (age 63) | January 17, 2011 | 2028 | Republican | —N/a | Faulkner |
| 2 | Tommy Bryan | May 16, 1956 (age 70) | January 11, 2013 | 2030 | Republican | —N/a | Faulkner |
| 3 | Will Sellers | February 10, 1963 (age 63) | May 25, 2017 | 2030 | Republican | Kay Ivey (R) | Alabama |
| 8 | Brady E. Mendheim Jr. | July 26, 1968 (age 58) | January 15, 2019 (Note: Previously appointed by Governor Ivey from January 23, 2018 – January 11, 2019. Reappointed to a different seat and took office on January 15, 2019.) | 2032 | Republican | Kay Ivey (R) | Samford |
| 5 | Greg Cook | 1962 or 1963 (age 63–64) | January 17, 2023 | 2028 | Republican | —N/a | Harvard |
| 1 | Chris McCool | 1967 or 1968 (age 58–59) | January 24, 2025 | 2030 | Republican | —N/a | Alabama |
| 4 | Will Parker | | November 10, 2025 | 2032 | Republican | Kay Ivey (R) | Alabama |

=== Vacancy and pending nomination ===
| Vacator | Reason | Vacancy Date | Nominee | Nomination Date |
|---|---|---|---|---|
| Greg Cook | Elevation | TBD | Pending | TBD |

== Administrative Office of the Courts and State Marshals ==
The Administrative Office of the Courts is under the leadership of a director appointed by the chief justice of the Court. The Administrative Office of the Courts is responsible for a variety of functions including but not limited to the Juvenile Probation Offices for the Family Court System, Child Support Enforcement, Human Resources Division of the Court, and the Court Interpreter Registry. The current director, Rich Hobson, was appointed by Chief Justice Tom Parker to the position in January, 2019. This is Hobson's third time in the position having previously served in the post from 2001 to 2003 and from 2013 to 2016.

The State of Alabama marshals are responsible for protection of the Supreme Court, Court of Criminal Appeals, and the Court of Civil Appeals. They also serve subpoenas and court documents among other duties. The current marshal of the Alabama Appellate Courts is Earl Marsh, who was appointed in 2020.

== Notable rulings ==
In February 2024, the Alabama Supreme Court ruled in LePage v. Center for Reproductive Medicine that frozen embryos were "extrauterine children" and thus were legally children in the State of Alabama. In a concurring opinion, Chief Justice Tom Parker discussed the issue "theologically", writing that "human life cannot be wrongfully destroyed without incurring the wrath of a holy God", as "even before birth, all human beings bear the image of God, and their lives cannot be destroyed without effacing his glory". The court's ruling has led three major Alabama medical providers to discontinue in-vitro fertilisation treatment because of legal uncertainty created by the decision. The ruling was described by the U.S. President Joe Biden as "outrageous and unacceptable". Former President Trump said he “strongly supports the availability of IVF" and called on lawmakers in Alabama to preserve access to IVF.

== See also ==
- Courts of Alabama
- Alabama Court of Civil Appeals
- Alabama Court of Criminal Appeals
