= Randy Kelley =

American politician

Chair of the Alabama Democratic Party
- In office August 13, 2022 – August 8, 2026
- Preceded by: Christopher J. England
- Succeeded by: Bobby Singleton

Personal details
- Party: Democratic
- Education: Jacksonville State University (BS); Interdenominational Theological Center (MDiv, DMin)

Randy B. Kelley is an American politician who has served as the chair of the Alabama Democratic Party (ADP) from 2022 to 2026. He also served as the vice chair for the ADP from 2016 until his removal in 2019.

== Education ==
Kelley attended Jacksonville State University, where he received a Bachelor of Science in Sociology and Psychology. He also attended Gammon Theological Seminary, where he received a master's degree, as well as a doctorate from the Interdenominational Theological Center.

== Career ==
=== Alabama Democratic Party ===
He was elected to succeed Redding Pitt as vice chair of the Alabama Democratic Party in 2016, the same year that he was chosen as an elector to represent Hillary Clinton for the state of Alabama in the 2016 United States presidential election. He was subsequently re-elected alongside ADP chair Nancy Worley in 2018. At a November 2, 2019 meeting, he and Worley were removed from their positions in a unanimous vote by the State Democratic Executive Committee, where he was succeeded by Patricia Todd.

==== Chairmanship (2022–2026) ====
Kelley was endorsed by Joe L. Reed in his 2022 run for chair of the ADP. He defeated Tabitha Isner on August 13, 2022, to become the next party chair. Isner was later elected as vice chair in the same meeting. At a meeting in July 2023, Kelley stated that no one in attendance was allowed to record the meeting. Isner objected to this, stating that state law allows for one-party consent in regard to digital recording. Kelley then interrupted her, shouting, "you be quiet, girl."

He has been part of a long-running feud involving former U.S. Senator Doug Jones and state party leaders such as Kelley and Reed. In August 2024, Kelley claimed that Jones orchestrated a "plot to prevent Blacks from electing delegates of their choosing to the DNC." The claims came after several delegates were denied entry into the convention. Jones stated that while he was not part of the initial decisions to deny delegates, he was involved with the process of selecting replacements.

In March 2025, Kelley alleged that Jones was soliciting donations on behalf of the state party. Jones denied the allegations and threatened legal action against Kelley in the form of a defamation lawsuit. Despite initially claiming that he would not retract his statements, Kelley issued a retraction less than a week following the threats.

In August 2026, Kelley was defeated for re-election in as ADP chairman by Bobby Singleton.

Party political offices
| Preceded by Christopher J. England | Chair of the Alabama Democratic Party; 2022–2026 | Succeeded by Bobby Singleton |
