= 2018 Alabama Amendment 1 =

2018 ballot measure in Alabama

Alabama Amendment 1
- November 6, 2018
- Proposing an amendment to the Constitution of Alabama of 1901, providing for certain religious rights and liberties; authorizing the display of the Ten Commandments on state property and property owned or administrated by a public school or public body; and prohibiting the expenditure of public funds in defense of the constitutionality of this amendment.

Results
Choice	Votes	%
Yes	1,094,677	71.65%
No	433,133	28.35%
Valid votes	1,527,810	100.00%
Invalid or blank votes	0	0.00%
Total votes	1,527,810	100.00%
Yes
50–60%
60–70%
70–80%
80–90%
90–100%
No
50–60%

The Ten Commandments Amendment, also known as Amendment 1, was a legislatively referred constitutional amendment that appeared on the ballot in the U.S. state of Alabama on November 6, 2018. The measure amended the Constitution of Alabama to permit the display of the Ten Commandments on public property, including public schools. It was approved by 72% of voters.

Amendment 1 did not require public schools and property to display the Ten Commandments, instead authorizing them by law. A bill was proposed in April 2025 to require the Ten Commandments to be displayed in schools, but did not receive a final vote in the Alabama Senate. In 2026, a bill passed.

== Text ==
Amendment 1 proposed the following addition to the Constitution of Alabama:

Every person shall be at liberty to worship God according to the dictates of his or her own conscience. No person shall be compelled to attend, or, against his or her consent, to contribute to the erection or support of any place of religious worship, or to pay tithes, taxes, or other rates for the support of any minister of the gospel. Property belonging to the state may be used to display the Ten Commandments, and the right of a public school and public body to display the Ten Commandments on property owned or administrated by a public school or public body in this state is not restrained or abridged. The civil and political rights, privileges, and capacities of no person shall be diminished or enlarged on account of his or her religious belief. No public funds may be expended in defense of the constitutionality of this amendment.

The Ten Commandments shall be displayed in a manner that complies with constitutional requirements, including, but not limited to, being intermingled with historical or educational items, or both, in a larger display within or on property owned or administrated by a public school or public body.

== Endorsements ==
Yes

State senators

- Gerald Dial, state senator from the 13th district (2010–2018, 1983–2006) and state representative from the 60th district (1974–1982) (Republican)

Local officials

- Tommy Battle, mayor of Huntsville (2008–present) and candidate for governor in 2018 (Republican)
- Scott Dawson, evangelist and candidate for governor in 2018 (Republican)

Organizations

- Alabama Republican Party
No

State representatives

- Marcel Black, state representative from the 3rd district (1994–2018) and 2nd district (1990–1994) (Democratic)
- Mary Moore, state representative from the 56th district (2002–present) (Democratic)

Newspapers and other media

- The Anniston Star

Organizations

- American Civil Liberties Union

== Results ==
Alabama Amendment 1
Choice	Votes	%
For	1,094,677	71.65
Against	433,133	28.35
Total	1,527,810	100.00
