= 2018 Alabama gubernatorial election =

- November 6, 2018
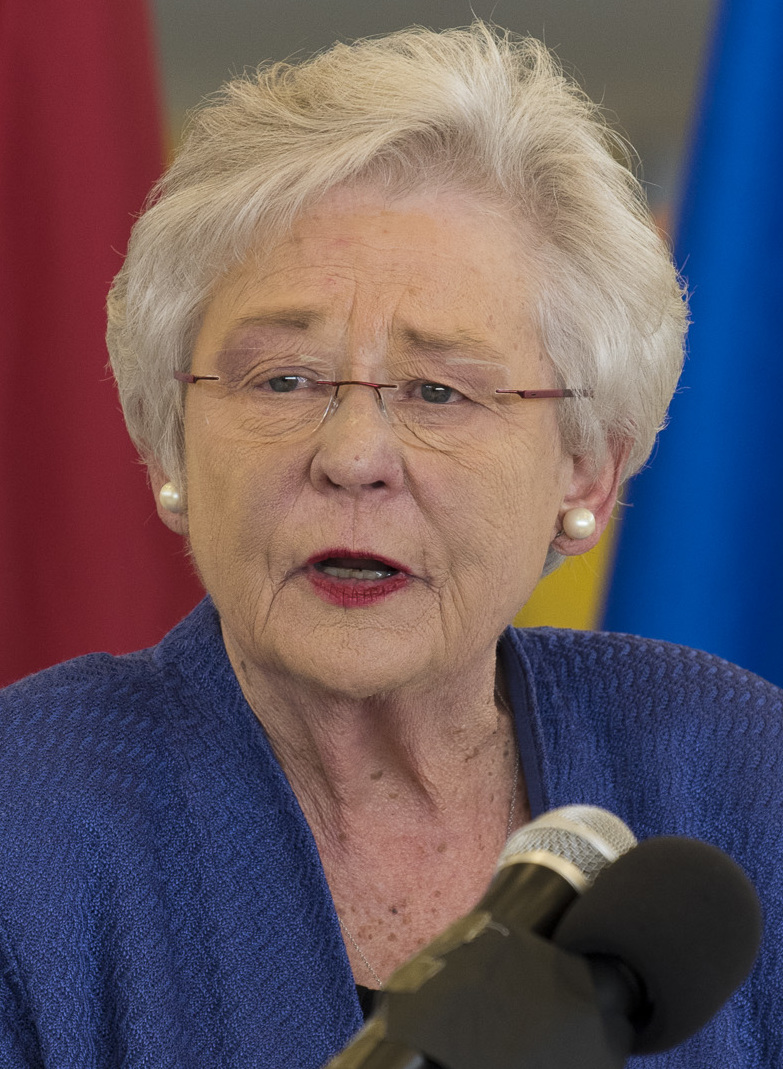

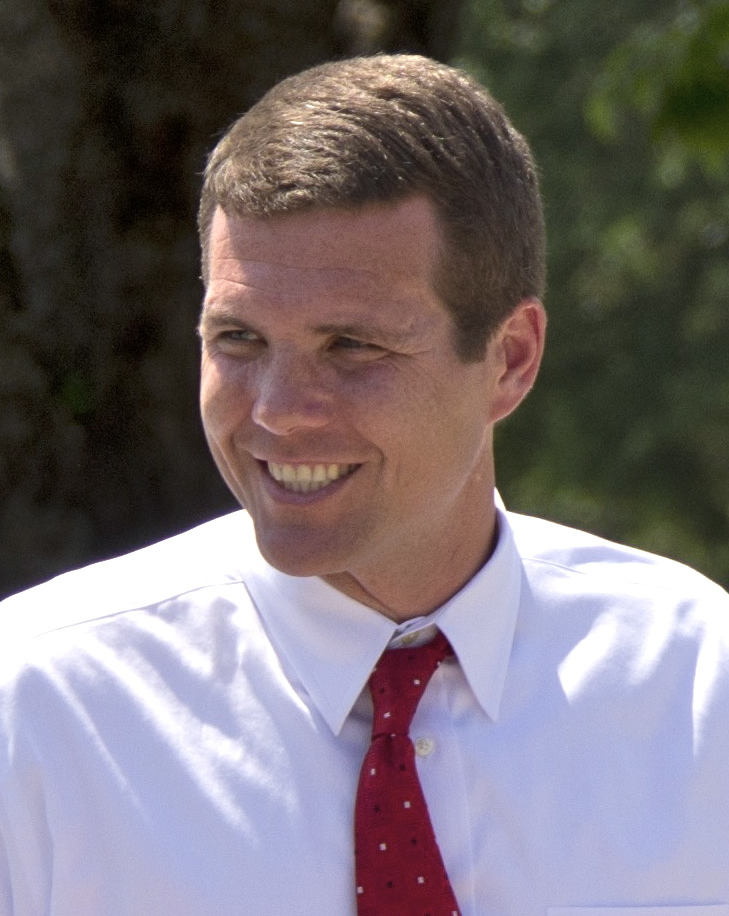
Nominee	Kay Ivey	Walt Maddox
Party	Republican	Democratic
Popular vote	1,022,457	694,495
Percentage	59.46%	40.39%
- Ivey: 40–50% 50–60% 60–70% 70–80% 80–90% >90% Maddox: 40–50% 50–60% 60–70% 70–80% 80–90% >90% Tie: 50%
Governor before election
Kay Ivey
Republican
Elected Governor
Kay Ivey
Republican

The 2018 Alabama gubernatorial election took place on November 6, 2018. Incumbent Governor Kay Ivey (R), who took office upon the resignation of Robert Bentley (R), ran for election to a full term and defeated Democratic Tuscaloosa mayor Walt Maddox by a wide margin. Ivey was sworn in for her first full term on January 14, 2019.

== Republican primary ==
=== Candidates ===
==== Declared ====
- Tommy Battle, mayor of Huntsville
- Scott Dawson, evangelist
- Bill Hightower, state senator
- Kay Ivey, incumbent governor
- Michael McAllister, former prison officer (died April 2018)

==== Withdrew ====
- Slade Blackwell, state senator
- David Carrington, Jefferson County Commissioner
- Twinkle Cavanaugh, president of the Public Service Commission (running for lieutenant governor)
- Stacy Lee George, former Morgan County Commissioner and candidate for governor in 2014
- Josh Jones, businessman
- John McMillan, Alabama Commissioner of Agriculture and Industries (running for state treasurer)

==== Declined ====
- Rick Burgess, radio host
- Bill "Bubba" Bussey, radio host
- Bradley Byrne, U.S. Representative and candidate for governor in 2010 (running for reelection)
- Mary Scott Hunter, member of the Alabama State Board of Education (running for the state senate after initially running for lieutenant governor)
- Del Marsh, president pro tempore of the Alabama Senate (running for reelection)
- Arthur Orr, state senator (running for reelection)
- Trip Pittman, state senator and candidate for the U.S. Senate in 2017
- Greg Reed, Majority Leader of the Alabama Senate (running for reelection)
- Luther Strange, former U.S. senator and former attorney general of Alabama
- Tommy Tuberville, former Auburn University football coach
- Cam Ward, state senator (running for reelection)
- Jim Zeigler, State Auditor of Alabama (running for reelection)

=== Endorsements ===
Scott Dawson

Politicians

- Mike Huckabee, former governor of Arkansas

Individuals

- Rick Burgess, radio host
- Bill "Bubba" Bussey, radio host

Organizations

- Alabama Republican Assembly
- BamaCarry, Alabama's largest Second Amendment rights group
Kay Ivey

State senators

- State Sen. Greg Albritton (R-Range)
- State Sen. Clyde Chambliss (R-Prattville)
- State Sen. Jimmy Holley (R-Elba)
- State Sen. Del Marsh. (R-Anniston), president pro tempore of the Alabama Senate
- State Sen. Jim McClendon (R-Springville)
- State Sen. Tim Melson (R-Florence)
- State Sen. Arthur Orr (R-Decatur)
- State Sen. Greg Reed (R-Jasper), Majority Leader of the Alabama Senate
- State Sen. Paul Sanford (R-Huntsville)
- State Sen. Clay Scofield (R-Guntersville)
- State Sen. Jabo Waggoner (R-Vestavia Hills)
- State Sen. Cam Ward (R-Alabaster)
- State Sen. Phil Williams (R-Rainbow City)

State representatives

- Rep. Alan Baker (R-Brewton)
- Rep. Chris Blackshear (R-Phenix City)
- Rep. Alan Boothe (R-Troy)
- Rep. K.L. Brown (R-Jacksonville)
- Rep. Donnie Chesteen (R-Geneva)
- Rep. Steve Clouse (R-Ozark)
- Rep. Terri Collins (R-Decatur)
- Rep. Danny Crawford (R-Athens)
- Rep. Corley Ellis (R-Columbiana)
- Rep. David Faulkner (R-Mountain Brook)
- Rep. Joe Faust (R-Fairhope)
- Rep. Bob Fincher (R-Woodland)
- Rep. Danny Garrett (R-Trussville)
- Rep. Lynn Greer (R-Rogersville)
- Rep. Alan Harper (R-Northport)
- Rep. Steve Hurst (R-Munford)
- Rep. Reed Ingram (R-Montgomery)
- Rep. Ken Johnson (R-Moulton)
- Rep. Nathaniel Ledbetter (R-Rainsville)
- Rep. Paul Lee (R-Dothan)
- Rep. Joe Lovvorn (R-Auburn)
- Rep. Steve McMillan (R-Bay Minette)
- Rep. Becky Nordgren (R-Gadsden)
- Rep. Phillip Pettus (R-Killen)
- Rep. Bill Poole (R-Tuscaloosa)
- Rep. Chris Pringle (R-Mobile)
- Rep. Kerry Rich (R-Guntersville)
- Rep. Chris Sells (R-Evergreen)
- Rep. Randall Shedd (R-Cullman)
- Rep. David Standridge (R-Hayden)
- Rep. Allen Treadaway (R-Morris)
- Rep. Randy Wood (R-Anniston)

Individuals

- Edward Aldag, founder and CEO of Medical Properties Trust
- David Cooper, director of Alabama Power Co.
- Stacy Lee George, former Morgan County commissioner and candidate for governor in 2018

Organizations

- Alabama Farmers Federation
Tommy Battle

Individuals

- Dale Jackson, radio host
- Tommy Tuberville, former Auburn Tigers head football coach

=== Polling ===
Poll source	Date(s) administered	Sample size	Margin of error	Tommy Battle	Scott Dawson	Bill Hightower	Kay Ivey	Undecided
The Tarrance Group (R-Ivey)	May 20–22, 2018	602	± 4.1%	18%	7%	5%	58%	12%
Leverage Public Strategies	April 23–30, 2018	600	± 3.9%	11%	9%	4%	47%	30%
The Tarrance Group (R-Ivey)	August 28–30, 2017	601	± 4.1%	11%	–	3%	66%	16%

Hypothetical polling

Poll source	Date(s) administered	Sample size	Margin of error	Tommy Battle	Young Boozer	Bill Hightower	Mike Hubbard	Kay Ivey	Tim James	Del Marsh	John McMillan	John Merrill	Roy Moore	Martha Roby	Luther Strange	Undecided/ Other
Public Insight Research	July 2016	607	–	9%	2%	–	–	–	3%	2%	3%	3%	28%	6%	19%	24%
Public Insight Research	July 2015	601	–	–	–	–	4%	–	4%	5%	2%	3%	32%	–	19%	30%

=== Results ===
Results by county: Ivey: >90%; 70–80%; 60–70%; 50–60%; 40–50%; Battle: 40–50%; 60–70%

Republican primary results
Party	Candidate	Votes	%
Republican	Kay Ivey (incumbent)	330,743	56.10%
Republican	Tommy Battle	146,887	24.92%
Republican	Scott Dawson	79,302	13.45%
Republican	Bill Hightower	29,275	4.97%
Republican	Michael McAllister (deceased)	3,326	0.56%
Total votes		589,533	100%

== Democratic primary ==
=== Candidates ===
==== Declared ====
- Sue Bell Cobb, former Chief Justice of the Alabama Supreme Court
- Christopher A. Countryman, equality activist, former juvenile corrections officer and former pastor
- James C. Fields, former state representative and nominee for lieutenant governor in 2014
- Walt Maddox, mayor of Tuscaloosa
- Doug "New Blue" Smith, nominee for Alabama Commissioner of Agriculture and Industries in 2014
- Anthony White, ordained minister

==== Withdrew ====
- Jason Childs, truck driver and former pastor

==== Declined ====
- Doug Jones, U.S. senator
- Terri Sewell, U.S. representative for Alabama's 7th Congressional District

=== Endorsements ===
Sue Bell Cobb

Politicians

- Thomas Parchman III, candidate for Jefferson County Circuit Clerk

Individuals

- J. Norman Baldwin, author and professor of Political Science at University of Alabama
- Wade Chapman, student activist
- Josh Coleman, Central Alabama Pride
- Suzanne Durham, former CEO of YMCA Birmingham
- Quincy Hall, Equality Alabama Board of Directors president
- Ruth Harrell, former president of the Alabama State Nurses Association
- Miah Jackson, councilwoman for Selma, Alabama
- Frannie James, Jefferson County Democratic Party executive director
- Mark Johnston, former candidate for governor of Alabama
- Billy Jones, president of Crowne Healthcare
- Lilly Ledbetter
- Lonnie Malone, executive director of the Effective Family Inc.
- Kelley Parris, director of the Children's Board of Hillsborough County
- John A. Pickens, former executive director of Alabama Appleseed Center
- Joanne Shum, director of Alabama HIPPY
- James T. Stephens, chairman of EBSCO Industries
- Sue Thompson, activist

Organizations

- Alabama Progressive Democratic Alliance
James Fields

Unions

- RWDSU
Christopher A. Countryman

Organizations

- Alabama Internet Democrats
- Alabama United
- Madison County Our Revolution of Madison County, Alabama
- Millions for Medicare of Alabama
- Power House of Montgomery, Alabama

Individuals

- Cortney Brown, businesswoman of Huntsville, Alabama
- Bev Cowling, director of Madison County Our Revolution of Madison County, Alabama
- John Harrison, minister and human rights advocate of Birmingham, Alabama
- Mia Raven, director of Power House of Montgomery, Alabama
- Jeni Tanner-Jordan, former president of the Greater Birmingham chapter of the National Organization For Women of Birmingham, Alabama
Walt Maddox

Politicians

- Roger Bedford Jr., former Alabama state senator 1994–2014
- Napoleon Bracy Jr., Alabama state representative
- Tony Cherry, Choctaw county commissioner
- Sue Bell Cobb, former candidate for governor of Alabama and former Chief Justice of Alabama
- Merika Coleman, Assistant Minority Leader of the Alabama House of Representatives
- Linda Coleman-Madison, Alabama state senator
- Anthony Daniels, Minority Leader of the Alabama House of Representatives
- Christopher J. England, Alabama state representative
- Parker Griffith, former U.S. representative, former candidate for governor in 2014
- Bob Harrison, Madison County, Alabama commissioner
- Doug Jones, U.S. senator (D-AL)
- Susan Lane, Westover, Alabama councilwoman
- Kelvin Lawrence, Alabama state representative
- Artis J. McCampbell, Alabama State Representative
- Larry Means, mayor of Attalla, Alabama
- Darrio Melton, mayor of Selma, Alabama
- Mary Moore, Alabama state representative
- John Rogers, Alabama state representative
- Terri Sewell, U.S. representative (AL-7)
- Bobby Singleton, Alabama state senator
- Susan Smith, Atmore, Alabama councilwoman
- Ron Sparks, former Alabama Commissioner of Agriculture and Industries, candidate for governor of Alabama in 2010
- Patricia Todd, Alabama state representative; first openly gay elected official in Alabama
- Randall Woodfin, mayor of Birmingham, Alabama

Individuals

- Lars Anderson, reporter for The Athletic
- Pat Edington, former vice chair of the Alabama Democratic Party
- Brandon Hamner, president of United Steelworkers Local 351
- Jack Jacobs, UMWA chairman
- Tom Ksobiech, associate dean at University of Alabama Law School
- Elliot Maisel, chairman of the Mobile Airport Authority
- Zac McCrary, Democratic pollster
- Alex McDaniel, editorial director of Oxford Eagle and Oxford Magazine
- Charles Morgan, Alabama restaurateur
- Jim Page, president of West Alabama Chamber of Commerce
- Sarah Patterson, former head coach of the Alabama Crimson Tide women's gymnastics team
- Tony Quillen, president of IBEW 558
- Steven Reed, Montgomery County probate judge
- Shelia Hocutt Remington, former Alabama Education Association president
- Bren Riley, Alabama AFL-CIO president
- Richard Allen Smith, MSNBC contributor and former staffer at the Department of Veteran Affairs
- Kurt Thomas, UAB track and field head coach
- Bob Vance, circuit court judge

Organizations

- Alabama Democratic Conference
- Alabama New South Alliance
- Central Alabama Labor Federation
- International Brotherhood of Electrical Workers
- Jefferson County Millennial Democrats
- Lee County Voters League
- Professional Firefighters of Alabama
- United Mine Workers
- West Alabama AFL-CIO

Newspapers

- The Crimson White

=== Results ===
Results by county: Maddox: >90%; 80–90%; 70–80%; 60–70%; 50–60%; 40–50%; <40%; Cobb: <40%; 40–50%; 50–60%; Fields: 50–60%; White: <40%

Democratic primary results
Party	Candidate	Votes	%
Democratic	Walt Maddox	154,559	54.60%
Democratic	Sue Bell Cobb	82,043	28.98%
Democratic	James Fields	22,635	8.00%
Democratic	Anthony White	9,677	3.42%
Democratic	Doug "New Blue" Smith	9,244	3.27%
Democratic	Christopher Countryman	4,923	1.74%
Total votes		283,081	100%

== Independents ==
=== Candidates ===
==== Declared ====
- Tony Hewitt Jr., police officer
- Eric Lathan, security guard, Iraq War veteran and candidate for the Jefferson County Commission in 2010

==== Declined ====
- Mark Johnston, pastor, businessman and summer camp executive director

== General election ==
=== Predictions ===
Source	Ranking	As of
The Cook Political Report	Safe R	October 26, 2018
The Washington Post	Safe R	November 5, 2018
FiveThirtyEight	Safe R	November 5, 2018
Rothenberg Political Report	Safe R	November 1, 2018
Sabato's Crystal Ball	Safe R	November 5, 2018
RealClearPolitics	Safe R	November 4, 2018
Daily Kos	Safe R	November 5, 2018
Fox News (Note: The Fox News Midterm Power Rankings uniquely does not contain a category for Safe/Solid races)	Likely R	November 5, 2018
Politico	Safe R	November 5, 2018
Governing	Safe R	November 5, 2018

=== Endorsements ===
Kay Ivey

State senators

- State Sen. Greg Albritton (R-Range)
- State Sen. Clyde Chambliss (R-Prattville)
- State Sen. Jimmy Holley (R-Elba)
- State Sen. Del Marsh. (R-Anniston), president pro tempore of the Alabama Senate
- State Sen. Jim McClendon (R-Springville)
- State Sen. Tim Melson (R-Florence)
- State Sen. Arthur Orr (R-Decatur)
- State Sen. Greg Reed (R-Jasper), Majority Leader of the Alabama Senate
- State Sen. Paul Sanford (R-Huntsville)
- State Sen. Clay Scofield (R-Guntersville)
- State Sen. Jabo Waggoner (R-Vestavia Hills)
- State Sen. Cam Ward (R-Alabaster)
- State Sen. Phil Williams (R-Rainbow City)

State representatives

- Rep. Alan Baker (R-Brewton)
- Rep. Chris Blackshear (R-Phenix City)
- Rep. Alan Booth (R-Troy)
- Rep. K.L. Brown (R-Jacksonville)
- Rep. Donnie Chesteen (R-Geneva)
- Rep. Steve Clouse (R-Ozark)
- Rep. Terri Collins (R-Decatur)
- Rep. Danny Crawford (R-Athens)
- Rep. Corley Ellis (R-Columbiana)
- Rep. David Faulkner (R-Mountain Brook)
- Rep. Joe Faust (R-Fairhope)
- Rep. Bob Fincher (R-Woodland)
- Rep. Danny Garrett (R-Trussville)
- Rep. Lynn Greer (R-Rogersville)
- Rep. Alan Harper (R-Northport)
- Rep. Steve Hurst (R-Munford)
- Rep. Reed Ingram (R-Montgomery)
- Rep. Ken Johnson (R-Moulton)
- Rep. Nathaniel Ledbetter (R-Rainsville)
- Rep. Paul Lee (R-Dothan)
- Rep. Joe Lovvorn (R-Auburn)
- Rep. Steve McMillan (R-Bay Minette)
- Rep. Becky Nordgren (R-Gadsden)
- Rep. Phillip Pettus (R-Killen)
- Rep. Bill Poole (R-Tuscaloosa)
- Rep. Chris Pringle (R-Mobile)
- Rep. Kerry Rich (R-Guntersville)
- Rep. Chris Sells (R-Evergreen)
- Rep. Randall Shedd (R-Cullman)
- Rep. David Standridge (R-Hayden)
- Rep. Allen Treadaway (R-Morris)
- Rep. Randy Wood (R-Anniston)

Individuals

- Edward Aldag, founder and CEO of Medical Properties Trust
- David Cooper, director of Alabama Power Co.
- Stacy Lee George, former Morgan County Commissioner and candidate for governor in 2018

Organizations

- Alabama Farmers Federation
- National Federation of Independent Business
- National Right to Life
- Susan B. Anthony List
Walt Maddox

Federal officials

- Parker Griffith, former U.S. representative, former candidate for governor in 2014
- Doug Jones, U.S. senator (D-AL)
- Terri Sewell, U.S. representative (AL-7)

Local and state politicians

- Lee Auman, Democratic nominee for Alabama's 5th congressional district
- George Bandy, Alabama state representative
- Billy Beasley, Minority Leader of the Alabama State Senate
- Roger Bedford Jr., former Alabama state senator 1994–2014
- Marcel Black, Alabama state representative
- Barbara Boyd, Alabama state representative
- Will Boyd, Democratic nominee for lt. governor
- Napoleon Bracy Jr., Alabama state representative
- James Buskey, Alabama state representative
- Tony Cherry, Choctaw County commissioner
- Sue Bell Cobb, former candidate for governor of Alabama and former Chief Justice of Alabama
- Merika Coleman, Assistant Minority Leader of the Alabama House of Representatives
- Linda Coleman-Madison, Alabama state senator
- Anthony Daniels, Minority Leader of the Alabama House of Representatives
- Christopher J. England, Alabama state representative
- James C. Fields, former candidate for governor of Alabama and former State House Representative
- Vivian Davis Figures, Alabama state senator
- Mallory Hagan, Democratic nominee for Alabama's 3rd congressional district
- Laura Hall, Alabama state representative
- Bob Harrison, Madison County, Alabama commissioner
- Tabitha Isner, Democratic nominee for Alabama's 2nd congressional district
- Miranda Joseph, Democratic nominee for State Auditor
- Robert Kennedy Jr, Democratic nominee for Alabama's 1st congressional district
- Danner Kline, Democratic nominee for Alabama's 6th congressional district
- Susan Lane, Westover, Alabama councilwoman
- Kelvin Lawrence, Alabama state representative
- Richard Lindsey, Alabama state representative
- Artis J. McCampbell, Alabama state representative
- Cara McClure, Democratic nominee for Public Service Commission Place 1
- Larry Means, mayor of Attalla, Alabama
- Darrio Melton, mayor of Selma, Alabama
- Heather Milam, Democratic nominee for Secretary of State
- Mary Moore, Alabama state representative
- Johnny Mack Morrow, Alabama state representative
- Kari Powell, Democratic nominee for Public Service Commission Place 2
- John Rogers, Alabama state representative
- Joseph Siegelman, Democratic nominee for Attorney General
- Bobby Singleton, Alabama state senator
- Donna Smalley, candidate for Alabama State Supreme Court
- Doug "New Blue" Smith, former candidate for governor of Alabama and former nominee for Alabama Commissioner of Agriculture and Industries
- Susan Smith, Atmore, Alabama councilwoman
- Rodger Smitherman, Alabama state senator
- Ron Sparks, former Alabama Commissioner of Agriculture and Industries, candidate for governor of Alabama in 2010
- Patricia Todd, Alabama state representative; first openly gay elected official in Alabama
- Bob Vance, candidate for Chief Justice of the Supreme Court of Alabama
- Pebblin Warren, Alabama State Representative
- Anthony White, ordained minister and former candidate for sovernor of Alabama
- Randall Woodfin, mayor of Birmingham

Individuals

- Lars Anderson, reporter for The Athletic
- Pat Edington, former vice chair of the Alabama Democratic Party
- Brandon Hamner, president of United Steelworkers Local 351
- Jack Jacobs, UMWA chairman
- Tom Ksobiech, associate dean at University of Alabama Law School
- Elliot Maisel, chairman of the Mobile Airport Authority
- Zac McCrary, Democratic pollster
- Alex McDaniel, editorial director of Oxford Eagle and Oxford Magazine
- Charles Morgan, Alabama restaurateur
- Jim Page, president of West Alabama Chamber of Commerce
- Sarah Patterson, former head coach of the Alabama Crimson Tide women's gymnastics team
- Tony Quillen, president of IBEW 558
- Steven Reed, Montgomery County probate judge
- Shelia Hocutt Remington, former Alabama Education Association president
- Bren Riley, Alabama AFL-CIO president
- Richard Allen Smith, MSNBC contributor and former staffer at the Department of Veteran Affairs
- Jim Stovall, writer
- Kurt Thomas, UAB track and field head coach
- Marc Torrence, reporter for Patch Media
- Bob Vance, circuit court judge

Organizations

- Alabama Democratic Conference
- Alabama New South Alliance
- Central Alabama Labor Federation
- International Brotherhood of Electrical Workers
- Jefferson County Millennial Democrats
- Lee County Voters League
- Professional Firefighters of Alabama
- United Mine Workers
- West Alabama AFL-CIO

Newspapers

- The Crimson White

=== Polling ===
Poll source	Date(s) administered	Sample size	Margin of error	Kay Ivey (R)	Walt Maddox (D)	Undecided
SurveyMonkey	September 9–24, 2018	1,254	± 3.8%	51%	26%	22%
Research Consultants (R-FarmPAC)	September 22, 2018	316	± 5.5%	58%	38%	4%
Cygnal (R)	July 24–25, 2018	1,027	± 3.1%	56%	42%	3%
Neighborhood Research Corporation (R)	June 12–14 and 18–21, 2018	440	± 4.4%	53%	28%	–
ALG Research	April 27 – May 2, 2018	601	± 4.0%	59%	36%	–

=== Results ===
2018 Alabama gubernatorial election
Party	Candidate	Votes	%	±%
Republican	Kay Ivey (incumbent)	1,022,457	59.46%	−4.10%
Democratic	Walt Maddox	694,495	40.39%	+4.15%
Write-in		2,637	0.15%	–0.05%
Total votes		1,719,589	100.00%	N/A
Republican hold				

==== By county ====
County	Kay Ivey Republican		Walt Maddox Democratic		Write-in Various		Margin		Total
County	#	%	#	%	#	%	#	%	Total
Autauga	13,994	70.86%	5,734	29.03%	21	0.11%	8,260	41.82%	19,749
Baldwin	57,415	73.61%	20,464	26.24%	118	0.15%	36,951	47.37%	77,997
Barbour	4,336	51.68%	4,043	48.19%	11	0.13%	293	3.49%	8,390
Bibb	5,082	73.69%	1,799	26.09%	15	0.22%	3,283	47.61%	6,896
Blount	16,984	87.08%	2,479	12.71%	40	0.21%	14,505	74.37%	19,503
Bullock	949	25.77%	2,729	74.12%	4	0.11%	-1,780	-48.34%	3,682
Butler	4,812	58.84%	3,363	41.12%	3	0.04%	1,449	17.72%	8,178
Calhoun	24,460	66.04%	12,487	33.71%	92	0.25%	11,973	32.33%	37,039
Chambers	6,687	59.01%	4,625	40.81%	20	0.18%	2,062	18.20%	11,332
Cherokee	6,974	81.65%	1,552	18.17%	15	0.18%	5,422	63.48%	8,541
Chilton	11,291	81.81%	2,501	18.12%	10	0.07%	8,790	63.69%	13,802
Choctaw	3,475	56.68%	2,649	43.21%	7	0.11%	826	13.47%	6,131
Clarke	6,344	56.44%	4,889	43.50%	7	0.06%	1,455	12.94%	11,240
Clay	4,164	76.91%	1,241	22.92%	9	0.17%	2,923	53.99%	5,414
Cleburne	3,902	88.20%	508	11.48%	14	0.32%	3,394	76.72%	4,424
Coffee	12,117	75.86%	3,782	23.68%	73	0.46%	8,335	52.19%	15,972
Colbert	13,180	63.04%	7,692	36.79%	34	0.16%	5,488	26.25%	20,906
Conecuh	2,473	50.22%	2,444	49.63%	7	0.14%	29	0.59%	4,924
Coosa	2,785	64.56%	1,522	35.28%	7	0.16%	1,263	29.28%	4,314
Covington	9,852	81.81%	2,168	18.00%	22	0.18%	7,684	63.81%	12,042
Crenshaw	3,873	71.71%	1,522	28.18%	6	0.11%	2,351	43.53%	5,401
Cullman	24,361	84.84%	4,309	15.01%	43	0.15%	20,052	69.84%	28,713
Dale	10,528	73.59%	3,731	26.08%	47	0.33%	6,797	47.51%	14,306
Dallas	4,917	32.31%	10,295	67.64%	8	0.05%	-5,378	-35.34%	15,220
DeKalb	17,316	80.58%	4,087	19.02%	87	0.40%	13,229	61.56%	21,490
Elmore	21,752	73.72%	7,722	26.17%	31	0.11%	14,030	47.55%	29,505
Escambia	8,098	66.64%	4,035	33.20%	19	0.16%	4,063	33.43%	12,152
Etowah	24,041	69.39%	10,513	30.34%	92	0.27%	13,528	39.05%	34,646
Fayette	5,455	72.84%	2,025	27.04%	9	0.12%	3,430	45.80%	7,489
Franklin	6,465	73.27%	2,336	26.48%	22	0.25%	4,129	46.80%	8,823
Geneva	7,784	86.31%	1,220	13.53%	15	0.17%	6,564	72.78%	9,019
Greene	661	15.86%	3,506	84.12%	1	0.02%	-2,845	-68.26%	4,168
Hale	2,361	35.93%	4,206	64.00%	5	0.08%	-1,845	-28.07%	6,572
Henry	4,655	69.33%	2,045	30.46%	14	0.21%	2,610	38.87%	6,714
Houston	23,112	71.72%	9,062	28.12%	53	0.16%	14,050	43.60%	32,227
Jackson	12,074	76.99%	3,569	22.76%	39	0.25%	8,505	54.23%	15,682
Jefferson	105,661	40.94%	152,103	58.94%	304	0.12%	-46,442	-18.00%	258,068
Lamar	4,399	81.81%	974	18.11%	4	0.07%	3,425	63.70%	5,377
Lauderdale	20,692	66.82%	10,222	33.01%	51	0.16%	10,470	33.81%	30,965
Lawrence	8,181	68.16%	3,796	31.63%	25	0.21%	4,385	36.54%	12,002
Lee	29,238	59.27%	20,021	40.58%	74	0.15%	9,217	18.68%	49,333
Limestone	23,213	68.91%	10,421	30.93%	53	0.16%	12,792	37.97%	33,687
Lowndes	1,555	30.82%	3,487	69.10%	4	0.08%	-1,932	-38.29%	5,046
Macon	1,376	18.95%	5,882	81.02%	2	0.03%	-4,506	-62.07%	7,260
Madison	75,874	53.57%	65,522	46.26%	244	0.17%	10,352	7.31%	141,640
Marengo	4,029	45.95%	4,735	54.00%	5	0.06%	-706	-8.05%	8,769
Marion	8,021	80.90%	1,877	18.93%	17	0.17%	6,144	61.97%	9,915
Marshall	22,031	80.72%	5,193	19.03%	70	0.26%	16,838	61.69%	27,294
Mobile	69,671	52.19%	63,656	47.69%	158	0.12%	6,015	4.51%	133,485
Monroe	5,038	56.45%	3,881	43.49%	5	0.06%	1,157	12.97%	8,924
Montgomery	28,491	36.87%	48,722	63.05%	62	0.08%	-20,231	-26.18%	77,275
Morgan	28,415	71.82%	11,091	28.03%	57	0.14%	17,324	43.79%	39,563
Perry	1,061	24.99%	3,182	74.94%	3	0.07%	-2,121	-49.95%	4,246
Pickens	4,636	55.75%	3,672	44.16%	8	0.10%	964	11.59%	8,316
Pike	6,226	59.79%	4,176	40.10%	11	0.11%	2,050	19.69%	10,413
Randolph	5,729	75.38%	1,859	24.46%	12	0.16%	3,870	50.92%	7,600
Russell	7,168	47.63%	7,864	52.26%	17	0.11%	-696	-4.62%	15,049
Shelby	56,989	67.81%	26,928	32.04%	125	0.15%	30,061	35.77%	84,042
St. Clair	23,529	78.50%	6,389	21.32%	55	0.18%	17,140	57.18%	29,973
Sumter	1,289	23.68%	4,151	76.26%	3	0.06%	-2,862	-52.58%	5,443
Talladega	15,621	59.50%	10,606	40.40%	27	0.10%	5,015	19.10%	26,254
Tallapoosa	10,703	67.99%	5,015	31.86%	25	0.16%	5,688	36.13%	15,743
Tuscaloosa	34,335	49.91%	34,336	49.91%	122	0.18%	-1	-0.00%	68,793
Walker	17,671	76.24%	5,468	23.59%	38	0.16%	12,203	52.65%	23,177
Washington	4,729	68.46%	2,172	31.44%	7	0.10%	2,557	37.02%	6,908
Wilcox	1,577	33.42%	3,138	66.50%	4	0.08%	-1,561	-33.08%	4,719
Winston	6,580	85.38%	1,102	14.30%	25	0.32%	5,478	71.08%	7,707
Totals	1,022,457	59.46%	694,495	40.39%	2,637	0.15%	327,962	19.07%	1,719,589

==== Counties that flipped from Republican to Democratic ====
- Tuscaloosa County (largest city: Tuscaloosa)
- Jefferson County (largest city: Birmingham)

==== Counties that flipped from Democratic to Republican ====
- Barbour County (largest city: Eufaula)

==== By congressional district ====
Ivey won six of seven congressional districts.

District	Ivey	Maddox	Representative
1st	61%	39%	Bradley Byrne
2nd	64%	36%	Martha Roby
3rd	63%	37%	Mike Rogers
4th	75%	25%	Robert Aderholt
5th	61%	39%	Mo Brooks
6th	64%	35%	Gary Palmer
7th	27%	73%	Terri Sewell

== See also ==
- 2018 Alabama elections
