= Tabitha Isner =

American politician

Vice chair of the Alabama Democratic Party
- In office August 13, 2022 – August 8, 2026
- Preceded by: Patricia Todd
- Succeeded by: Caroline Self

Personal details
- Born: July 16, 1981 (age 45) Dallas, Texas, U.S.
- Party: Democratic
- Education: Washington University in St. Louis; University of Chicago

Tabitha K. Isner (born July 16, 1981) is an American politician and minister who served as the vice chair of the Alabama Democratic Party from 2022 to 2026. She was the Democratic nominee in 2018 for Alabama's 2nd congressional district.

== Early life and education ==
Isner was born in Dallas, Texas. She attended Washington University in St. Louis, where she received a bachelor's degree. She then attended the University of Chicago, and received a Master of Divinity as well as a Master of Public Policy.

== Career ==
Isner is a minister.

=== 2018 U.S. House campaign ===
In 2017, Isner announced that she would run for U.S. House in Alabama's 2nd congressional district. She defeated Audri Scott Williams in the Democratic primary on June 5, with 60% of the vote. She managed her campaign from a campaign office in Dothan. In the summer of 2018, she had raised $250,000, but did not receive the support of the Democratic Congressional Campaign Committee, or other high-profile national groups such as EMILYs List. She was defeated by incumbent Martha Roby on November 6, 2018.

=== Alabama Democratic Party leadership ===
Isner first ran for state party chair in 2019. The election was held after the national Democratic Party ordered a new election, following "procedural irregularities" with the previous one. Christopher J. England won the election, with Isner receiving 63 of 171 votes.

In 2022, she announced that she would again run for state party chair. She was defeated by Randy Kelley, but was elected vice chair in a subsequent election. At a meeting in July 2023, Kelley stated that no one in attendance was allowed to record the meeting. Isner objected to this, stating that state law allows for one-party consent in regard to digital recording. Kelley then interrupted her, shouting, "you be quiet, girl."

At the August 8, 2026 organizational meeting of the Alabama Democratic Party, Isner ran for secretary of the party, challenging incumbent Valerie Bright. Bright defeated Isner by a vote of 113 to 102.

=== Alabama Senate campaign ===
Isner qualified to run in the 26th state senate district for the 2026 election. She won the Democratic primary unopposed and will face incumbent Republican state senator Will Barfoot on November 3.

== Political positions ==
Isner describes herself as pro-choice in relation to the abortion-rights movement. She opposes a border wall, instead supporting immigration reform that expands access to legal immigration.

== Personal life ==
Isner is married to her husband, Shane. She adopted a child in 2017, after fostering children since 2014. She is Christian.
