= 1902 Alabama Attorney General election =

- November 4, 1902
Candidate	Massey Wilson	W. H. Ambrecht
Party	Democratic	Republican
Popular vote	65,341	21,446
Percentage	75.3%	24.7%
attorney general before election
Charles G. Brown
Democratic
Elected attorney general
Massey Wilson
Democratic

The 1902 Alabama Attorney General election was held on November 4, 1902, to elect the Alabama Attorney General to a four-year term. Democratic nominee Massey Wilson was elected.

== Nominees ==
- W. H. Ambrecht (Republican)
- Massey Wilson (Democratic)

== Results ==
1902 Alabama Attorney General election
Party	Candidate	Votes	%
Democratic	Massey Wilson	65,341	75.28
Republican	W. H. Ambrecht	21,446	24.71
Prohibition	H. H. Blackman (write-in)	10	0.01
Total votes		86,797	100.00
