= 1902 Alabama Commissioner of Agriculture and Industries election =

- November 4, 1902
Candidate	Robert R. Poole	T. B. McNaron
Party	Democratic	Republican
Popular vote	63,442	20,133
Percentage	73.9%	23.4%
state auditor before election
Robert R. Poole
Democratic
Elected state auditor
Robert R. Poole
Democratic

The 1902 Alabama Commissioner of Agriculture and Industries election was held on November 4, 1902, to elect the Alabama Commissioner of Agriculture and Industries to a four-year term. Incumbent Democratic commissioner Robert R. Poole was re-elected.

== Nominees ==
- Buel Andrus (Socialist)
- T. B. Morton (Republican)
- Robert R. Poole, incumbent commissioner (Democratic)

== Results ==
1902 Alabama Commissioner of Agriculture election
Party	Candidate	Votes	%
Democratic	Robert R. Poole (incumbent)	63,442	73.86
Republican	T. B. Morton	20,133	23.44
Socialist	Buel Andrus	2,312	2.69
Prohibition	C. D. Alverson (write-in)	11	0.01
Total votes		85,898	100.00
