= Scott Dawson =

Scott Dawson may refer to:

- Dax Harwood (born 1984), American professional wrestler formerly known as Scott Dawson
- Scott Dawson (evangelist) (born 1967), American author and preacher
- Scott Dawson, Roanoke Colony archaeological researcher and author
- Scott Windsor, ne Scott Dawson, fictional character in Emmerdale
