= 1994 Alabama Commissioner of Agriculture and Industries election =

- November 8, 1994
Candidate	Jack Thompson	A.W. Todd
Party	Republican	Democratic
Popular vote	566,529	541,850
Percentage	51.1%	48.9%
- County results Thompson: 50–60% 60–70% 70–80% Todd: 50–60% 60–70% 70–80% 80–90%

The 1994 Alabama Commissioner of Agriculture and Industries election was held on November 8, 1994 to elect the Alabama Commissioner of Agriculture and Industries. A.W. Todd lost re-election to a second consecutive term.

== Democratic primary ==
=== Candidates ===
==== Nominee ====
- A.W. Todd, incumbent commissioner

==== Eliminated in runoff ====
- Mac Parsons, former state senator

==== Eliminated in primary ====
- Bill Adams, former state representative
- Karen Hammac

=== Results ===
Democratic primary
Party	Candidate	Votes	%
Democratic	A.W. Todd	276,233	46.07
Democratic	Mac Parsons	144,955	23.68
Democratic	Bill Adams	123,193	20.55
Democratic	Karen Hammac	58,152	9.70
Total votes		599,533	100.00

Results by county: Todd–70–80% Todd–60–70% Todd–50–60% Todd–40–50% Tood–30–40% Parsons–30–40% Adams–30–40%

=== Runoff ===
==== Results ====
Results by county: Todd–70–80% Todd–60–70% Tood–50–60% Parsons–50–60%

Democratic primary runoff
Party	Candidate	Votes	%
Democratic	A.W. Todd	265,763	55.81
Democratic	Mac Parsons	210,402	44.19
Total votes		476,165	100.00

== Republican primary ==
=== Candidates ===
==== Nominee ====
- Jack Thompson, farmer

==== Eliminated in primary ====
- Bill Cleghorn Jr.
- Nathan Libscomb

=== Results ===
Results by county: Thompson–70–80% Thompson–60–70% Thompson–50–60% Thompson–40–50% Thompson–30–40% Cleghorn Jr.–60–70% Cleghorn Jr.–50–60% Cleghorn Jr.–40–50% Cleghorn Jr.–30–40% Lipscomb–60–70% Lipscomb–50–60% Lipscomb–40–50% Tie–30–40% No votes

Republican primary
Party	Candidate	Votes	%
Republican	Jack Thompson	78,250	49.31
Republican	Nathan Libscomb	46,432	29.26
Republican	Bill Cleghorn Jr.	33,994	21.42
Total votes		158,676	100.00

== General election ==
=== Results ===
1994 Alabama Commissioner of Agriculture and Industries election
Party	Candidate	Votes	%
Republican	Jack Thompson	566,529	51.11
Democratic	A.W. Todd	541,850	48.89
Total votes		1,108,379	100.00
