= 1902 Alabama State Treasurer election =

- November 4, 1902
| Candidate | J. Craig Smith | H. Lee Brown |
| Party | Democratic | Republican |
| Popular vote | 65,207 | 22,176 |
| Percentage | 74.6% | 25.4% |
Secretary of State before election
J. Craig Smith
Democratic
Elected Secretary of State
J. Craig Smith
Democratic

The 1902 Alabama State Treasurer election was held on November 4, 1902, to elect the Alabama State Treasurer to a four-year term. Incumbent Democratic treasurer J. Craig Smith was re-elected.

== Nominees ==
- H. Lee Brown (Republican)
- J. Craig Smith, incumbent treasurer (Democratic)

== Results ==
1902 Alabama State Treasurer election
| Party | Candidate | Votes | % |
|---|---|---|---|
| Democratic | J. Craig Smith (incumbent) | 65,207 | 74.61 |
| Republican | H. Lee Brown | 22,176 | 25.38 |
| Prohibition | R. O. Simpson (write-in) | 9 | 0.01 |
| Total votes | | 87,392 | 100.00 |
