= 1902 Alabama State Auditor election =

- November 4, 1902
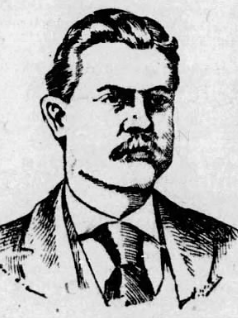

Candidate	Thomas L. Sowell	T. B. McNaron
Party	Democratic	Republican
Popular vote	64,686	21,769
Percentage	74.8%	25.2%
state auditor before election
Thomas L. Sowell
Democratic
Elected state auditor
Thomas L. Sowell
Democratic

The 1902 Alabama State Auditor election was held on November 4, 1902, to elect the State Auditor of Alabama to a four-year term. Incumbent Democratic auditor Thomas L. Sowell was re-elected.

== Nominees ==
- T. B. McNaron (Republican)
- Thomas L. Sowell, incumbent auditor (Democratic)

== Results ==
1902 Alabama State Auditor election
Party	Candidate	Votes	%
Democratic	Thomas L. Sowell (incumbent)	64,686	74.81
Republican	T. B. McNaron	21,769	25.18
Prohibition	J. D. Albritton (write-in)	12	0.01
Total votes		86,467	100.00
Democratic hold			
