= Andrew Hayden =

American politician

Member of the Alabama House of Representatives from the 72nd district
- In office November 9, 1994 – November 6, 2002
- Succeeded by: Bobby Singleton

Personal details
- Born: July 18, 1919 Greenwood, Mississippi
- Died: May 3, 2015 (aged 95) Uniontown, Alabama
- Party: Democratic

Andrew Hayden (July 18, 1919 – May 3, 2015) was an American politician who served in the Alabama House of Representatives from the 72nd district from 1994 to 2002.

He died on May 3, 2015, in Uniontown, Alabama at age 95.
