= Joe L. Reed =

American politician, activist and educator (born 1938)

Joe Louis Reed Sr.

Vice-Chair of Minority Affairs of the Alabama Democratic Party
- In office 1972–2019
- Preceded by: Position established

Chair of the Alabama Democratic Conference
- Incumbent
- Assumed office 1979

Montgomery City Council, District 3
- In office 1975–1999
- Preceded by: Position established
- Succeeded by: Tracy Larkin

Personal details
- Born: 1938 (age 87–88) Evergreen, Conecuh County, Alabama, U.S.
- Party: Democratic
- Spouse: Mollie Perry-Reed (m. 1964)
- Children: 3, including Steven Reed
- Education: Alabama State University (BA)
- Occupation: Politician, activist, educator

Joe Louis Reed Sr. (born 1938) is an American politician, activist and educator. He is the current Vice-Chair of Minority Affairs of the Alabama Democratic Party and, since 1979, chair of the Alabama Democratic Conference (ADC). He also served as president of the all-Black Alabama State Teachers Association prior to its merger with the all-White Alabama Education Association in 1969, and then served as associate executive secretary alongside Executive Secretary Paul Hubbert from 1969 until both leaders retired from the AEA in 2011.

== Biography ==
Born in Evergreen, Conecuh County, Alabama in 1938, Reed graduated from Conecuh County Training School in 1956 and later served in the integrated U.S. Army. When he returned to segregated life in Alabama, he attended Alabama State University, where he served as student body president and worked as a student-worker. However, after he joined a Montgomery County courthouse lunch counter sit-in on February 25, 1960, he was placed on probation before his eventual graduation with a baccalaureate in 1962. His participation in the sit-in is linked to the landmark federal court case Dixon v. Alabama, which ruled that public institutions of higher education cannot discipline students without due process. Two years after graduation, Reed became executive secretary of the Alabama State Teachers Association. He would soon lead a merger with the then-politically-dormant, all-White Alabama Educational Association, and the two would merge in 1969, leading to a much higher political profile for Reed.

In 1975, Reed won a seat on the newly-formed Montgomery City Council, winning District 3 by 918 votes and becoming one of the first four African-American officeholders in Montgomery since the Reconstruction era. He held his seat on the Council until his defeat in 1999 by Tracy Larkin, by which time he was the last of the original members ever elected to the Council.

He served as chairman of the Alabama State University (ASU) Board of Trustees from 1990 until 2008.

He married Mollie Perry-Reed in 1964, and they have three children Irva, Joe, and Steven; Steven served as the Montgomery County Probate Judge, and, in 2019, became the first black mayor for Montgomery ever elected in its 200-year history.

== Controversy ==
=== ASU Acadome ===
From its opening in 1992 until May 2008, the stadium at Alabama State University was named the Joe L. Reed Acadome. In 2008, the Alabama State Board of Trustees voted to remove Reed's name from the building, based upon claims that Reed gave the university negative publicity and wasted taxpayer money by filing too many frivolous lawsuits. The trustees renamed the court as the Dunn-Oliver Acadome in honor of the university's two most successful basketball coaches, Charles Johnson "C.J." Dunn and James V. Oliver. This furthered a debate between members of the board and Reed's supporters. In the 2009 legislative session, two legislators filed bills to restore Reed's name to the building, but both were withdrawn.

In 2026, Reed's name was restored to the Acadome, now known as the "Joe L. Reed Dunn-Oliver Acadome."

=== Role in the Alabama Democratic Party ===
Reed was appointed by then-chair of the Alabama Democratic Party (ADP) Robert Smith Vance as vice-chair of minority affairs in 1972, a position which he held until 2019. Reed has been depicted as highly influential in the ADP, even though he has never served as chair. Under ADP bylaws and a 1990 consent decree regarding minority representation, Reed, as the ADP's vice-chair of minority affairs, was able to personally select over 30 individual members to the ADP's State Democratic Executive Committee (SDEC). His behavior was cited as a reason for several dissenting African-American politicians to form a rival to the ADC, the Alabama New South Coalition, in 1986.

In the 2018 election for ADP chair, Reed backed Nancy Worley for re-election over Montgomery attorney Peck Fox, who was supported by Sen. Doug Jones. However, after Worley won re-election, the election was challenged before the Democratic National Committee, on the grounds that several participants on the Alabama State Democratic Executive Committee's election for chair and vice-chair did not have proper credentials present during the election. The DNC Credentials Committee ruled in February 2019 that the SDEC must approve new bylaws changes which reflect more diversity among the Democratic voter base in Alabama, hold a new election for SDEC members, and hold a new election for chair and vice-chair. By November 2019, Worley was replaced by Christopher J. England, but Reed was retained as vice-chair of minority affairs. Reed and his role in the controversial election and preceding events were the subject of a three-part series entitled "The Real Enemy," produced by Emmanuel Dzotsi for the podcast Reply All.
