= Joe Turnham =

American politician (born 1959)

Chairman, Alabama Democratic Party
- In office 2005–2011
- Preceded by: Charles Redding Pitt
- Succeeded by: Mark Kennedy

Personal details
- Born: October 28, 1959 Lee County, Alabama
- Party: Democratic
- Website: http://www.joeturnham.com

Joe Turnham (born October 28, 1959, in Lee County, Alabama) is a United States politician who chaired the Alabama Democratic Party from 2005 to 2011.

== Family and education ==
Turnham and his family reside in Auburn, and he is the son of Pete Turnham, a retired educator and a former member of the Alabama House of Representatives.

He attended Samford University in Birmingham, but transferred to and later graduated from Auburn University in 1981 with a Bachelor of Science degree in Business Administration. Upon graduation he joined "Alabama Contract Sales, Incorporated," the family business. Joe is an accomplished consultant and business development specialist who works with companies and organizations all over the world.

== Community activism ==
Turnham has served on civic boards and has been active in church. While President of the Auburn Kiwanis Club he was named Kiwanian of the Year. He also served in the Auburn Chamber of Commerce, Lee County Habitat for Humanity, Boys and Girls Clubs of Greater Lee County. Turnham is a founding board member of Land Trust of East Alabama, board member of the Chattowah Alabama Land Trust, Vice-chair of Redeem the Vote and board member of Sigma Nu fraternity House Corporation.

Turnham has participated as a lay missioner to Venezuela and in various leadership capacities in Trinity United Methodist Church in Opelika. Joe was also the local Lee County Democratic Club President and the Lee County Democratic Party Chairman.

== Political career ==
As one of the youngest people to ever serve in the position, Turnham was elected Chairman of the Alabama Democratic Party in October 1995 and served through most of 1998.

In his first bid for elected public office in 1998, Turnham was Democratic nominee for the 3rd District's U.S. Congressional seat against incumbent U.S. Congressman Bob Riley. Turnham lost the race with 42% of all votes cast. Five newspapers endorsed him.

In 2002, Turnham was again the party nominee for the 3rd District's U.S. Congressional seat running against Republican Mike Rogers. This campaign became especially negative as the Rogers campaign provided a phone number in a television ad and encouraged voters to "Call Joe Turnham and tell him he's too liberal for Alabama". Neck and neck in the polls, a well timed visit from U.S. President George W. Bush campaigning on behalf of Rogers a week before the election was able to give Rogers the boost he needed to eventually win the election with only 50.31% of the vote.

In 2005, Turnham was again elected Chair of the Alabama Democratic Party filling the term of Redding Pitt who had resigned.

Turnham was unopposed for re-election to a full term as party chair. On January 20, 2007, he was unanimously re-elected by the State Democratic Executive Committee to a term that runs through 2011.

He is also a member of the Board of Directors of Democrats for Life of America.

== Media and party recognition ==
For 31 months he was a member of the Democratic National Committee in Washington. He has been featured in state and national news publications including The National Journal and a January 1998 front page spread in the Wall Street Journal. He has also appeared on several nationally syndicated programs including the Oliver North Show. Most recently he founded Conservation Alabama, originally called the Alabama League of Environmental Action Voters (AlaLEAVs), as a political arm for Alabama's environmental movement.
