= 2018 United States House of Representatives elections in Alabama =

- November 6, 2018

All 7 Alabama seats to the United States House of Representatives
- Turnout: 48.01%
	Majority party	Minority party
Party	Republican	Democratic
Last election	6	1
Seats won	6	1
Seat change	Steady	Steady
Popular vote	975,737	678,687
Percentage	58.78%	40.89%
Swing	▼5.85%	▲7.95%

Republican
50–60%
60–70%
70–80%
80–90%
Democratic
50–60%
60–70%
70–80%
80–90%
>90%

The 2018 United States House of Representatives elections in Alabama were held on November 6, 2018, to elect the seven U.S. representatives from the state of Alabama, one from each of the state's seven congressional districts. The elections coincided with other elections to the House of Representatives, as well as elections to the United States Senate and various state and local elections. The primaries were held on June 5, with all choosing a nominee except the Republican primary in the 2nd district, which went to a July 17 runoff. The 2018 general election saw no change in Alabama's representation, remaining at a 6–1 GOP advantage, even though Democrats won over 40% of the statewide vote.

== Overview ==
=== Statewide ===
Party	Candidates	Votes		Seats		
Party	Candidates	No.	%	No.	+/–	%
Republican	6	975,737	58.78	6	Steady	85.72
Democratic	7	678,687	40.89	1	Steady	14.28
Write-in	7	5,471	0.33	0	Steady	0.00
Total	20	1,659,895	100.0	7	Steady	100.0

Popular vote
Republican	58.78%
Democratic	40.89%
Other	0.33%

House seats
Republican	85.72%
Democratic	14.28%

=== District ===
Results of the 2018 United States House of Representatives elections in Alabama by district:

District	Republican		Democratic		Others		Total		Result
District	Votes	%	Votes	%	Votes	%	Votes	%	Result
District 1	153,228	63.15%	89,226	36.78%	163	0.07%	242,617	100.0%	Republican hold
District 2	138,879	61.39%	86,931	38.43%	420	0.18%	226,230	100.0%	Republican hold
District 3	147,770	63.72%	83,996	36.22%	149	0.06%	231,915	100.0%	Republican hold
District 4	184,255	79.77%	46,492	20.13%	222	0.10%	230,969	100.0%	Republican hold
District 5	159,063	61.02%	101,388	38.89%	222	0.09%	260,673	100.0%	Republican hold
District 6	192,542	69.18%	85,644	30.77%	142	0.05%	278,328	100.0%	Republican hold
District 7	0	0.00%	185,010	97.80%	4,153	2.20%	189,163	100.0%	Democratic hold
Total	975,737	58.78%	678,687	40.89%	5,471	0.33%	1,659,895	100.0%	

== District 1 ==
2018 Alabama's 1st congressional district election
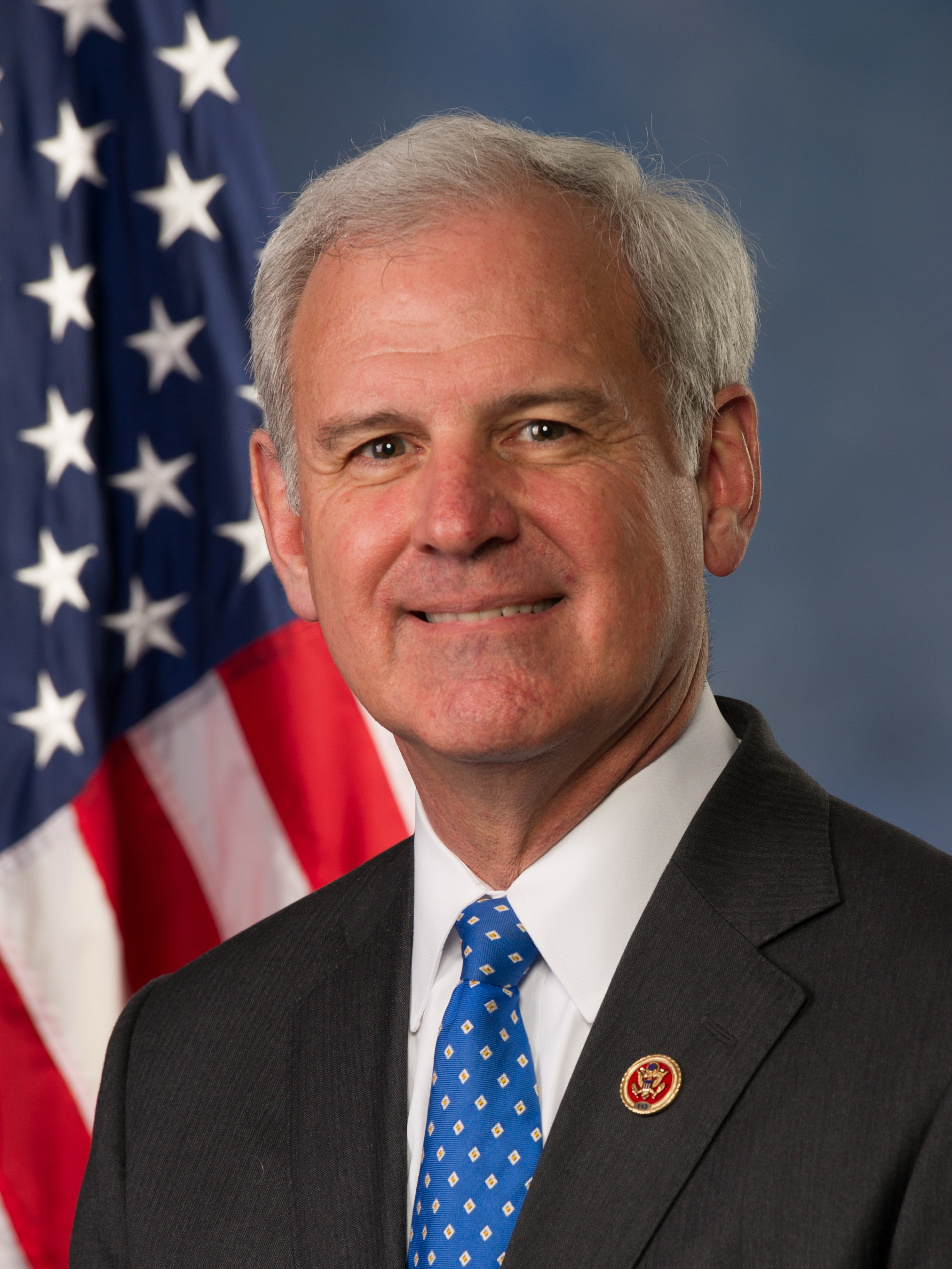

Nominee	Bradley Byrne	Robert Kennedy Jr.
Party	Republican	Democratic
Popular vote	153,228	89,226
Percentage	63.2%	36.8
- County results Byrne: 50–60% 60–70% 70–80%
U.S. Representative before election
Bradley Byrne
Republican
Elected U.S. Representative
Bradley Byrne
Republican

Incumbent Republican Bradley Byrne, who had represented the district since 2013, ran for re-election. He was re-elected with 96% of the vote in 2016. The district had a PVI of R+15.

=== Republican primary ===
==== Candidates ====
===== Nominee =====
- Bradley Byrne, incumbent U.S. Representative

=== Democratic primary ===
==== Candidates ====
===== Nominee =====
- Robert Kennedy Jr., digital marketing executive and candidate for US Senate in 2017 (no relation to the Massachusetts Kennedy family)

===== Eliminated in primary =====
- Lizzetta Hill McConnell, former president of NAACP Mobile County

==== Primary results ====
Democratic primary results
Party	Candidate	Votes	%
Democratic	Robert Kennedy Jr.	27,561	80.8
Democratic	Lizzetta Hill McConnell	6,562	19.2
Total votes		34,123	100.0

=== Predictions ===
Source	Ranking	As of
The Cook Political Report	Safe R	November 5, 2018
Inside Elections	Safe R	November 5, 2018
Sabato's Crystal Ball	Safe R	November 5, 2018
RealClearPolitics	Safe R	November 5, 2018
Daily Kos	Safe R	November 5, 2018
FiveThirtyEight	Safe R	November 6, 2018

==== Results ====
2018 Alabama's 1st congressional district election
Party	Candidate	Votes	%
Republican	Bradley Byrne (incumbent)	153,228	63.2
Democratic	Robert Kennedy Jr.	89,226	36.8
Write-in		163	0.1
Total votes		242,617	100.0
Republican hold			

== District 2 ==
2018 Alabama's 2nd congressional district election
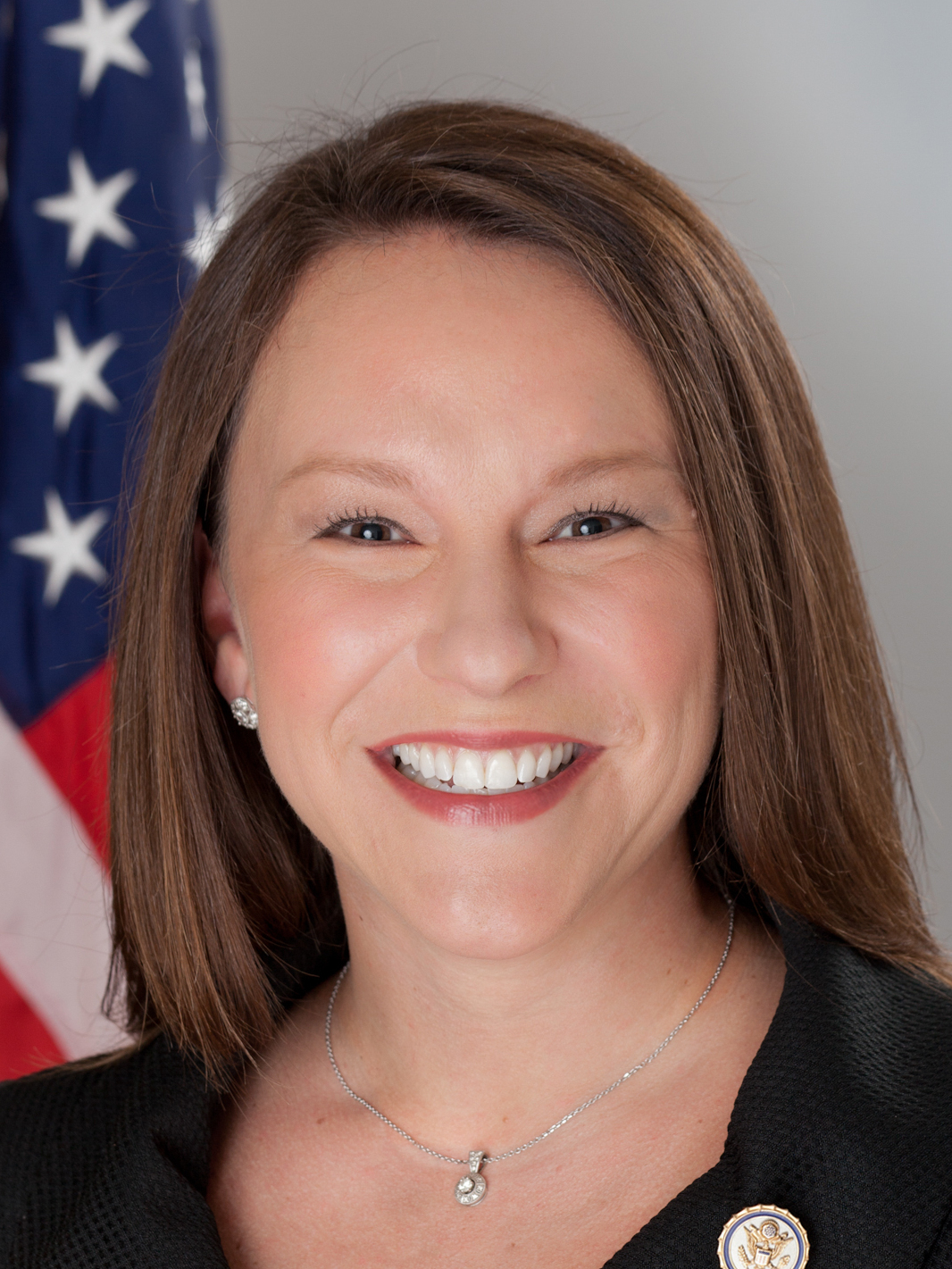

Nominee	Martha Roby	Tabitha Isner
Party	Republican	Democratic
Popular vote	138,879	86,931
Percentage	61.4%	38.4%
- County results Roby: 50–60% 60–70% 70–80% 80–90% Isner: 50–60% 60–70% 70–80%
U.S. Representative before election
Martha Roby
Republican
Elected U.S. Representative
Martha Roby
Republican

Incumbent Republican Martha Roby, who had represented the district since 2011, ran for re-election. She was re-elected with 49% of the vote in 2016. The district had a PVI of R+16.

=== Republican primary ===
==== Candidates ====
===== Nominee =====
- Martha Roby, incumbent U.S. Representative

===== Eliminated in primary =====
- Tommy Amason, retired US Army sergeant major
- Bobby Bright, former Democratic U.S. Representative for this seat and former mayor of Montgomery
- Rich Hobson, former campaign manager for Senate candidate Roy Moore
- Barry Moore, state representative

==== Endorsements ====
Martha Roby

Organizations

- National Right to Life Committee

==== Primary results ====
Republican primary results
Party	Candidate	Votes	%
Republican	Martha Roby (incumbent)	36,708	39.0
Republican	Bobby Bright	26,481	28.1
Republican	Barry Moore	18,177	19.3
Republican	Rich Hobson	7,052	7.5
Republican	Tommy Amason	5,763	6.1
Total votes		94,181	100.0

==== Runoff results ====
Republican primary runoff results
Party	Candidate	Votes	%
Republican	Martha Roby (incumbent)	48,331	67.9
Republican	Bobby Bright	22,795	32.1
Total votes		71,126	100.0

=== Democratic primary ===
The Democratic Congressional Campaign Committee included Alabama's 2nd congressional district on its initial list of Republican-held seats considered targets in 2018.

==== Candidates ====
===== Nominee =====
- Tabitha Isner, business analyst

===== Eliminated in primary =====
- Audri Scott Williams

==== Primary results ====
Democratic primary results
Party	Candidate	Votes	%
Democratic	Tabitha Isner	20,351	60.5
Democratic	Audri Scott Williams	13,315	39.5
Total votes		33,666	100.0

=== Predictions ===
Source	Ranking	As of
The Cook Political Report	Safe R	November 5, 2018
Inside Elections	Safe R	November 5, 2018
Sabato's Crystal Ball	Safe R	November 5, 2018
RealClearPolitics	Safe R	November 5, 2018
Daily Kos	Safe R	November 5, 2018
FiveThirtyEight	Safe R	November 6, 2018

==== Results ====
2018 Alabama's 2nd congressional district election
Party	Candidate	Votes	%
Republican	Martha Roby (incumbent)	138,879	61.4
Democratic	Tabitha Isner	86,931	38.4
Write-in		420	0.2
Total votes		226,230	100.0
Republican hold			

== District 3 ==
2018 Alabama's 3rd congressional district election
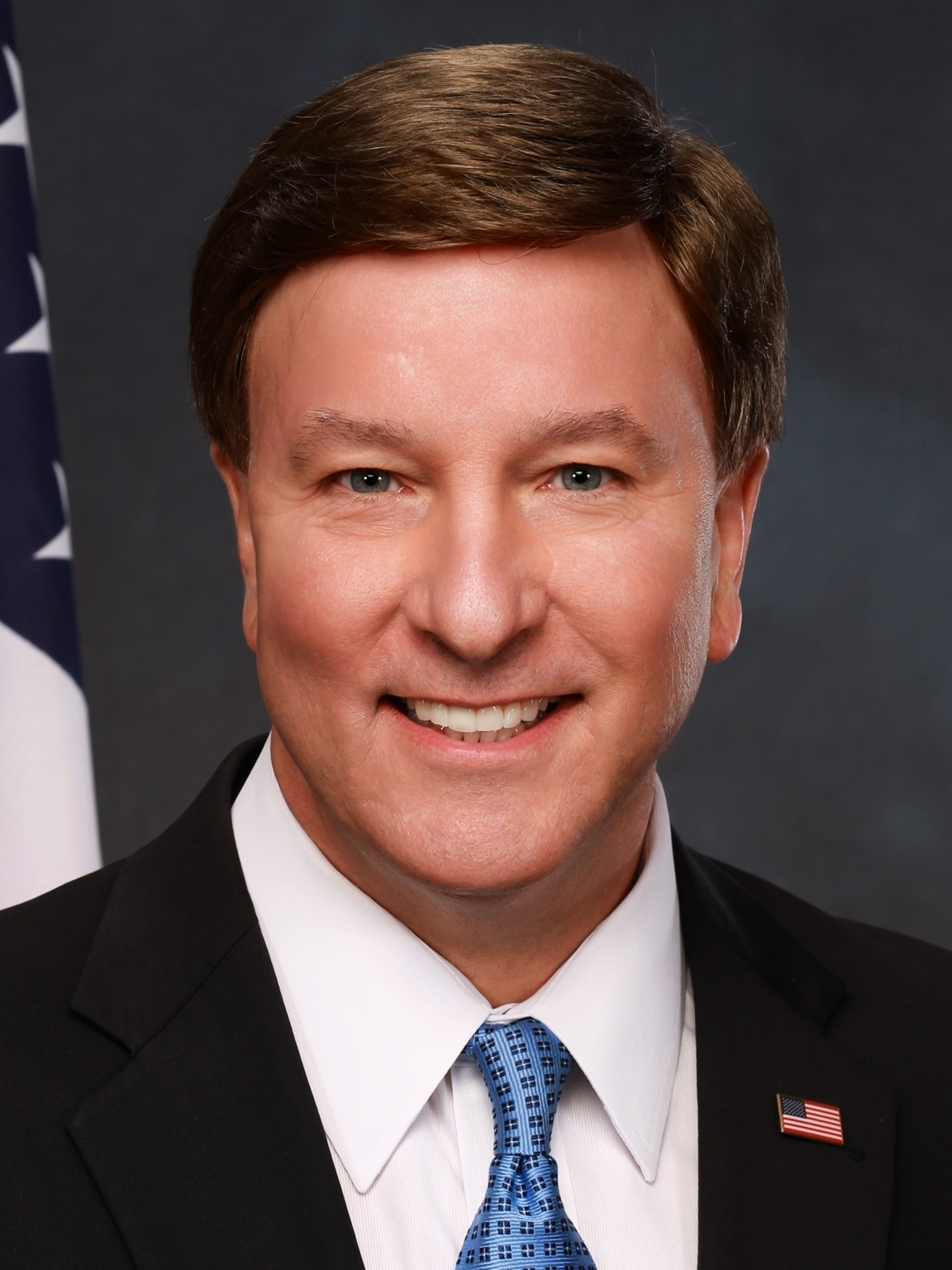

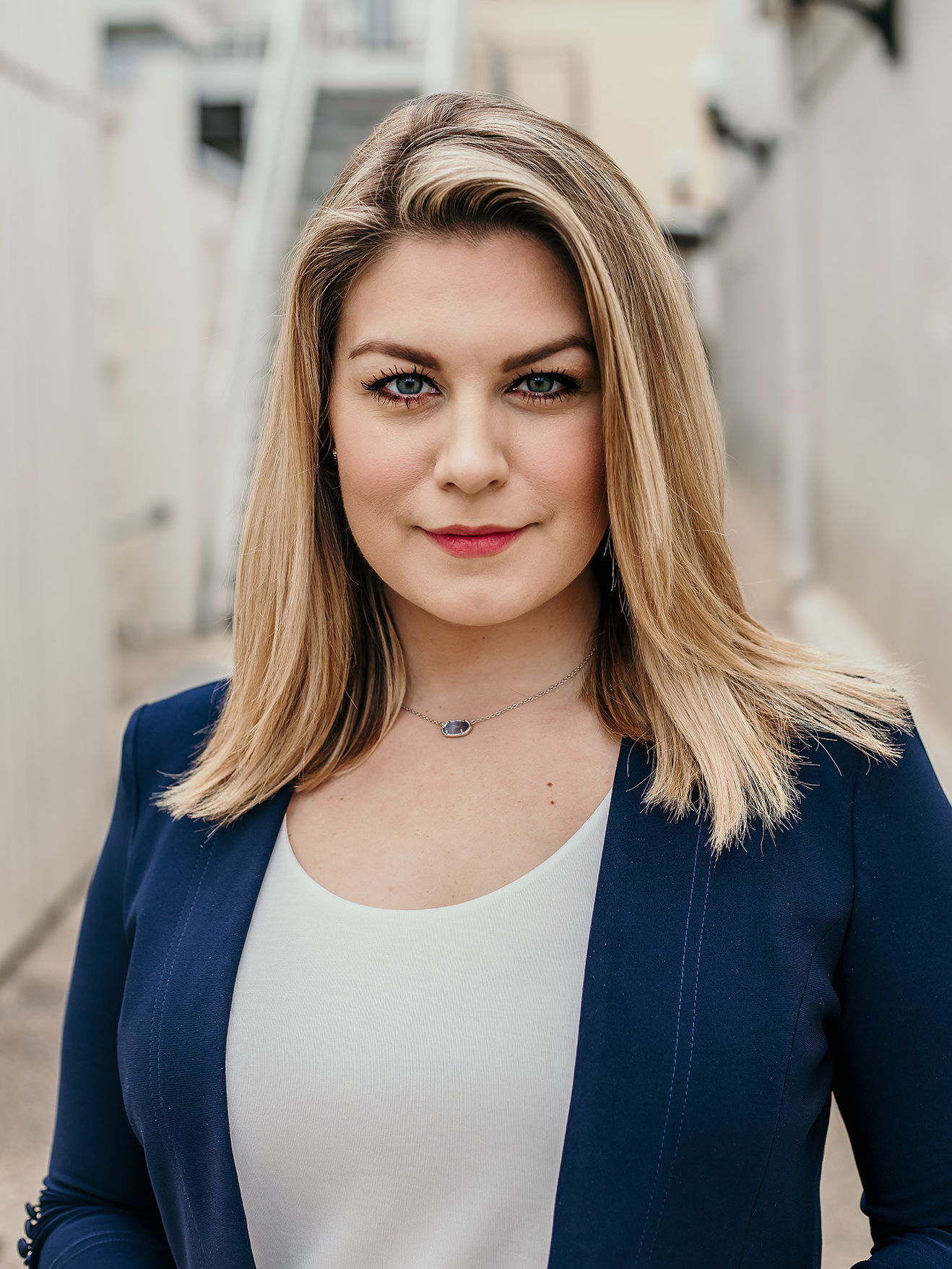
Nominee	Mike Rogers	Mallory Hagan
Party	Republican	Democratic
Popular vote	147,770	83,996
Percentage	63.7%	36.2%
- County results Rogers: 50–60% 60–70% 70–80% 80–90% Hagan: 50–60% 80–90%
U.S. Representative before election
Mike Rogers
Republican
Elected U.S. Representative
Mike Rogers
Republican

Incumbent Republican Mike Rogers, who had represented the district since 2003, ran for re-election. He was re-elected with 67% of the vote in 2016. The district had a PVI of R+16.

=== Republican primary ===
==== Candidates ====
===== Nominee =====
- Mike Rogers, incumbent U.S. Representative

=== Democratic primary ===
==== Candidates ====
===== Nominee =====
- Mallory Hagan, news anchor and Miss America 2013

===== Eliminated in primary =====
- Adia McClellan Winfrey, psychologist

==== Primary results ====
Democratic primary results
Party	Candidate	Votes	%
Democratic	Mallory Hagan	21,410	65.7
Democratic	Adia McClellan Winfrey	11,157	34.3
Total votes		32,567	100.0

=== Predictions ===
Source	Ranking	As of
The Cook Political Report	Safe R	November 5, 2018
Inside Elections	Safe R	November 5, 2018
Sabato's Crystal Ball	Safe R	November 5, 2018
RealClearPolitics	Safe R	November 5, 2018
Daily Kos	Safe R	November 5, 2018
FiveThirtyEight	Safe R	November 6, 2018

==== Endorsements ====
Mallory Hagan (D)

Labor unions

- Retail, Wholesale and Department Store Union

Organizations

- End Citizens United
- Everytown for Gun Safety

Individuals

- Lilly Ledbetter, activist, public speaker and author

==== Results ====
2018 Alabama's 3rd congressional district election
Party	Candidate	Votes	%
Republican	Mike Rogers (incumbent)	147,770	63.7
Democratic	Mallory Hagan	83,996	36.2
Write-in		149	0.1
Total votes		231,915	100.0
Republican hold			

== District 4 ==
2018 Alabama's 4th congressional district election
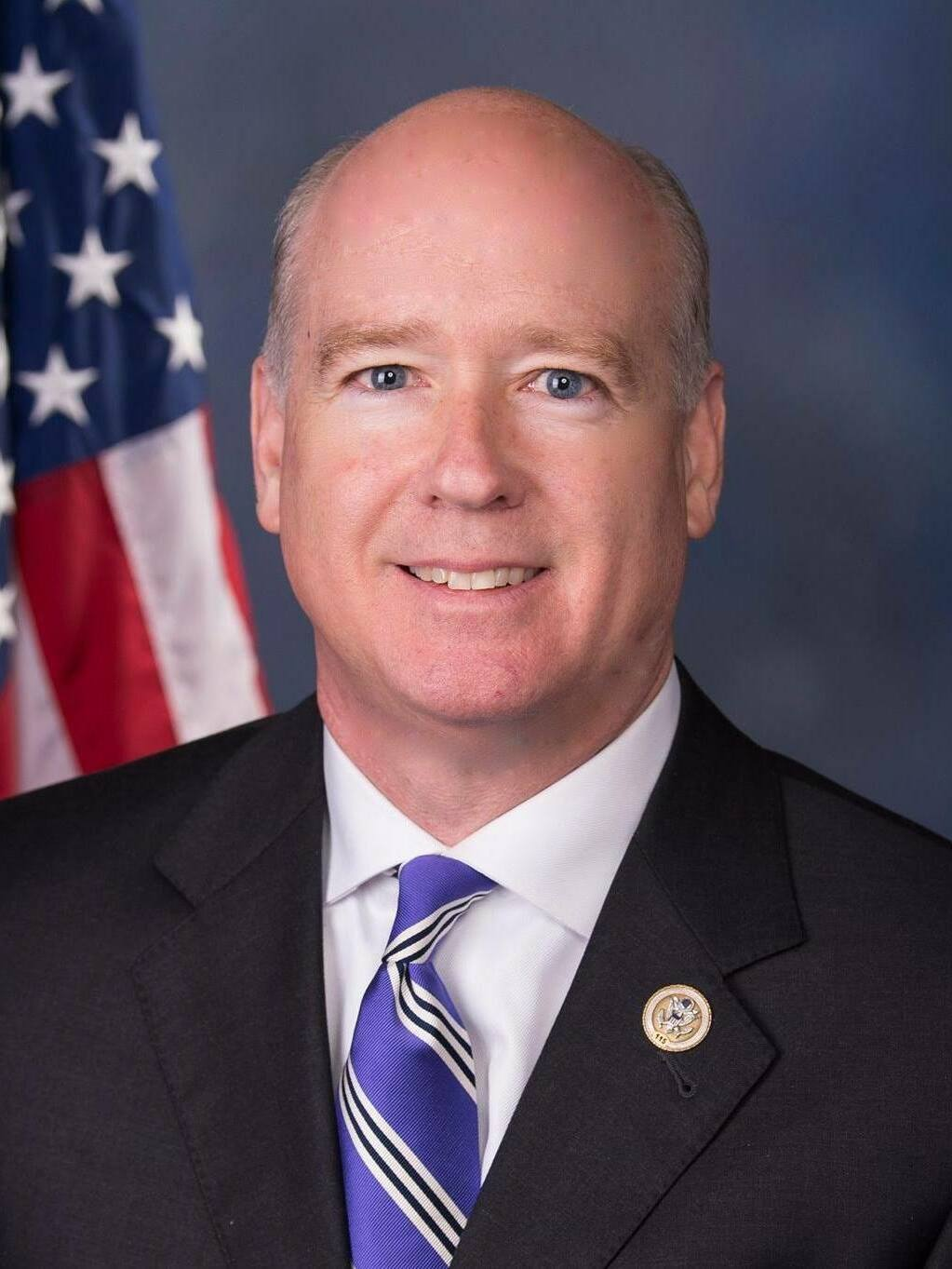

Nominee	Robert Aderholt	Lee Auman
Party	Republican	Democratic
Popular vote	184,255	46,492
Percentage	79.8%	20.1%
- County results Aderholt: 60–70% 70–80% 80–90% >90%
U.S. Representatives before election
Robert Aderholt
Republican
Elected U.S. Representatives
Robert Aderholt
Republican

Incumbent Republican Robert Aderholt, who had represented the district since 1997, ran for re-election. He was re-elected with 99% of the vote in 2016. The district had a PVI of R+30.

=== Republican primary ===
==== Candidates ====
===== Nominee =====
- Robert Aderholt, incumbent U.S. Representative

===== Eliminated in primary =====
- Anthony Blackmon

==== Primary results ====
Republican primary results
Party	Candidate	Votes	%
Republican	Robert Aderholt (incumbent)	93,959	81.5
Republican	Anthony Blackmon	21,366	18.5
Total votes		115,325	100.0

=== Democratic primary ===
==== Candidates ====
===== Nominee =====
- Lee Auman

===== Eliminated in primary =====
- Rick Neighbors

==== Primary results ====
Democratic primary results
Party	Candidate	Votes	%
Democratic	Lee Auman	8,609	54.1
Democratic	Rick Neighbors	7,297	45.9
Total votes		15,906	100.0

=== Predictions ===
Source	Ranking	As of
The Cook Political Report	Safe R	November 5, 2018
Inside Elections	Safe R	November 5, 2018
Sabato's Crystal Ball	Safe R	November 5, 2018
RealClearPolitics	Safe R	November 5, 2018
Daily Kos	Safe R	November 5, 2018
FiveThirtyEight	Safe R	November 6, 2018

==== Results ====
2018 Alabama's 4th congressional district election
Party	Candidate	Votes	%
Republican	Robert Aderholt (incumbent)	184,255	79.8
Democratic	Lee Auman	46,492	20.1
Write-in		222	0.1
Total votes		230,969	100.0
Republican hold			

== District 5 ==
2018 Alabama's 5th congressional district election
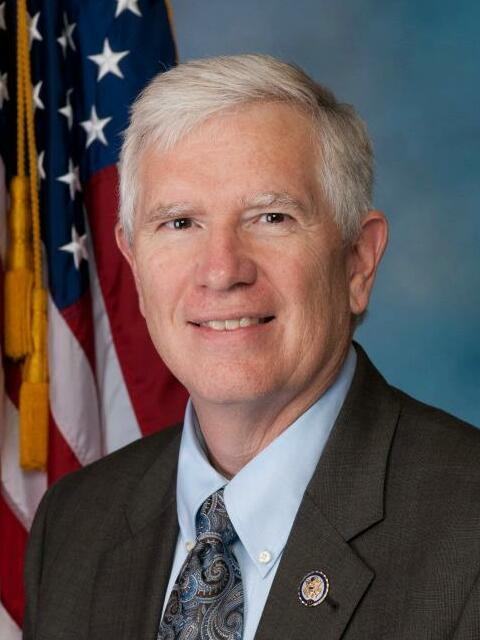

Nominee	Mo Brooks	Peter Joffrion
Party	Republican	Democratic
Popular vote	159,063	101,388
Percentage	61.0%	38.9%
- County results Brooks: 50–60% 60–70% 70–80%
U.S. Representative before election
Mo Brooks
Republican
Elected U.S. Representative
Mo Brooks
Republican

Incumbent Republican Mo Brooks, who had represented the district since 2011, ran for re-election. He was re-elected with 67% of the vote in 2016. The district had a PVI of R+18.

=== Republican primary ===
==== Candidates ====
===== Nominee =====
- Mo Brooks, incumbent U.S. Representative

===== Eliminated in primary =====
- Clayton Hinchman, businessman and former U.S. Army captain

==== Primary results ====
Republican primary results
Party	Candidate	Votes	%
Republican	Mo Brooks (incumbent)	54,928	61.3
Republican	Clayton Hinchman	34,739	38.7
Total votes		89,667	100.0

=== Democratic primary ===
==== Candidates ====
===== Nominee =====
- Peter Joffrion, former Huntsville City Attorney

=== Predictions ===
Source	Ranking	As of
The Cook Political Report	Safe R	November 5, 2018
Inside Elections	Safe R	November 5, 2018
Sabato's Crystal Ball	Safe R	November 5, 2018
RealClearPolitics	Safe R	November 5, 2018
Daily Kos	Safe R	November 5, 2018
FiveThirtyEight	Safe R	November 6, 2018

==== Results ====
2018 Alabama's 5th congressional district election
Party	Candidate	Votes	%
Republican	Mo Brooks (incumbent)	159,063	61.0
Democratic	Peter Joffrion	101,388	38.9
Write-in		222	0.1
Total votes		260,673	100.0
Republican hold			

== District 6 ==
2018 Alabama's 6th congressional district election
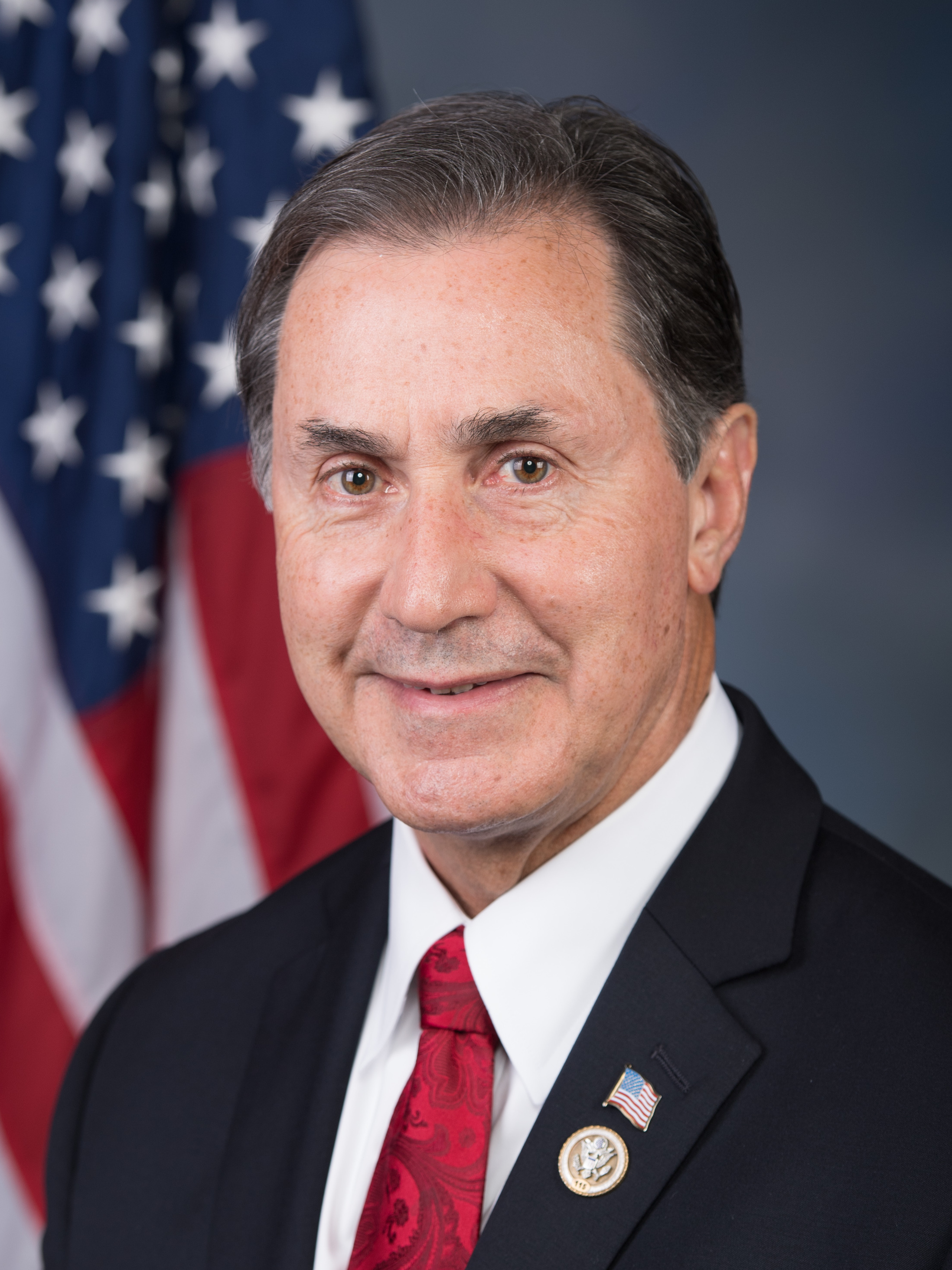

Nominee	Gary Palmer	Danner Kline
Party	Republican	Democratic
Popular vote	192,542	85,644
Percentage	69.2%	30.8%
- County results Palmer: 60–70% 70–80% 80–90%
U.S. Representatives before election
Gary Palmer
Republican
Elected U.S. Representatives
Gary Palmer
Republican

Incumbent Republican Gary Palmer, who had represented the district since 2015, ran for re-election. He was re-elected with 74% of the vote in 2016. The district had a PVI of R+26.

=== Republican primary ===
==== Candidates ====
===== Nominee =====
- Gary Palmer, incumbent U.S. Representative

=== Democratic primary ===
==== Candidates ====
===== Nominee =====
- Danner Kline, businessman

=== Predictions ===
Source	Ranking	As of
The Cook Political Report	Safe R	November 5, 2018
Inside Elections	Safe R	November 5, 2018
Sabato's Crystal Ball	Safe R	November 5, 2018
RealClearPolitics	Safe R	November 5, 2018
Daily Kos	Safe R	November 5, 2018
FiveThirtyEight	Safe R	November 6, 2018

==== Results ====
2018 Alabama's 6th congressional district election
Party	Candidate	Votes	%
Republican	Gary Palmer (incumbent)	192,542	69.2
Democratic	Danner Kline	85,644	30.8
Write-in		142	0.0
Total votes		278,328	100.0
Republican hold			

== District 7 ==
2018 Alabama's 7th congressional district election
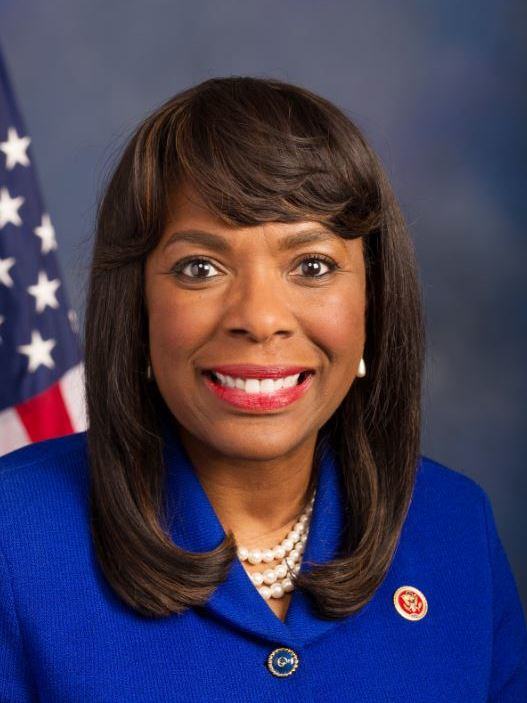
Nominee	Terri Sewell
Party	Democratic
Popular vote	185,010
Percentage	97.8%
- County results Sewell: >90%
U.S. Representative before election
Terri Sewell
Democratic
Elected U.S. Representative
Terri Sewell
Democratic

Incumbent Democrat Terri Sewell, who had represented the district since 2011, ran for re-election. She was re-elected with 98% of the vote in 2016. The district had a PVI of D+20.

=== Democratic primary ===
==== Candidates ====
===== Nominee =====
- Terri Sewell, incumbent U.S. Representative

=== Republican primary ===
No Republicans filed.

=== Predictions ===
Source	Ranking	As of
The Cook Political Report	Safe D	November 5, 2018
Inside Elections	Safe D	November 5, 2018
Sabato's Crystal Ball	Safe D	November 5, 2018
RealClearPolitics	Safe D	November 5, 2018
Daily Kos	Safe D	November 5, 2018
FiveThirtyEight	Safe D	November 6, 2018

==== Results ====
2018 Alabama's 7th congressional district election
Party	Candidate	Votes	%
Democratic	Terri Sewell (incumbent)	185,010	97.8
Write-in		4,153	2.2
Total votes		189,163	100.0
Democratic hold			

Official campaign websites
- District 1
  - Bradley Byrne (R) for Congress
  - Robert Kennedy Jr. (D) for Congress
- District 2
  - Tabitha Isner (D) for Congress
  - Martha Roby (R) for Congress
- District 3
  - Mallory Hagan (D) for Congress
  - Mike Rogers (R) for Congress
- District 4
  - Robert Aderholt (R) for Congress
  - Lee Auman (D) for Congress
- District 5
  - Mo Brooks (R) for Congress
  - Peter Joffrion (D) for Congress
- District 6
  - Danner Kline (D) for Congress
  - Gary Palmer (R) for Congress
- District 7
  - Terri Sewell (D) for Congress
