= Bryant Melton =

American politician (born 1940)

Member of the Alabama House of Representatives from the 70th district
- In office 1982–2006

Personal details
- Born: May 9, 1940 (age 86) Marion, Alabama, United States
- Party: Democratic

Bryant Melton, Jr. (born May 9, 1940) is an American politician. He was a member of the Alabama House of Representatives from the 70th District, serving from 1982 to 2006. He is a member of the Democratic party.

A federal probe of funding in Alabama's two year college program in 2006 discovered that Melton had obtained $68,000 of grant funds in a money laundering scheme with The Alabama Fire College foundation. He pled guilty, resigned from his seat and was given a 15-month sentence.
