= Bobby Singleton (politician) =

American politician

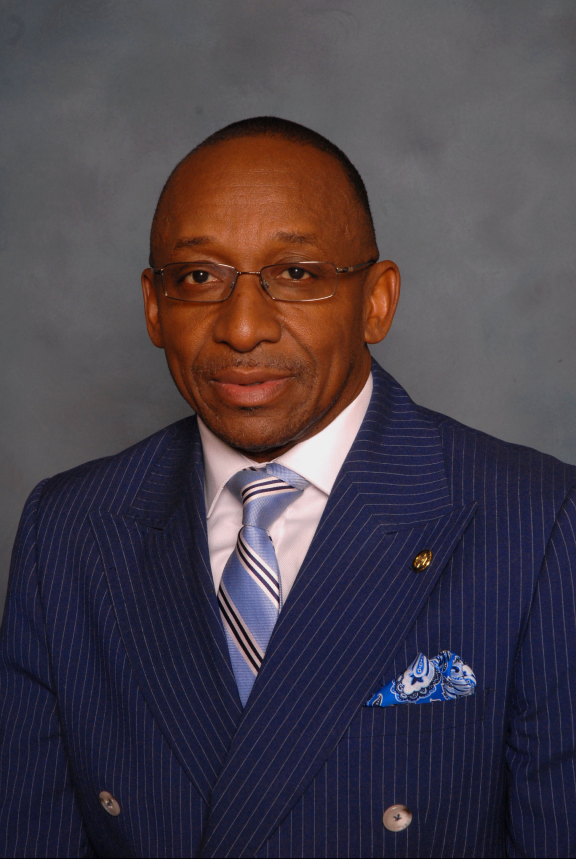

Chair of the Alabama Democratic Party
- Incumbent
- Assumed office August 8, 2026
- Preceded by: Randy Kelley

Minority Leader of the Alabama Senate
- Incumbent
- Assumed office January 8, 2019
- Preceded by: Billy Beasley

Member of the Alabama Senate from the 24th district
- Incumbent
- Assumed office January 26, 2005
- Preceded by: Charles Steele

Member of the Alabama House of Representatives from the 72nd district
- In office November 6, 2002 – January 26, 2005
- Preceded by: Andrew Hayden
- Succeeded by: Ralph Howard

Personal details
- Born: March 25, 1962 (age 64) Greensboro, Alabama
- Party: Democratic
- Education: Alabama State University (BS); Miles Law School (JD)
- Website: Official website

Bobby D. Singleton (born March 25, 1962) is an American politician who is currently a Democratic member of the Alabama Senate, representing the 24th District since a special election in January 2005. Previously he was a member of the Alabama House of Representatives from 2002 through 2005. He's served as chair of the Alabama Democratic Party since August 2026.

== Biography ==
Born in Greensboro, Alabama, Singleton received a B.S. degree in Criminal Justice from Alabama State University and a J.D. from Miles Law School. He is a member of the Greenleaf Missionary Baptist Church in Greensboro. Singleton is the former chairman of the Alabama Legislative Black Caucus as well as Minority Whip of the Democratic caucus.

On August 8, 2026, Singleton was elected chair of the Alabama Democratic Party, beating out Randy Kelley, who was running for re-election, by a vote of 165-62. Singleton was nominated for the position by House Minority Leader Anthony Daniels. As chair, Singleton announced a 90-day plan built around three phases — "listen, build, and mobilize" — that includes visiting all 67 Alabama counties before the November 3, 2026, general election, holding fundraising events, and expanding support for county party chairs.

Alabama Senate
Preceded by Billy Beasley	Minority Leader of the Alabama Senate; 2019–present	Incumbent
Party political offices
Preceded by Randy Kelley	Chair of the Alabama Democratic Party; 2026–present	Incumbent
