= Patricia Todd =

American politician

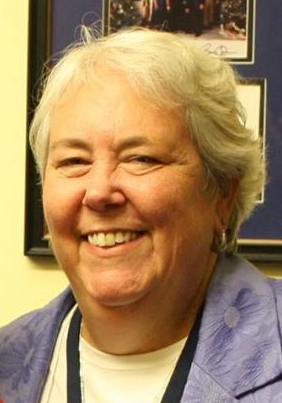
- Todd in 2015.

Vice Chair of the Alabama Democratic Party
- In office November 2, 2019 – August 13, 2022
- Preceded by: Randy Kelley
- Succeeded by: Tabitha Isner

Member of the Alabama House of Representatives from the 54th district
- In office November 8, 2006 – November 7, 2018
- Preceded by: George Perdue
- Succeeded by: Neil Rafferty

Personal details
- Born: July 25, 1955 (age 71) Richmond, Kentucky
- Party: Democratic
- Education: University of Kentucky; University of Alabama at Birmingham
- Website: patriciatodd.info

Patricia Todd (born July 25, 1955) is an American politician from Alabama. A Democrat, she was elected in November 2006 as a member of the Alabama House of Representatives representing District 54 in downtown Birmingham. She served as the First Vice Chair of the Alabama Democratic Party, and was the first LGBTQ+ Vice Chair in state party history.

She is currently the Human Rights Campaign Alabama State Director and is the first ever openly gay elected official in the state of Alabama. Formerly she was the associate director of AIDS Alabama.

In May 2018, the One Orlando Alliance, an Orlando, Florida-based LGBTQ organization, revoked an offer to Todd to become their executive director after she suggested in a Twitter post that Alabama Governor Kay Ivey is a lesbian and should be outed. "Will someone out her for God’s sake. I have heard for years that she is gay and moved her girlfriend out of her house when she became Gov. I am sick of closeted elected officials." The chairwoman of One Orlando responded that Todd's comments were not aligned with their organization, that coming out was a personal choice and doesn't support involuntary outing. Todd, however, stood by her statement.

== Early life and career ==
Todd was born in Richmond, Kentucky, growing up there and earning a bachelor's degree from the University of Kentucky. She would later attend the University of Alabama at Birmingham (UAB), earning a master's degree in public administration in 1994.

On moving to Alabama in 1986, Todd became the first executive director of Birmingham AIDS Outreach. She went on to work for other nonprofit organizations including the Alabama Humanities Foundation and the National Organization for Women. In 1998, she was appointed Director of Alumni Affairs at UAB.

== Political career ==
=== 2006 election ===
When George Perdue announced that he would not seek re-election after more than two decades in the Alabama House, Todd decided to run for the District 54 seat. The district is overwhelmingly Democratic, and five Democrats filed for the open seat, including Todd. No Republicans ran.

A primary election took place on June 6, 2006, in which Todd placed first, with 33 percent of the vote. When no candidate wins more than half of the primary vote, Alabama law provides for a run-off election between the top two finishers. Todd would face Gaynell Hendricks, who had received 29 percent of the primary vote, in the run-off.

Todd narrowly won the Democratic primary run-off on July 18, 2006, by a margin of 59 votes – 1,173 to 1,114. Her run-off victory was challenged by her opponent's mother-in-law, who claimed that Todd had received "illegal votes" and had filed a campaign finance report late. That report contained information – a $25,000 contribution from the Gay & Lesbian Victory Fund and payments to two of her primary opponents – that opponents charged could have affected the outcome.

It was widely reported that the contest centered around the question of race. Todd is white, and the outgoing legislator, like the majority of the district, is black. Many of the state's African-American political leaders were apparently eager to keep the seat in black hands.

A sub-committee of the Alabama Democratic Party (ADP) met to decide the contest and voted 5–0 to disqualify both Todd and her opponent, on the basis of what the ADP Chairman Joe Turnham called an "archaic party by-law". The by-law had not only been superseded by the 1988 Fair Campaign Practices Act but had not been followed by any candidate running for any office since 1988, including candidates for governor. It also emerged that the by-law was in violation of the federal Voting Rights Act and may well actually have been repealed.

Following sustained pressure and newspaper editorials criticising the judgement, the State Democratic Executive Committee voted on 26 August to overturn the sub-committee's ruling by a vote of 95–87. According to press reports, the voting was "mostly along racial lines".

The challenge (like Todd's original victory) attracted national attention, making The New York Times and The Washington Post, among other publications. It is also reported that the Chairman of the Democratic National Committee, Gov. Howard Dean, took a close interest, making no fewer than eight telephone calls to the executive director of the Alabama Democratic Party during the morning of the appeal.

=== In the legislature ===
In the legislature, Todd focused on issues surrounding poverty. She served on three committees: the committee on constitution and elections, the committee on boards and commissions and the committee on Jefferson County legislation.

=== 2010 re-election ===
Patricia Todd was unopposed for re-election in 2010, with no Democrat or Republican running against her. She was re-elected to a second four-year term on November 2, 2010.

=== 2014 re-election ===
Todd faced two opponents in the Democratic primary in June 2014, defeating them with 64% of the vote. She did not face a Republican opponent in November and was re-elected to a third term. She announced in February 2018 that she would not be running for re-election. She was succeeded by Neil Rafferty.
