= Redding Pitt =

American lawyer and politician (1944–2016)

Chair of the Alabama Democratic Party
- In office 2001–2005
- Preceded by: John C. H. Miller Jr.
- Succeeded by: Joe Turnham

United States Attorney for the Middle District of Alabama
- In office 1994–2001
- President: Bill Clinton
- Preceded by: James E. Wilson
- Succeeded by: Leura G. Canary

Personal details
- Born: Charles Redding Pitt; March 29, 1944 Decatur, Alabama, U.S.
- Died: February 7, 2016 (aged 71) Birmingham, Alabama, U.S.
- Party: Democratic
- Spouse: Jane H. Pitt (divorced)
- Children: 1
- Education: University of Alabama (BA); Boston College (JD)

Military service
- Branch/service: United States Army
- Years of service: 1969–1972
- Rank: Captain
- Battles/wars: Vietnam War
- Awards: Bronze Star

Charles Redding Pitt (March 29, 1944 – February 7, 2016) was an American lawyer and former chairman of the Alabama Democratic Party.

== Biography ==
=== Early life, education, and military service ===
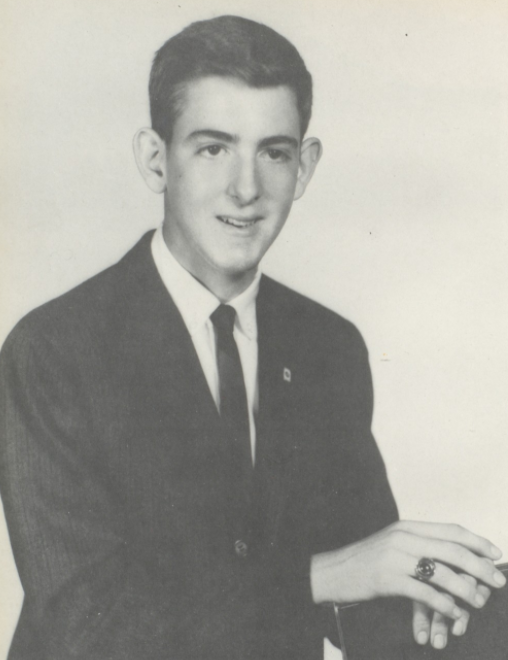
Pitt in 1962.

Pitt was born in Decatur, Alabama and graduated from Decatur High School in 1962. He attended the University of Alabama and graduated with a Bachelor of Arts degree in 1967. He was active in campaigning for Robert F. Kennedy in the 1968 presidential election.

After graduating from college Pitt entered the officer corps of the United States Army, serving from 1969 to 1972 in Vietnam, where he attained the rank of captain and earned a Bronze Star. Later he served in the Office of the Chief of Staff for Intelligence in Washington, D.C.

Following his Army service, Pitt attended Boston College Law School and received his Juris Doctor in 1977, after which he returned to his home state and began his public career.

=== Political and legal career ===
Pitt served as Alabama's Assistant Attorney General from 1981 to 1991, and Chief Deputy Attorney General from 1991 to 1994. He also served as a legal advisor to several Alabama state government officials. From 1994 to 2001 he served as United States Attorney for the Middle District of Alabama.

Later in his life, Pitt practiced law in Birmingham, Alabama. He was one of the attorneys of record for former Alabama Governor Don Siegelman during Siegelman's federal trial in the U.S. District Court for the Middle District of Alabama on charges of bribery, mail fraud, and obstruction of justice. He also continued to serve campaigns for Democratic candidates, including his Boston College classmate John Kerry in 2004. From 2001 to 2005 he served as chair of the Alabama Democratic Party.

=== Personal life and death ===
Pitt had one son, William Rivers Pitt, by his first wife, Jane H. Pitt. He was related to the 18th-century British Prime Minister William Pitt. He died on February 7, 2016, at the age of 71.
