= Scott Dawson (evangelist) =

American author and preacher

- Dawson in 2026
- Born: September 14, 1967 (age 59)
- Citizenship: United States
- Education: Samford University; Beeson Divinity School—Master of Divinity
- Occupations: Speaker-Founder, Strength to Stand Conference; Founder, Scott Dawson Evangelistic Association; Evangelist; Author
- Political party: Republican

Scott Dawson (born September 14, 1967) is an American author and evangelist, and the founder of the Scott Dawson Evangelistic Association (SDEA), and of the Strength to Stand Conference movement.

== Biography ==
Scott Dawson (born September 14, 1967) is an American evangelist, author, and Christian ministry leader. He is the founder and president of the Scott Dawson Evangelistic Association (SDEA), a Birmingham, Alabama-based evangelical organization focused on evangelism, student ministry, community outreach, and training future church leaders. He is also the founder of Strength to Stand, a student ministry of SDEA.

== Early life and Education ==
Dawson was born on September 14, 1967. He graduated from Samford University in Birmingham, Alabama, earning a Bachelor of Arts degree, and later earned a Master of Divinity from Beeson Divinity School. Dawson began preaching at the age of 16 and began speaking at churches and youth events while still a teenager.

In 1987, at the age of 19, Dawson founded the Scott Dawson Evangelistic Association. The ministry initially focused on evangelistic and student events and subsequently expanded to include large-scale evangelistic gatherings, student conferences, community outreach, worship ministry, and ministry training.

Dawson was ordained to the Gospel ministry by Roebuck Park Baptist Church in 1993.

== Ministry ==
Dawson has served as the founder and president of the Scott Dawson Evangelistic Association since its founding in 1987. SDEA works in partnership with local churches to conduct evangelistic outreach and equip churches and ministry leaders. The organization reports having conducted outreach in 32 states over nearly four decades.

SDEA's ministry has developed into several areas of outreach, including student ministry, citywide evangelism, worship ministry, and leadership training.

== Strength to Stand ==
Dawson founded Strength to Stand (STS), a student ministry of SDEA that serves middle school and high school students through conferences, camps, mission experiences, worship, and student pastor networking.

The Strength to Stand Conference has been held for more than 30 years and brings together students and churches for Christian worship, preaching, and teaching. The conference is held in Pigeon Forge, Tennessee, during the winter months. STS also operates a summer camp and mission experience designed to equip students to share their faith and serve their communities.

STS has expanded beyond its conferences to include STS Worship, which provides worship leadership at STS events and serves churches around the country, as well as the STS Network, which connects and equips student pastors.

== STS Institute ==
In 2025, SDEA launched the STS Institute, a ministry training program designed to equip future church leaders through practical and theological education. The program is based in Birmingham and operates as a ministry of the Scott Dawson Evangelistic Association.

The STS Institute offers programs in student ministry, worship leadership, children's ministry, church media, theology, leadership, and practical ministry. Its programs combine classroom instruction with practical ministry experience. The institute's two-year model consists of one year of classroom training followed by a year of supervised ministry experience in a local church.

The institute was established as part of SDEA's broader emphasis on equipping current and future church leaders for ministry.

== UNITE ==
Dawson and SDEA developed UNITE, a series of community-wide evangelistic gatherings designed to partner with local churches and reach communities through large-scale events, service projects, and personal evangelism.

UNITE began in 2021 and has been held in communities across the United States. SDEA reports that the initiative has reached approximately 85,000 people and involved more than 52,000 hours of service across participating communities. These events include community service projects, church partnerships, worship, preaching, and opportunities for attendees to hear and respond to the Christian Gospel.

UNITE events have been held in communities including Knoxville, Tennessee; Pensacola, Florida; Birmingham, Alabama; Charleston, South Carolina; San Antonio, Texas; and Las Vegas, Nevada.

== Evangelistic and Ministry Outreach ==
Throughout his ministry, Dawson has continued to preach at churches, conferences, student events, and evangelistic gatherings throughout the United States. SDEA also works with associate evangelists and ministry leaders to provide speakers and resources to local churches.

SDEA's current ministry center is located in Birmingham, Alabama. The organization moved into a new facility in 2023 following a donation that allowed it to expand its ministry and training operations.

== 2018 Gubernatorial Campaign ==
In June 2017, Dawson announced his candidacy for governor of Alabama in the 2018 Alabama gubernatorial election. He ran as a Republican and campaigned on issues including education, government reform, and other state policy issues.

Dawson finished third in the Republican primary, receiving approximately 79,000 votes, or 13.5 percent of the vote.

The 2018 campaign was Dawson's first campaign for public office.

== Writings ==
Dawson has written books and resources on Christian evangelism and ministry. His published works include:

- ''Dear Lord, Why?'' (SDEA, 2001)
- ''The Complete Evangelism Guidebook'' (Baker Books, 2006)
- ''Evangelism Today: Effectively Sharing the Gospel in a Rapidly Changing World'' (Baker Books, 2009)

His writing has focused primarily on evangelism, communicating the Christian Gospel, and equipping Christians to share their faith.

== Personal life ==
Dawson is married to Tarra Dawson. They have two children, Hunter and Hope, and reside in Birmingham, Alabama.
