= Christopher J. England =

American politician (born 1976)

Chris England
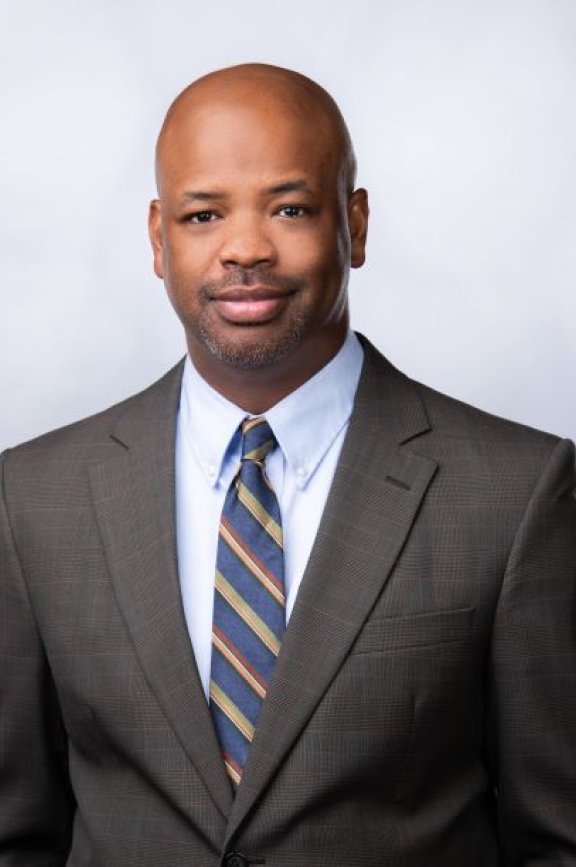

Chair of the Alabama Democratic Party
- In office November 2, 2019 – August 13, 2022
- Preceded by: Nancy Worley
- Succeeded by: Randy Kelley

Member of the Alabama House of Representatives from the 70th district
- Incumbent
- Assumed office November 8, 2006
- Preceded by: Bryant Melton

Personal details
- Born: Christopher John England; August 19, 1976 (age 49) Tuscaloosa, Alabama, U.S.
- Party: Democratic
- Education: Howard University (BA); University of Alabama, Tuscaloosa (JD)

Christopher John England (born August 19, 1976) is an American politician and the former chair of the Alabama Democratic Party. He serves in the Alabama House of Representatives. England was the first black chairman of either major political party in the history of the state of Alabama.

== Early life and education ==
England was born on August 19, 1976. His father, John H. England Jr., is a former judge of the 6th Circuit Court in Alabama, former Tuscaloosa City Council member, and served as a justice on the Alabama Supreme Court from 1999 to 2000.

England received his Bachelor of Arts from Howard University and his Juris Doctor from the University of Alabama. He is a member of the Alpha Phi Alpha fraternity and has served on the board of directors of the Police Athletic League and PRIDE.

== Career ==
England is a member of the Alabama House of Representatives, representing the 70th District unopposed since 2006. In December 2018, England was elected caucus chair of the House Democratic Caucus. England also serves as Associate City Attorney in the City of Tuscaloosa, handling Claims, Franchise Agreements, and Tax Issues.

=== Voting Rights Act ===
In 2023, the Supreme Court ruled Alabama violated the Voting Rights Act with discriminatory congressional districts that disproportionately enfranchised White voters over Black voters. England voted in dissent of the discriminatory districts and condemned the Alabama House of Representatives for letting the "dead bury the living" with the specter of racism, receiving national media attention.

Party political offices
Preceded by Nancy Worley	Chair of the Alabama Democratic Party; 2019–2022	Succeeded by Randy Kelley
