= Alabama Democratic Party =

Alabama affiliate of the Democratic Party

- Chairperson: Bobby Singleton
- House Minority Leader: Anthony Daniels
- Senate Minority Leader: Bobby Singleton
- Headquarters: 501 Adams Avenue, Montgomery, Alabama 36104
- Youth wing: Alabama Young Democrats; Alabama High School Democrats
- National affiliation: Democratic Party
- Colors: Blue
- Seats in the U.S. Senate: 0 / 2
- Seats in the U.S. House of Representatives: 2 / 7
- State Board of Education: 2 / 9
- Statewide Executive Offices: 0 / 7
- Supreme Court of Alabama: 0 / 9
- Seats in the Alabama Senate: 8 / 35
- Seats in the Alabama House of Representatives: 29 / 105

Election symbol

Website
- aldemocrats.org

The Alabama Democratic Party is the affiliate of the Democratic Party in the state of Alabama. It is chaired by Bobby Singleton.

The Alabama Democratic Party was once one of the most successful political organizations in the United States. Even after the political realignment in the height of the Civil Rights movement and the Republican Party's introduction of the Southern strategy, Democrats continued winning state and local races in Alabama. However, Jimmy Carter became the last the Democratic presidential nominee to win the state in 1976. On a state level, Republicans remained associated with the North, big business, and opportunism. Despite H. Guy Hunt having become the first Republican governor since reconstruction in 1986, Democrats had retained most statewide control. The tide only began to change in the 2000s, after Democrat Don Siegelman narrowly lost the 2002 Alabama gubernatorial election. The Democrats did not lose control of the Alabama legislature until 2010, when the Alabama Republican Party gained a majority in both houses for the first time in 136 years. Alabama lawmaker Roger Bedford, Jr. attributed this to a "Red Obama backlash tsunami", and the growing influence of George W. Bush's Republican Party in the South after the September 11 attacks.

Alabama is now considered a Republican stronghold, a substantial departure from its relatively-recent status as a Democratic stronghold. In Congress, Democrats hold two out of Alabama's seven seats in the U.S. House of Representatives. Democrats hold zero statewide offices in Alabama, and they are also the minority party in both of its state legislative chambers.

== Current elected officials ==
=== Members of Congress ===
==== U.S. House of Representatives ====
Out of the seven seats Alabama is apportioned in the U.S. House of Representatives, two are held by Democrats:

District	Member	Photo
2nd	Shomari Figures	
7th	Terri Sewell	

=== Statewide offices ===
- None

The last two times Democrats won statewide elections in Alabama was in 2008 when Lucy Baxley won 50.25% of the vote in the regularly scheduled election for President of the Alabama Public Service Commission, and in 2017 when Doug Jones, with 49.97% of the vote, won an upset victory in a U.S. Senate special election. Baxley lost re-election in 2012, as did Jones in his bid for a full term in 2020. Jones is the last Democrat to hold statewide office in Alabama, a title that Baxley had held until Jones' swearing in.

=== State Legislature ===
- Senate
  - Current senators
  - Senate Minority Leader: Bobby Singleton (SD24)
  - Senate Deputy Minority Leader: Billy Beasley (SD28)
  - Senate Minority Caucus Chair: Linda Coleman-Madison (SD20)
- House
  - Current representatives
  - House Minority Leader: Anthony Daniels (HD53)
  - House Assistant Minority Leader: Merika Coleman (HD57)
  - House Minority Caucus Chair: Christopher J. England (HD70)

=== Municipal ===
The following Democrats hold prominent mayoralties in Alabama:

- Montgomery: Steven Reed (2)
- Birmingham: Randall Woodfin (3)
- Tuscaloosa: Walt Maddox (5)

== History of the party ==
=== Creation and antebellum period ===
Created during the 1830s under the leadership of conservative figures such as William Rufus King, John Gayle and William Lowndes Yancey, the local Democratic Party took to represent the farmers and the merchants living in Northern Alabama, advocating individual rights and opposing growing centralisation, against the Whigs who represented the urban populations, the Black Belt planters and their businesses allies and who advocated a more active government in the domain of internal improvements.

In Alabama, until the Civil War, the main question were the National Bank, the tariffs and the distribution of the former Indian lands, with the preservation of slavery growing more and more in importance.

The Democratic candidates always won the gubernatorial and presidential elections in this state, except in 1845 when a dissident was elected governor and in 1860 when John Breckinridge won the state for the Southern Democrats.

=== Civil War and Reconstruction ===
The Alabama Democratic Party guided by William Lowndes Yancey and others led Alabama to secede from the Union after Republican Abraham Lincoln was elected president in 1860. The Civil War effectively ended slavery but still required a "Constitutional" emancipation of the former slaves by the ratification of the Thirteenth Amendment which the Democrats did not support, and for the next century the Democratic party was segregationist. The bi-racial Republican Party dominated Alabama politics from about 1868 to 1876 with its uneasy coalition of blacks and whites. This period resulted in major changes in the politics of Alabama, caused by the recently freed slaves voting for the Republican Party and electing Republican officials.

To counter this trend, the Democratic leadership appealed to the White supremacist sentiments and racial solidarity among the White population, and used fraud and violence by the hands of the Ku Klux Klan and other paramilitaries. This allowed them to win back the governorship in 1874 with George S. Houston.

With the Republican political collapse in the early 1870s, Democrats reasserted control over the state. While most Alabama campaigns had as their main issues taxation, the railroads, and government reform, racial politics were never very far below and oftentimes brazenly in the open. Occasionally, Democratic voters from the lower classes challenged the Bourbon Democrats Black Belt-Big Mule Coalition inside the Democratic Party. Several unsuccessful attempts to challenge the coalition of planters from the Black Belt and industrialists from the emerging city of Birmingham occurred in the party primaries. By the 1890s, these failures caused many poor whites to join with the Populists and the Republicans in a biracial coalition. These efforts came close to dislodging the Democrats from power. But the Democratic leadership broke this populist movement through a combination of fraud, intimidation tactics, and deal-making that ultimately resulted in passage of the 1901 Constitution that disenfranchised almost all black voters and even most poor whites.

=== As part of the "Solid South" ===
Adoption of The 1901 State Constitution was intended to permanently end any challenge to one-party Democratic rule and restore white supremacy in government. The Alabama Democratic party's leadership successfully disenfranchised most of the Black and poor Whites in the state, by implementation of a poll tax, literacy tests and a grandfather clause; other dispositions they used in order to reduce the challenges to the Democratic party from other parties and independents were a sore-loser law and a loyalty pledge binding any participant to the Democratic primary to the Democratic candidates in the general election. This strategy was highly effective for the next 70 plus years.

Thereafter, in Alabama, until the 1960s, the main election was consequently the Democratic Party primary, since winning them was tantamount to election. Sometimes Democratic leaders opposed the conservative wing of the party, led by the Black Belt-Big Mule coalition, and other times also held the liberal wing in check that wanted a more activist government. This was usually achieved by the use of overt racial politics in state elections. However, at the same time the party would send to Washington, senators and Congressmen who regularly voted for liberal Democratic economic policies as long as it didn't interfere with maintaining segregation back in Alabama.

In 1904, the Alabama Democratic Party adopted a logo featuring a rooster and the words "White supremacy" that would appear on ballots.

Since the end of Reconstruction, the Democratic presidential candidate always won the state although, in 1928, Al Smith won by a much closer margin because of his Catholicism, his links with Tammany Hall, and his support for the repeal of Prohibition. These factors caused some party leaders to even say they would vote for the Republican presidential nominee, Hoover.

=== Civil Rights Movement ===
The Great Migration of Blacks from the Deep South to states such as New York or Ohio, where they would exercise the franchise and where they were an electoral bloc, along with a switch of public opinion meant the National Democratic Party had to act against Jim Crow. However, all the Democratic controlled southern states resisted for years.

In 1948, after the inclusion of a civil rights plank in the national Democratic Party platform and President Truman's earlier decision to integrate the Armed Forces, several Southern delegates to the Democratic National Convention fought back. Almost half of Alabama's delegation walked out of the National Convention in protest. The delegates from Alabama along with others from surrounding states then regathered in Birmingham, Alabama and formed the States' Rights Democratic Party commonly called "Dixiecrats." Leading the walkout of Alabama's delegation was then Democratic Lt. Governor, Handy Ellis. The segregationist Dixiecrats held their National Convention at the city's Municipal Auditorium in Birmingham. The Dixiecrats would nominate then-Democratic governor Strom Thurmond of South Carolina for president and Mississippi governor Fielding Wright for vice president. They faced incumbent Democratic president Harry Truman and the Republican nominee Thomas Dewey and his running mate Governor Earl Warren of California. However, in Alabama, Thurmond was the local Democratic Party's presidential candidate instead of President Harry Truman, who was not even able to secure a ballot position in Alabama due to hostility from pro-segregationist Alabama Democrats.

With the growing pressure from the national Democratic party against segregation, and the state party's continued support for "white supremacy" and the popularity of Dwight Eisenhower in the 1952 and 1956 elections support for the Democratic party among white Alabamians began to wane at the Presidential level. In this period, Alabama continued to elect pro-segregation Governors with the exception of "Big Jim" Folsom, who was considered to be a "liberal" for his time. During Folsom's second term, the U.S. Congress passed a modest Civil Rights Act of 1957, with strong bi-partisan support but Alabama's all-Democratic delegation voted against it including somewhat liberal Congressman Carl Elliott. Among other things this bill established the U.S. Commission on Civil Rights.

During the United States presidential election of 1960, as a protest against the civil rights platforms of both national parties, the Alabama Democratic Party ran a slate of five Kennedy-committed Presidential Electors and six unpledged electors, who voted for segregationist U.S. Senator Harry F. Byrd of Virginia.

In 1964, Congress passed by large bi-partisan majorities, a very strong Civil Rights Act of 1964, however, once again, Alabama's all-Democratic delegation voted against it, including Senators John Sparkman and Lister Hill who both supported a 54-day long filibuster against the legislation.

Also, in 1964, Barry Goldwater was the first Republican to carry the state since Grant on 1872; Again, the Alabama Democratic Party denied its own President Lyndon B. Johnson ballot access under the Democratic party banner. Since Johnson was not even present on the ballots eleven unpledged electors ran on the Democratic ticket.

Faced with growing numbers of new Black voters given the franchise thanks to the Voting Rights Act of 1965, the state Democratic leadership tried to attract these new voters by measures such as forming the Alabama Democratic Conference and replacing the "White supremacy" with "Democrats" on their logo; nevertheless, the party remained deeply divided on both racial politics and the inside battle between Loyalists, liberals or moderates "loyal" to the national Democratic party, and segregationists Regulars, and on the outside with the National Democratic Party of Alabama, a mainly Black and liberal party.

In 1968, former Alabama Governor George C. Wallace ran for president as the nominee of the American Independent Party, except that in Alabama he was the "Democrat" nominee for president. Once again, the state party failed to support its pro Civil Rights nominee, Vice President Hubert Humphrey of Minnesota. By this time, the National Party then recognized a black-majority replacement party under the direction of African-American John L. Cashin, Jr. and seated his delegation at the 1968 convention under the name of the National Democratic Party of Alabama. Two years later, Cashin would unsuccessfully challenge Wallace election to a second term as governor.

After the 1970 Federal Census and Voting Rights legal challenges, the Alabama Legislature reapportioned itself for the first time in several decades. Part of the result was the creation of two black-majority House districts. These were the first minority-majority seats since black Republicans served in the legislature during Reconstruction (1868–1878). Democrats Thomas J. Reed and Fred Gray were elected as the first minority members in almost one hundred years.

=== The Wallace era ===
The personality and racial politics of Democratic governor George Wallace, dominated Alabama throughout the 1960s, 1970's, and until his retirement from elective office in 1986. He campaigned on shifting grounds as the circumstances warranted. Initially, he promised "segregation forever" to a white-dominated electorate in his successful 1962 campaign for governor. He was unable to seek a second consecutive term due to the state's then law that limited governors to "one-term and out." So in 1966, his wife Lurleen Wallace ran in his place and won a landslide victory in both the Democratic primary and the general election over Republican nominee, Congressman James D. Martin. However, she died in office in May, 1968 and was succeeded by the Lieutenant Governor, Albert P. Brewer. By this time the state's one term limit had been removed allowing Governor Brewer to seek a full-term. George Wallace then challenged him for re-election in 1970, and won a bitter and racially charged Democratic primary against Governor Albert P. Brewer. He won again in 1974 and then temporarily retired at the end of his third term in 1979. He returned to politics for one final campaign for governor in 1982 defeating the liberal Lt. Governor George McMillan in part by appealing to the very black voters he had so often mistreated even singing "We Shall Overcome" inside black churches and apologizing for his previous stands. As a result, he received more than 25% of the black vote in the Democratic primary. He defeated Republican Emory Folmar in the general election. His chameleon-like political re-inventions of himself effectively kept Alabama under nominal Democratic party control. This strategy worked long beyond what it did in many other southern states that had figured out how to accommodate their more racially inclusive electorates without blatant appeals to racism. However, one-party Democratic dominance finally ended in 1986 as the Alabama Republican Party won the Governorship with the election of Guy Hunt.

Earlier, in George Wallace's second term the three warring factions of the state Democratic party eventually reunited in the main party in 1972, and the regulars were returned to control of the delegation at the Democratic National Convention to which George Wallace spoke just weeks after he was gunned down by a would-be assassin.

=== The Post-Wallace era ===
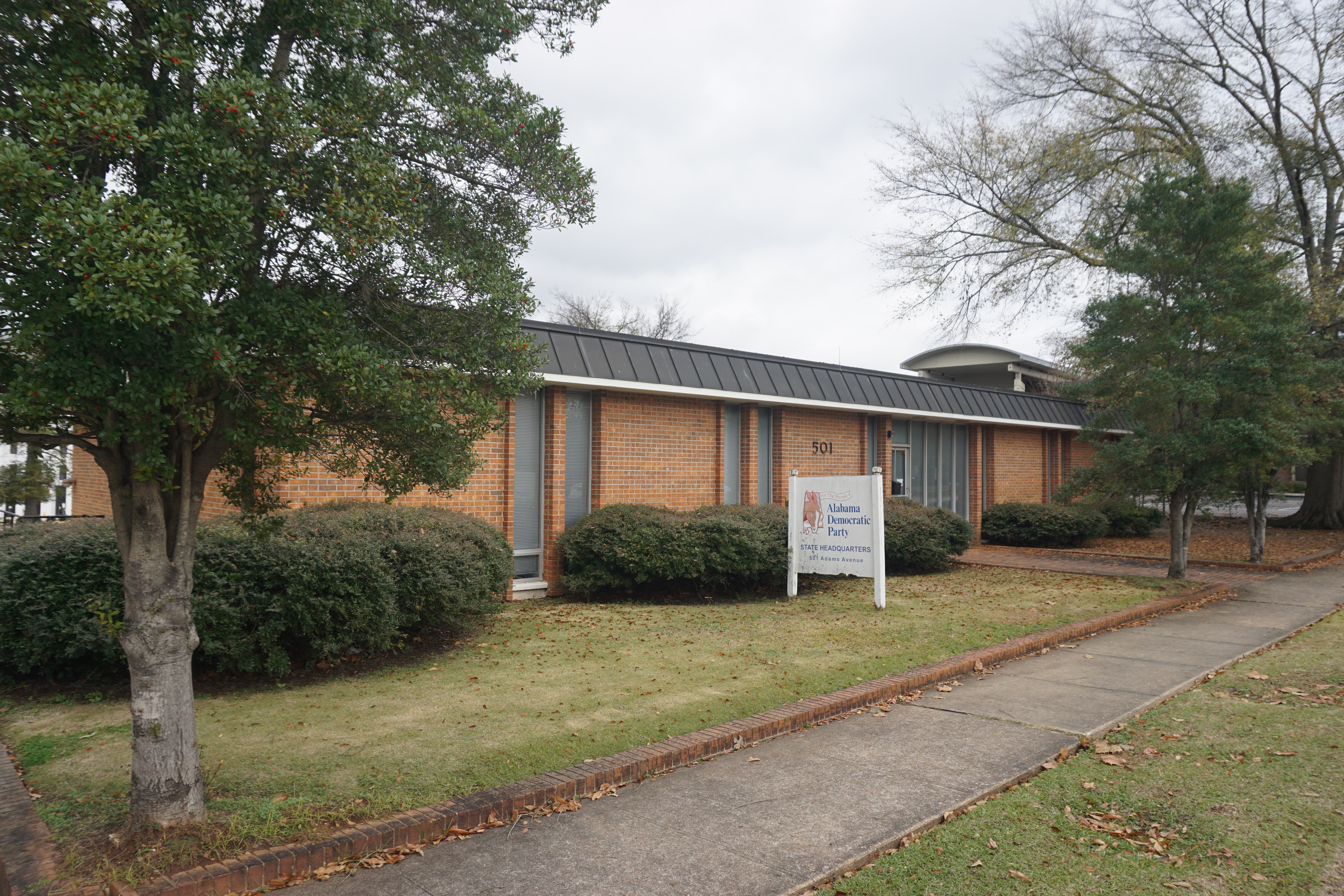
Alabama Democratic Party State Headquarters in Montgomery in 2018

The final retirement of George Wallace in 1986 opened a bitter struggle for succeeding him between several major figures in the Democratic Party. It included Lt. Governor Bill Baxley then serving under Wallace fourth term. He had also served as attorney general under Wallace's second and third terms. He had been a politically nimble figure who was considered to be both a "new south" southern liberal (he prosecuted the Sixteenth Street Church Bomber) and, yet, was also considered to be a friend and loyalist to Wallace. He also enjoyed the support of organized labor. The other major candidate was then retiring Attorney General Charles Graddick who before being elected as a statewide-Democrat, had previously been in the Republican Party. He was considered to represent the more conservative and business oriented wing of the Democratic party.

Charles Graddick defeated Bill Baxley in the Democratic runoff by about 8,000 votes. Baxley appealed his primary loss to the State Democratic Executive Committee on the basis that Graddick had called Republicans to "cross over" and "illegally" participate in the runoff after having voted in the Republican primary several weeks earlier. Despite no real evidence to support this conclusion, the Party leaders agreed and disqualified Graddick as the nominee. This forced the leadership to either hold another runoff or chose Baxley as the candidate for the Alabama gubernatorial election of 1986.

The controversial decision from the party leadership to run Baxley was deemed undemocratic by the electorate, leading to the landslide election of Guy Hunt, the first Republican to win the governor's race since Reconstruction. Including that election, Democrats have lost 8 of the last 9 Governor's races with the only win being in 1998 by Don Siegelman.

Since 1986, Democrats have lost more and more ground to the Republicans, finally, in 2010, losing control of the Alabama Legislature.

=== Nancy Worley era and 2018–2019 leadership dispute ===
In 2013, former Secretary of State Nancy Worley was elected chair of the ADP, formally stepping into the role after serving as vice-chair since 2007 and as interim chair since Mark Kennedy's 2013 resignation. Worley was supported in her position by vice-chair of Minority Affairs Joe L. Reed. She worked to restructure the finances of the ADP, but was criticized for reducing the ADP's financial support of general election candidates. When she ran for a second term in 2018, she was narrowly re-elected by the State Democratic Executive Committee against opponent Peck Fox, who was endorsed by then U.S. Senator Doug Jones. However, after the ADP refused to fund most Democratic candidates running for office in Alabama in 2018 (accompanied by a crushing defeat for all Democratic challengers on the ballot), several supporters of Fox's candidacy found fault with the conduct of the election and the credentials of several SDEC members who voted in the election, and took the dispute before the Democratic National Committee. The DNC subsequently suspended issued party-building funds (US$10,000 a month) to Alabama in September 2018.

The DNC's Rules and Bylaws Committee ruled in February 2019 that the ADP, within 90 days, should draw up new bylaws which comport to the DNC's standards for affirmative action and are more inclusive of Youth, LGBTQ, Asian American and Pacific Islander (AAPI), Latino and disabled Democrats. The RBC found fault with the ADP bylaws' stipulation that the vice-chair of Minority Affairs could select up to 30 at-large members to the SDEC; that the bylaws only provided for the SDEC membership to reflect the ethnic makeup of the Democratic voting base from the last general election, which almost entirely accommodated African-Americans; and that most of the at-large appointees were selected by Reed from the Alabama Democratic Conference, which Reed has chaired since 1979. The ADP did not respond to the RBC's ruling, and refused to respond to another 90-day extension of the ruling.

In August, DNC Chair Tom Perez issued a recommendation that the ADP's refusal to act should be met with the stripping of DNC voting credentials from Worley and Vice-chair Randy Kelley, and that refusal to approve DNC-compliant bylaws and hold new officer elections under the new bylaws would jeopardize the DNC's acceptance of the ADP's 2020 delegate selection plan and, hence, any representation from Alabama delegates to the 2020 Democratic National Convention. Worley attended the DNC Summer Meeting in San Francisco to protest the recommendation, asserting that the DNC's recommendations for more diverse representation on the SDEC was an attack on the African-American Democratic base. On August 23, the RBC and then the full DNC voted unanimously to strip credentials from Worley and Kelley.

On September 23, the RBC approved new proposed ADP bylaws which were written by Reps. Anthony Daniels, Napoleon Bracy Jr. and Christopher J. England in their capacity as members of the Alabama House Democratic Caucus and the Alabama House Black Caucus. The RBC ordered that the new bylaws should be passed by the SDEC within 10 days by October 5. Worley, in retaliation, called an SDEC meeting for October 12.

The October 5 meeting, which brought together 75 members of the SDEC, voted to approve the DNC-supported ADP bylaws, while over 80 other members who supported Worley and Kelley did not attend. Subsequently, the Worley-Kelley faction held an SDEC meeting on October 12 at which most of those who attended the October 5 meeting also attended to vote against Worley's proposed bylaws. The Worley-organized SDEC meeting overruled the October 5 meeting and bylaws, with Worley denying that she had received notice of a member-called meeting for October 5, and subsequently passed a non-DNC-approved draft of the bylaws which mostly consisted of the older text. However, the pro-DNC SDEC members vowed to hold their meeting on November 2 to elect new ADP leaders.

Worley filed a lawsuit against Daniels, Bracy and England on October 30 in Montgomery County Circuit Court to block the November 2 meeting from happening, with Judge Greg Griffin (D) issuing November 1 ruling to block the meeting. The block was immediately appealed to the all Republican Alabama Supreme Court, which issued a stay on the block by a vote of 8–0. On November 2, 107 members of the SDEC met in Montgomery under the October 5 bylaws in order to elect over 70 members from the ADP's Youth, LGBTQ, Asian American and Pacific Islander (AAPI) and Latino caucuses to the SDEC under an umbrella "Diversity Caucus", and the members unanimously voted to remove Worley and Kelley as chair and vice-chair. The members subsequently voted for State Rep. Christopher J. England as chair and Patricia Todd as vice-chair. Worley, who did not attend the meeting, disputed its validity and declared herself and Kelley as the rightful leaders of the party; in addition, most of the Worley-Kelley faction, including Reed's at-large appointees to the SDEC, did not attend the SDEC meeting. Additional legal action is still pending in front of Judge Griffin in the dispute. The England-Todd faction gained control of the ADP's website and social media pages by November 18. On December 20, Alabama Secretary of State John Merrill (R) certified England's signature of the Democratic list of people who filed as candidates for the 2020 election, establishing England as the de jure chair of the party. The controversial election and preceding events were the subject of a three-part series entitled "The Real Enemy," produced by Emmanuel Dzotsi for the podcast Reply All.

Following the 2018 legislative elections, there were only two white Democrats in the Alabama legislature, one in the State House of Representatives and one in the Alabama Senate. In the 2006–2010 term, more than 60 percent of legislators were Democrats, and most of the Democrats were white.

=== 2020s and continued influence of Joe L. Reed ===
In July 2022, England announced that he would not seek another term as chair of the Alabama Democratic Party. Candidates to replace England included former congressional nominee Tabitha Isner, Birmingham LGBTQ city liaison Josh Coleman, and former U.S. Senate candidate Brandaun Dean. Former U.S. representative Parker Griffith also expressed interest in the position, but said he would only compete for it if he was nominated by someone else. Ultimately, it was former party Vice Chair Randy Kelley who won the chairmanship. Isner was elected as Senior Vice Chair. Kelley had been endorsed by Joe L. Reed.

During an executive committee meeting in May 2023, the Alabama Democratic Party approved new bylaws that eliminated its youth, LGBTQ and disabled caucuses. All three of these caucuses are required for state Democratic parties by the Democratic National Committee. The powers of the affirmative action, Asian and Pacific Islander, and Native American caucuses were also greatly diminished. The move was described by Yellowhammer News and Alabama Reflector as a victory for Joe L. Reed and Randy Kelley. The disbandments were swiftly criticized by vice chair Tabitha Isner, as well as former U.S. Senator Doug Jones, the latter of whom described it as disenfranchisement for the affected groups. During the same meeting, nearly thirty committee members were forbidden from participating due to accusations of having not paid a $50 admission fee. Isner called the fee a poll tax. Reed charged that previous bylaws were "corrupt" and had taken power away from African-American voters. In reaction, the Alabama Political Reporter published an opinion column by journalist Josh Moon claiming that the controversy "might have buried the ADP for good". The chair of the Democratic National Committee, Jaime Harrison, tweeted that the situation was "troubling" and that it was being looked into.

In June 2023, the Democratic National Committee confirmed that it would be formally reviewing a complaint regarding the removal of the Alabama Democratic Party's diversity caucuses. The complaint was referred to the national committee's Rules and Bylaws Committee. When a follow-up meeting of the Alabama Democratic Party occurred on July 29, 2023, several party members protested the changes. In response, party leaders forbade recording devices from the meeting venue and removed several people from the premises, instead conducting the meeting in a private executive session. When Tabitha Isner disputed the removal of recording devices, noting that Alabama was a one-party consent state, Joe L. Reed reportedly shouted "You be quiet, girl" at her, according to the Alabama Reflector. Eddgra Fallin, a member of the state Democratic Executive Committee, later argued with protesters who had been removed from the meeting, saying that Black Democrats deserved more representation in the party, and that Hispanics "have not had to fight for anything". After the private executive session ended, Isner said that there had been an effort to remove her from the vice chair position, but the motion ultimately failed.

In October 2023, the Democratic National Committee's Rules and Bylaws Committee ordered that the Alabama Democratic Party's 2023 bylaws must be invalidated, and a new set of bylaws must be drafted by November 2023 and voted on by February 2024. The DNC found that chair Randy Kelley had not maintained a proper membership list for the State Democratic Executive Committee, and that prior notice had not been given for the $50 fee in May 2023.

== Emblems ==
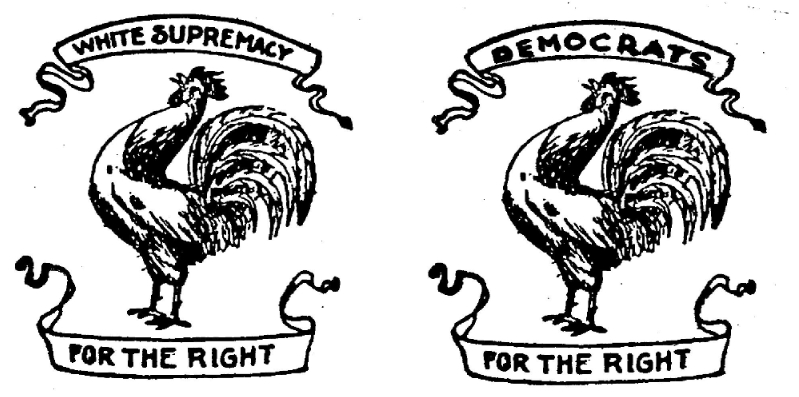
Logo of the Alabama Democratic Party, 1904–1966 (left) and 1966–1996 (right)

In 1904 the Alabama Democratic Party chose, as the logo to put on its ballots, a rooster with the motto "White supremacy – For the right." Some objected to the rooster, such as segregationist Senator J. Thomas Heflin, who found it "[failing] to impress the people with the dignity of the Democratic Party," preferring to use a woman holding the Constitution in scrolls upon which was marked "Here We Rest" without objecting to the motto itself.

The presence of "White Supremacy" on the Democratic logo and, as extension, on the ballots themselves, was used as a symbol of the Black disenfranchisement in the South and was criticized by former Republican presidential candidate Thomas E. Dewey for its use by the Stevenson—Sparkman ticket in the 1952 United States presidential election in Alabama.

In January 1966, over the objections of George Wallace and the Regulars, who feared the loss of White voters, the leadership decided, on a proposition from the Loyalists, helped by Charles W. McKay, the author of the "Nullification Declaration" against the Brown decision, who wanted to attract Black voters recently enfranchised by the Voting Rights Act of 1965, to replace "White supremacy" with "Democrats."

Thirty years later, in 1996, the party finally dropped the rooster, citing racist and white supremacist connotations linked with the symbol.

== Chronology of leadership ==
=== Chronology of Chairs ===
- 1955–1966: Roy Mayhall
- 1966–1977: Bob Vance
- 1977–1980: George Lewis Bailes
- 1980–1984: Jimmy Knight
- 1984–1991: John Baker
- 1991–1992: Jack Hurley
- 1992–1996: Bill Blount
- 1996–1998: Joe Turnham
- 1998–2001: Jack Miller
- 2001–2005: Redding Pitt
- 2005–2011: Joe Turnham
- 2011–2013: Mark Kennedy
- 2013–2019: Nancy Worley
- 2019–2022: Christopher J. England
- 2022–2026: Randy Kelley
- 2026–present: Bobby Singleton

=== Vice-Chairs ===
- Pat Edington (1979–1991)
- Amy Burks (1991–2007)
- Nancy Worley (2007–2013)
- Redding Pitt (2013–2016)
- Randy Kelley (2016–2019)
- Patricia Todd (2019–2022)
- Tabitha Isner (2022–2026)
- Caroline Self (2026–present)

=== Chronology of Executive Directors ===
- 1971–1983: Louise Lindblom
- 1983–1997: Al LaPierre
- 1998–2000: Giles Perkins
- 2000-2000: Wade Perry
- 2000–2001: Phillip Kinney
- 2001–2003: Marsha Folsom
- 2003–2004: Mike Kanarick
- 2004–2011: Jim Spearman
- 2011–2013: Bradley Davidson
- 2019-2020: Ralph Young
- 2020–2022: Wade Perry
- 2023–2025: Tom Miro
- 2025-present: Mark Onorato

== Election Results ==
=== Federal ===
==== U.S. House ====
Election	Votes	%	Seats (AL)	±	%
2016	621,911	32.91	1 / 7	0	2.22
2018	678,687	40.89	1 / 7	0	7.95
2020	608,809	29.67	1 / 7	0	11.22
2022	318,540	23.71	1 / 7	0	5.96
2024	517,881	25.29	2 / 7	▲1	1.58
2026	763,464	45.49	2 / 7	0	20.20

== See also ==
- Political party strength in Alabama
- List of state parties of the Democratic Party (United States)
- Alabama Republican Party
