= 2024 Alabama Republican presidential primary =

- March 5, 2024

50 Republican National Convention delegates

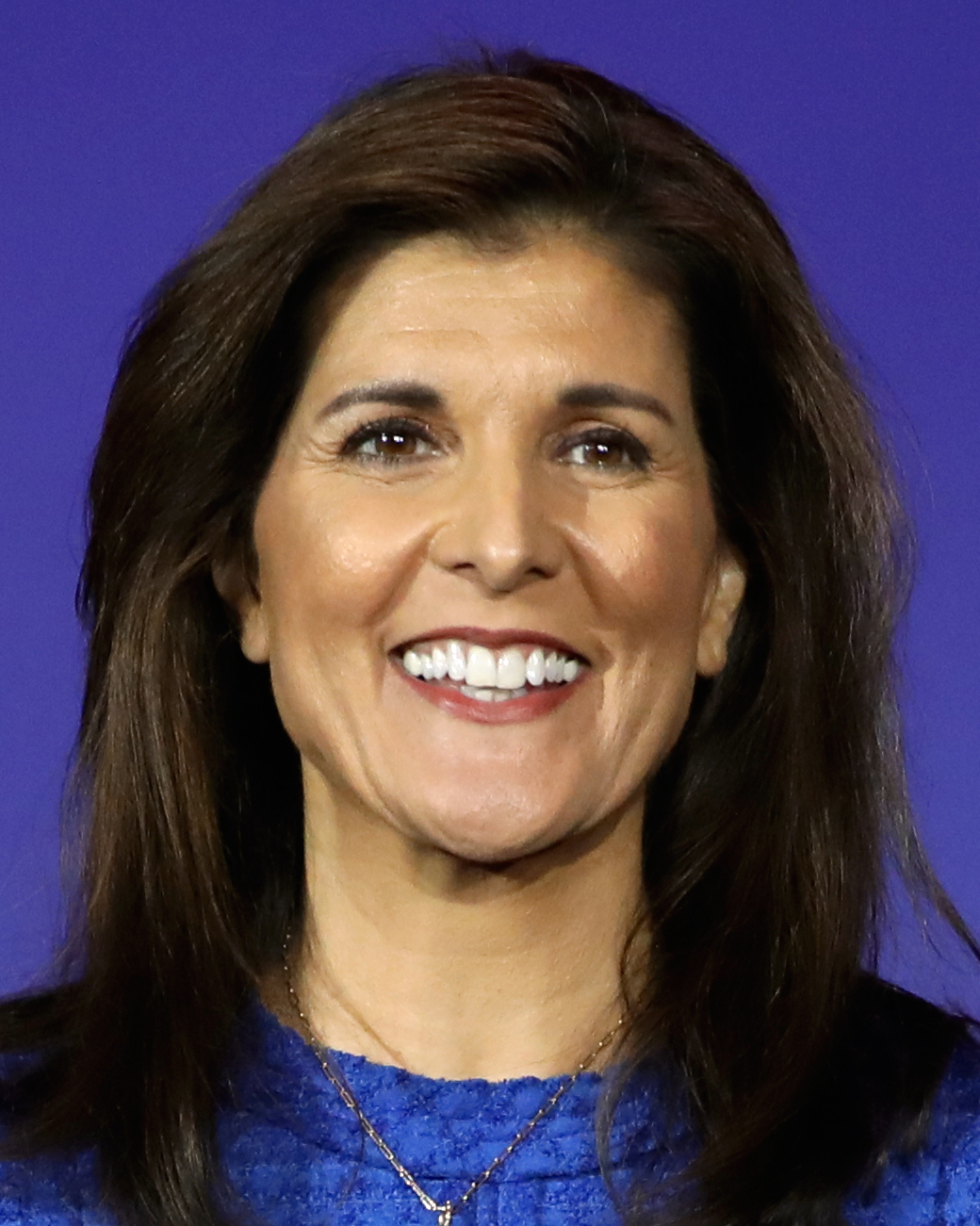
Candidate	Donald Trump	Nikki Haley
Home state	Florida	South Carolina
Estimated delegate count	50	0
Popular vote	499,147	77,989
Percentage	83.20%	13.00%

Trump
20–30%
30–40%
40–50%
50–60%
60–70%
70–80%
80–90%
90–100%
Haley
40–50%
50–60%
60–70%
70–80%
80–90%
90–100%
Uncommitted
90–100%
Christie
90–100%
Other
10-20% tie
30-40% tie
50% tie
No votes

The 2024 Alabama Republican presidential primary was held on March 5, 2024, as part of the Republican Party primaries for the 2024 presidential election. 50 delegates to the 2024 Republican National Convention were allocated on a winner-take-most basis. The contest was held on Super Tuesday alongside primaries in 14 other states.

== Background ==
In the 2016 Republican presidential contest, Donald Trump won the Alabama primary with 42.4% of the vote, with his nearest opponent, Senator Ted Cruz, taking 21.1% of the vote.

=== Republican electorate ===
The Alabama Republican Party electorate is predominantly evangelical. In 2012, an estimated 80% of Alabama Republican primary voters were affiliated with evangelical Christianity. In the 2008 and 2012 Alabama Republican presidential primaries, social conservative candidates Mike Huckabee and Rick Santorum, respectively, won by dominating the evangelical vote.

== Candidates ==
The filing deadline for the Alabama primary was on November 10, 2023. The state Republican Party published the following list of qualified candidates:

- Ryan Binkley (withdrawn)
- Doug Burgum (withdrawn)
- Chris Christie (withdrawn)
- Ron DeSantis (withdrawn)
- Nikki Haley
- Vivek Ramaswamy (withdrawn)
- Tim Scott (withdrawn)
- David Stuckenberg
- Donald Trump
- Uncommitted

== Campaign ==
Donald Trump's 2024 presidential campaign was endorsed by Alabama's senior senator Tommy Tuberville in November 2022. Former Vice President Mike Pence spoke before the University of Alabama's Young Americans for Freedom chapter in April 2023 prior to his campaign launch.

=== Debate ===
The fourth Republican primary debate was held on December 6, 2023, at the University of Alabama. Hosted by NewsNation and The Washington Free Beacon, it was moderated by Megyn Kelly, Elizabeth Vargas, and Eliana Johnson. Four candidates attended the debate: Ron DeSantis, Nikki Haley, Chris Christie, and Vivek Ramaswamy. This was the last debate to feature Christie and Ramaswamy, Christie would suspend his campaign before voting started, and Ramaswamy the night of Iowa.

== Endorsements ==
Ron DeSantis (withdrawn)

Former U.S. Representative

- Mo Brooks, AL-05 (2011–2023); candidate for U.S. Senate in 2017 and 2022

State executive official

- Andrew Sorrell, State Auditor (2023–present); member of the Alabama House of Representatives from District 3 (2018–2022)

State legislators

- Larry Stutts, Alabama State Senator from District 6 (2014–present)
- David Faulkner, Alabama State Representative from District 46 (2014–present)
Mike Pence (withdrawn)

Notable individual

- Quin Hillyer, conservative newspaper columnist and writer; candidate for AL-01 in 2013
Donald Trump

U.S. Senators

- Katie Britt (2023–present)
- Tommy Tuberville (2021–present)

U.S. Representatives

- Robert Aderholt, AL-04 (1997–present)
- Jerry Carl, AL-01 (2021–present)
- Barry Moore, AL-02 (2021–present)
- Gary Palmer, AL-06 (2015–present)
- Mike Rogers, AL-03 (2003–present)
- Dale Strong, AL-05 (2023–present)

State executive officials

- Will Ainsworth, Lieutenant Governor (2019–present)
- Chris Beeker, member of the Alabama Public Service Commission from Place 2 (2015–present)
- Twinkle Andress Cavanaugh, president of the Alabama Public Service Commission (2013–present) and member of the Alabama Public Service Commission (2011–present)
- Jeremy H. Oden, member of the Alabama Public Service Commission from Place 1 (2013–present)
- Rick Pate, Agriculture Commissioner (2019–present)

Party officials

- John Wahl, chair of the Alabama Republican Party (2021–present)

Organizations

- Alabama Republican Party

== Results ==
Alabama Republican primary, March 5, 2024
Candidate	Votes	Percentage	Actual delegate count		
Candidate	Votes	Percentage	Bound	Unbound	Total
Donald Trump	499,147	83.20%	50	0	50
Nikki Haley	77,989	13.00%	0	0	0
Uncommitted	9,807	1.63%	0	0	0
Ron DeSantis (withdrawn)	8,452	1.41%	0	0	0
Vivek Ramaswamy (withdrawn)	1,864	0.31%	0	0	0
Chris Christie (withdrawn)	1,442	0.24%	0	0	0
David Stuckenberg	752	0.13%	0	0	0
Ryan Binkley	509	0.08%	0	0	0
Total:	599,962	100.00%	50	0	50

== Polling ==
Poll source	Date(s) administered	Sample size (Note: Key: A – all adults RV – registered voters LV – likely voters V – unclear)	Margin of error	Ron DeSantis	Nikki Haley	Donald Trump	Other	Undecided
Cygnal/Alabama Daily News	Jan 29–30, 2024	515 (LV)	± 4.31%	–	16%	76%	–	8%
Public Opinion Strategies (Note: Poll sponsored by Alabama Families for Great Schools)	Jan 15–17, 2023	500 (LV)	± 4.38%	50%	–	31%	–	19%
Public Opinion Strategies	Jan 15–17, 2023	500 (LV)	± 4.38%	53%	–	35%	–	12%
Cygnal/Alabama Daily News	Oct 27–29, 2022	616 (LV)	± 3.94%	36%	1%	50%	5%	8%

== See also ==
- 2024 Alabama Democratic presidential primary
- 2024 Republican Party presidential primaries
- 2024 United States presidential election
- 2024 United States presidential election in Alabama
- 2024 United States elections

== Notes ==
Partisan clients
