= 2010 Alabama elections =

- November 2, 2010

Elections were held in Alabama on Tuesday, November 2, 2010. Primary elections were held on June 1, 2010, with the run-off on July 13.

The 2010 elections were historic for Republicans in that it won majorities of both chambers of Alabama's State Legislature and swept all statewide races on the ballot; Democrats had held majorities in both of Alabama's state legislative chambers since 1874.

== Federal ==
=== United States Senate ===
The nominees were incumbent Richard Shelby (Republican) and attorney William G. Barnes (Democratic).

=== United States House ===
All seven Alabama seats in the United States House of Representatives were up for election in 2010.

== Governor ==
Incumbent Governor Bob Riley was ineligible for re-election due to term limits.

2010 Alabama gubernatorial election
Party	Candidate	Votes	%
Republican	Robert J. Bentley	860,472	57.59%
Democratic	Ron Sparks	625,710	41.87%
Write-in		8,091	0.54%
Total votes		1,494,273	100%
Republican hold			

== Lieutenant governor ==
Incumbent Democratic Lieutenant Governor Jim Folsom Jr. lost to Republican Treasurer Kay Ivey.

2010 Alabama lieutenant gubernatorial election
Party	Candidate	Votes	%
Republican	Kay Ivey	764,112	51.47%
Democratic	Jim Folsom Jr. (incumbent)	718,636	48.40%
Write-in		1,945	0.13%
Total votes		1,484,693	100%
Republican gain from Democratic			

== Secretary of State ==
2010 Alabama Secretary of State election

Nominee	Beth Chapman	Scott Gilliland
Party	Republican	Democratic
Popular vote	904,021	546,131
Percentage	62.30%	37.63%
- County results Chapman: 50–60% 60–70% 70–80% 80–90% Gilliland: 50–60% 60–70% 70–80% 80–90%
Secretary of State before election
Beth Chapman
Republican
Elected Secretary of State
Beth Chapman
Republican

Incumbent Secretary of State Beth Chapman was successful in her bid for a second term.

=== Republican nominee ===
- Beth Chapman, incumbent

=== Democratic nominee ===
- Scott Gilliland, attorney from Vestavia Hills

=== General Election ===
==== Endorsements ====
Beth Chapman (R)

Politicians

- Sarah Palin, former governor of Alaska (2006–2009) and 2008 Republican vice presidential nominee.

Organizations

- Alabama Citizens for Life
- Alabama Farmers Federation
- Alabama Retail Association
- Alabama Association of Realtors
- Alabama State Employees Association
- National Fraternal Order of Police, Alabama chapter
- Business Council of Alabama
- NRA Political Victory Fund
- Susan B. Anthony List
Scott Gilliland (D)

Organizations

- Alabama AFL-CIO
- Alabama New South Coalition
- Communications Workers of America
- International Brotherhood of Boilermakers

Newspapers

- The Birmingham News

==== Results ====
2010 Alabama Secretary of State election
Party	Candidate	Votes	%
Republican	Beth Chapman (incumbent)	904,021	62.30%
Democratic	Scott Gilliland	546,131	37.63%
Write-in		981	0.07%
Total votes		1,451,133	100%

== Attorney general ==
2010 Alabama Attorney General election
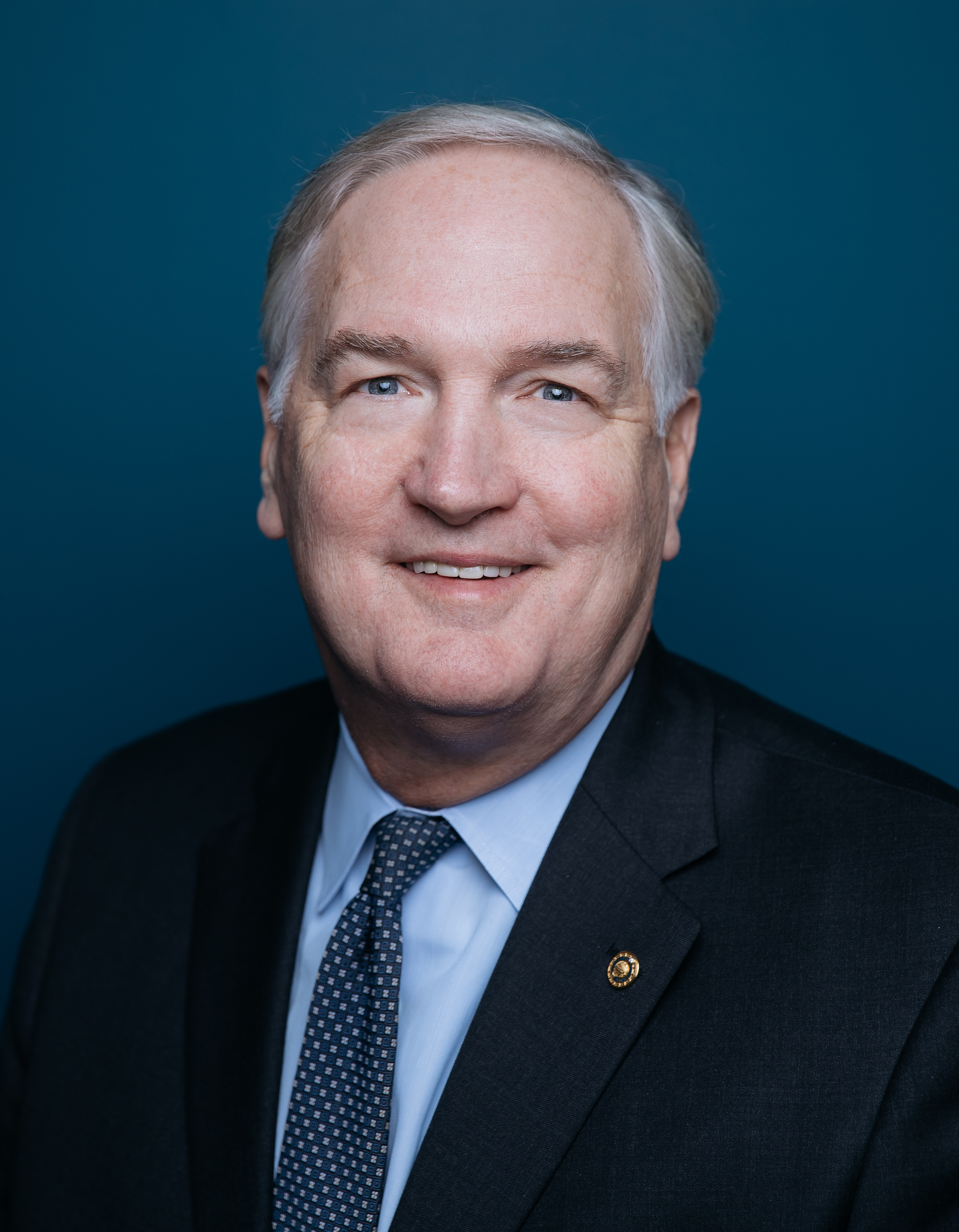

Nominee	Luther Strange	James Anderson
Party	Republican	Democratic
Popular vote	868,520	606,270
Percentage	58.84%	41.07%
- County results Strange: 50–60% 60–70% 70–80% Anderson: 50–60% 60–70% 70–80% 80–90%
Attorney General before election
Troy King
Republican
Elected Attorney General
Luther Strange
Republican

Incumbent Attorney General Troy King lost his re-election bid in the Republican primary to Luther Strange.

=== Republican primary ===
==== Candidates ====
- Luther Strange, attorney from Birmingham and Republican nominee for lieutenant governor in 2006
- Troy King, incumbent

==== Endorsements ====
Troy King

Organizations

- Alabama Farmers Federation
- Alabama Fraternal Order of Police
- Birmingham Fraternal Order of Police
Luther Strange

Federal officials

- Jeff Sessions and Richard Shelby, U.S. senators from Alabama

State officials

- Bob Riley, governor of Alabama

Local officials

- Robby Owens, Shelby County district attorney
- Richard Minor, St. Clair County district attorney
- Robert Broussard, Madison County district attorney
- Wilson Blaylock, Cullman County district attorney
- Randall Houston, district attorney for Elmore, Autauga and Chilton counties

Individuals

- Dan Ireland, baptist minister.

Newspapers

- The Birmingham News

==== Results ====
Republican primary results
Party	Candidate	Votes	%
Republican	Luther Strange	284,853	60.13%
Republican	Troy King (incumbent)	188,874	39.87%
Total votes		473,727	100%

=== Democratic primary ===
==== Candidates ====
- Giles Perkins, attorney from Birmingham
- Michel Nicrosi, former assistant United States Attorney from Mobile
- James Anderson, attorney from Montgomery

==== First round endorsements ====
Giles Perkins

Organizations

- United Auto Workers CAP Council

State officials

- Demetrius Newton, speaker pro tempore of the Alabama House of Representatives
Michel Nicrosi

Organizations

- Alabama New South Coalition
James Anderson

Organizations

- Alabama Democratic Conference

Newspapers

- Opelika-Auburn News
- The Daily Home

==== First round results ====
Democratic primary results
Party	Candidate	Votes	%
Democratic	James Anderson	136,807	49.60%
Democratic	Giles Perkins	85,847	31.12%
Democratic	Michel Nicrosi	53,171	19.28%
Total votes		275,825	100%

==== Runoff endorsements ====
Giles Perkins

Politicians

- Howard Dean, former governor of Vermont (1991–2003) and former DNC chair (2005–2009)

Organizations

- Alabama New South Coalition

Newspapers

- The Anniston Star
- TimesDaily
James Anderson

Newspapers

- The Birmingham News

==== Runoff results ====
Democratic primary runoff results
Party	Candidate	Votes	%
Democratic	James Anderson	70,315	60.03%
Democratic	Giles Perkins	46,814	39.97%
Total votes		117,129	100%

=== General election ===
==== Endorsements ====
Luther Strange (R)

Politicians

- Ken Cuccinelli, attorney general of Virginia
- Mitt Romney, former governor of Massachusetts (2003–2007) and 2008 Republican presidential candidate

Organizations

- Alabama Citizens for Life
- Alabama Farmers Federation
- Alabama Retail Association
- National Federation of Independent Business

Newspapers

- The Huntsville Times
James Anderson (D)

Organizations

- Alabama AFL-CIO
- Alabama New South Coalition
- Communications Workers of America
- International Brotherhood of Boilermakers
- Alabama Fraternal Order of Police

Newspapers

- The Birmingham News

==== Results ====
2010 Alabama Attorney General election
Party	Candidate	Votes	%
Republican	Luther Strange	868,520	58.84%
Democratic	James Anderson	606,270	41.07%
Write-in		1,285	0.09%
Total votes		1,476,075	100%
Republican hold			

== State Treasurer ==
2010 Alabama State Treasurer election
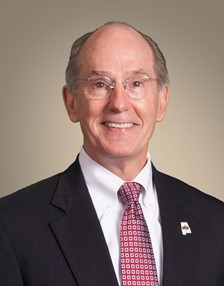

Nominee	Young Boozer	Charley Grimsley
Party	Republican	Democratic
Popular vote	875,965	581,930
Percentage	60.04%	39.89%
- County results Boozer: 50–60% 60–70% 70–80% 80–90% Grimsley: 50–60% 60–70% 70–80% 80–90%
Treasurer before election
Kay Ivey
Republican
Elected Treasurer
Young Boozer
Republican

Incumbent Treasurer Kay Ivey did not seek re-election and instead ran successfully for lieutenant governor after initially eyeing the governor's seat.

=== Republican primary ===
==== Candidates ====
- George Wallace Jr., former state treasurer of Alabama (1987–1995) and son of George Wallace
- Young Boozer, former banker from Montgomery

==== Endorsements ====
George Wallace Jr.

Organizations

- Alabama Farmers Federation
- Alabama Republican Assembly

==== Results ====
Republican primary results
Party	Candidate	Votes	%
Republican	Young Boozer	305,467	64.76%
Republican	George Wallace Jr.	166,206	35.24%
Total votes		471,673	100%

=== Democratic primary ===
==== Candidates ====
- Jeremy Sherer, attorney from Birmingham
- Charley Grimsley, former state Conservation Commissioner (1993–1995)

==== Endorsements ====
Jeremy Sherer

Organizations

- Alabama New South Coalition
Charley Grimsley

Organizations

- Alabama Democratic Conference
- Save Alabama PACT

==== Results ====
Democratic primary results
Party	Candidate	Votes	%
Democratic	Charley Grimsley	159,141	59.94%
Democratic	Jeremy Sherer	106,356	40.06%
Total votes		265,497	100%

=== General election ===
==== Endorsements ====
Young Boozer (R)

Individuals

- Mitt Romney, former governor of Massachusetts (2003–2007) and 2008 Republican presidential candidate

Organizations

- Alabama Farmers Federation
- Alabama Retail Association

Newspapers

- The Birmingham News
Charlie Grimsley (D)

Organizations

- Alabama AFL-CIO
- Alabama New South Coalition
- Communications Workers of America
- International Brotherhood of Boilermakers
- Alabama State Employees Association
- Conservative Christians of Alabama

==== Results ====
2010 Alabama State Treasurer election
Party	Candidate	Votes	%
Republican	Young Boozer	875,965	60.04%
Democratic	Charley Grimsley	581,930	39.89%
Write-in		1,030	0.07%
Total votes		1,458,925	100%
Republican hold			

== Auditor ==
2010 Alabama State Auditor election

Nominee	Samantha Shaw	Miranda Joseph
Party	Republican	Democratic
Popular vote	893,229	531,233
Percentage	62.65%	37.26%
- County results Shaw: 50–60% 60–70% 70–80% 80–90% Joseph: 50–60% 60–70% 70–80% 80–90%
Auditor before election
Samantha Shaw
Republican
Elected Auditor
Samantha Shaw
Republican

Incumbent Auditor Samantha Shaw was successful in her bid for a second term.

=== Republican nominee ===
- Samantha Shaw, incumbent

=== Democratic nominee ===
- Miranda Joseph, certified internal auditor

=== General election ===
==== Endorsements ====
Samantha Shaw (R)

Organizations

- Alabama Farmers Federation
- Alabama Retail Association
- Alabama State Employees Association

Newspapers

- The Birmingham News
Miranda Joseph (D)

Organizations

- Alabama AFL-CIO
- Alabama New South Coalition
- Communications Workers of America
- International Brotherhood of Boilermakers

==== Results ====
2010 Alabama State Auditor election
Party	Candidate	Votes	%
Republican	Samantha Shaw (incumbent)	893,229	62.65%
Democratic	Miranda Joseph	531,233	37.26%
Write-in		1,301	0.09%
Total votes		1,425,763	100%

== Commissioner of Agriculture & Industries ==
2010 Alabama Commissioner of Agriculture and Industries election

Nominee	John McMillan	Glen Zorn
Party	Republican	Democratic
Popular vote	862,901	583,255
Percentage	59.61%	40.29%
- County results McMillan: 50–60% 60–70% 70–80% 80–90% Zorn: 50–60% 60–70% 70–80% 80–90%
Commissioner before election
Ron Sparks
Democratic
Elected Commissioner
John McMillan
Republican

Incumbent Democratic Commissioner Ron Sparks was term-limited and unsuccessfully ran for governor.

=== Republican primary ===
==== Candidates ====
- Dorman Grace, farmer
- Dale Peterson, farmer and businessman
- John McMillan, former state Conservation Commissioner (1980–1983)

==== First round endorsements ====
Dorman Grace

Organizations

- Alabama Farmers Federation
John McMillan

Organizations

- Alabama Association of Realtors
- Alabama Retail Association

==== First round results ====
Republican primary results
Party	Candidate	Votes	%
Republican	John McMillan	151,177	36.53%
Republican	Dorman Grace	145,524	35.17%
Republican	Dale Peterson	117,091	28.30%
Total votes		413,792	100%

==== Runoff endorsements ====
John McMillan

Individuals

- Dale Peterson, Republican candidate in the first round

==== Runoff results ====
Runoff results by county McMillan: 50–60%; 60–70%; 70–80%; 80–90%; Grace: 50–60%; 60–70%; 70–80%; 80–90%

Republican primary runoff results
Party	Candidate	Votes	%
Republican	John McMillan	216,824	51.90%
Republican	Dorman Grace	200,959	48.10%
Total votes		417,783	100%

=== Democratic nominee ===
- Glen Zorn, farmer and businessman

=== General election ===
==== Endorsements ====
John McMillan (R)

Politicians

- Mitt Romney, former governor of Massachusetts (2003–2007) and 2008 Republican presidential candidate

Organizations

- Alabama Citizens for Life
- Alabama Farmers Federation
- Alabama Grocers Association
Glen Zorn (D)

Organizations

- Alabama AFL-CIO
- Alabama New South Coalition
- Communications Workers of America
- International Brotherhood of Boilermakers
- Alabama State Employees Association

==== Results ====
2010 Alabama Commissioner of Agriculture & Industries election
Party	Candidate	Votes	%
Republican	John McMillan	862,901	59.61%
Democratic	Glen Zorn	583,255	40.29%
Write-in		1,405	0.10%
Total votes		1,447,561	100%
Republican gain from Democratic			

== Public Service Commissioner ==
Republicans flipped both seats, defeating incumbent Democrats and regaining majority.

=== Place 1 ===
2010 Alabama Public Service Commission Place 1 election
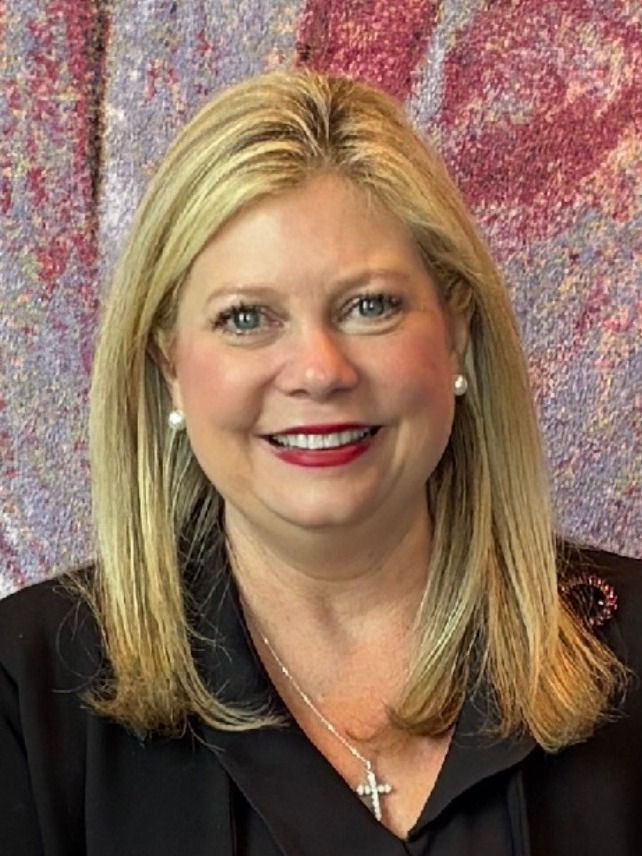

Candidate	Twinkle Andress Cavanaugh	Jan Cook
Party	Republican	Democratic
Popular vote	819,652	632,023
Percentage	56.41%	43.49%
- County results Cavanaugh: 50–60% 60–70% 70–80% Cook: 50–60% 60–70% 70–80% 80–90%
Commissioner before election
Jan Cook
Democratic
Elected Commissioner
Twinkle Andress Cavanaugh
Republican

==== Democratic nominee ====
- Jan Cook, incumbent

==== Republican primary ====
===== Candidates =====
- Stephen Evans, retirement plan adviser
- Chip Beeker, former Greene County commission chairman
- Twinkle Andress Cavanaugh, former Alabama Republican Party chairwoman and Republican candidate for PSC President in 2008

===== First round endorsements =====
Chip Beeker

Organizations

- Alabama Republican Assembly

===== First round results =====
Republican primary results
Party	Candidate	Votes	%
Republican	Twinkle Andress Cavanaugh	199,543	49.38%
Republican	Stephen Evans	104,492	25.86%
Republican	Chip Beeker	100,070	24.76%
Total votes		404,105	100%

===== Runoff results =====
Republican primary runoff results
Party	Candidate	Votes	%
Republican	Twinkle Andress Cavanaugh	253,165	61.75%
Republican	Stephen Evans	156,846	38.25%
Total votes		410,011	100%

==== General election ====
===== Endorsements =====
Jan Cook (D)

Organizations

- Alabama Farmers Federation
- Alabama AFL-CIO
- Alabama New South Coalition
- Alabama State Employees Association

===== Results =====
2010 Alabama Public Service Commission Place 1 election
Party	Candidate	Votes	%
Republican	Twinkle Andress Cavanaugh	819,652	56.41%
Democratic	Jan Cook (incumbent)	632,023	43.49%
Write-in		1,491	0.10%
Total votes		1,453,166	100%
Republican gain from Democratic			

=== Place 2 ===
2010 Alabama Public Service Commission Place 2 election
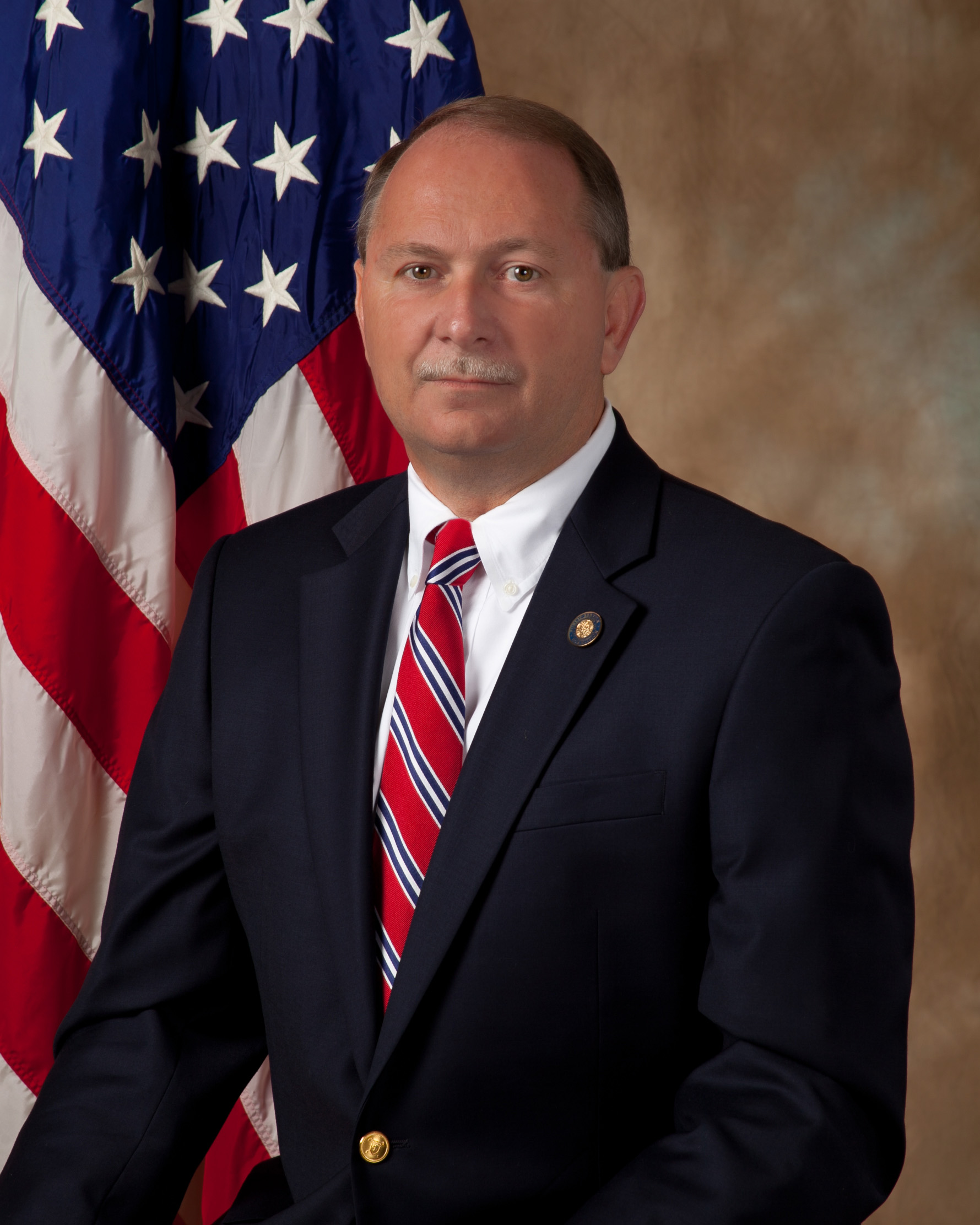

Candidate	Terry Dunn	Susan Parker
Party	Republican	Democratic
Popular vote	785,305	642,579
Percentage	54.96%	44.98%
- County results Dunn: 50–60% 60–70% 70–80% Parker: 50–60% 60–70% 70–80% 80–90%
Commissioner before election
Susan Parker
Democratic
Elected Commissioner
Terry Dunn
Republican

==== Democratic nominee ====
- Susan Parker, incumbent

==== Republican primary ====
===== Candidates =====
- Terry Dunn, general contractor
- Chip Brown, real estate agent

===== Results =====
Primary results by county Dunn: 50–60%; 60–70%; 70–80%; Brown: 50–60%; 60–70%

Republican primary results
Party	Candidate	Votes	%
Republican	Terry Dunn	186,628	51.60%
Republican	Chip Brown	175,060	48.40%
Total votes		361,688	100%

==== General election ====
===== Endorsements =====
Susan Parker (D)

Organizations

- Alabama Farmers Federation
- Alabama AFL-CIO
- Alabama New South Coalition
- Alabama State Employees Association
Terry Dunn (R)

Individuals

- Karl Rove, political consultant and former White House Deputy Chief of Staff (2001–2007)

===== Results =====
2010 Alabama Public Service Commission Place 2 election
Party	Candidate	Votes	%
Republican	Terry Dunn	785,305	54.96%
Democratic	Susan Parker (incumbent)	642,579	44.98%
Write-in		901	0.06%
Total votes		1,428,785	100%
Republican gain from Democratic			

== State Board of Education ==
Republicans flipped one district.

State Office	Party	Incumbent	Status	Party	Candidate	Votes	%
District 2	Republican	Betty Peters		Republican	Betty Peters	108,974	60.9%
District 2	Republican	Betty Peters		Democratic	Betty Letlow	69,951	39.1%
District 4	Democratic	Ethel Hall		Democratic	Yvette Richardson	96,175	63.8%
District 4	Democratic	Ethel Hall		Republican	Tom Dooley	54,427	36.1%
District 6	Republican	David Byers		Republican	Charles Elliott	153,057	78.0%
District 6	Republican	David Byers		Democratic	Kimberly Harbin Drake	43,046	21.9%
District 8	Democratic	Mary Jane Caylor		Republican	Mary Scott Hunter	122,547	63.0%
District 8	Democratic	Mary Jane Caylor		Democratic	Mary Ruth Yates	71,796	36.9%

== State Legislature ==
=== State Senate ===
All 35 seats of the Alabama Senate were up for election in 2010.

Prior to the election the Democrats held a 20–14 edge; after the election the GOP captured control 22–12 (one seat vacant).

=== State House of Representatives ===
All 105 seats in the Alabama House of Representatives were up for election in 2010.

Prior to the election the Democrats had a 60–44 edge; after the election the GOP took control 62–42 (one seat vacant).

== State Supreme Court ==
Three seats on the Supreme Court of Alabama were up for election in 2010.

=== Associate Justice, Place 1 ===
Incumbent Justice Patricia M. Smith chose not to seek re-election and retired at the end of her term.

==== Republican nominee ====
- Alisa Kelli Wise, Alabama Court of Criminal Appeals judge

==== Democratic nominee ====
- Rhonda Chambers, attorney from Birmingham

==== General election ====
===== Endorsements =====
Alisa Kelli Wise (R)

Organizations

- Alabama Farmers Federation
- Alabama Retail Association
- Alabama State Employees Association
- Alabama Civil Justice Reform Committee

Newspapers

- The Birmingham News
Rhonda Chambers (D)

Organizations

- Alabama AFL-CIO

===== Results =====
Results by county Wise: 40–50%; 50–60%; 60–70%; 70–80%; 80–90%; Chambers: 50–60%; 60–70%; 70–80%; 80–90%

2010 Alabama Supreme Court Associate Justice Place 1 election
Party	Candidate	Votes	%
Republican	Alisa Kelli Wise	912,463	62.87%
Democratic	Rhonda Chambers	537,670	37.05%
Write-in		1,169	0.08%
Total votes		1,451,302	100%
Republican hold			

=== Associate Justice, Place 2 ===
Incumbent Justice Michael F. Bolin chose to run for re-election.

==== Republican primary ====
===== Candidates =====
- Michael F. Bolin, incumbent
- Tracy Cary, attorney from Dothan

===== Primary endorsements =====
Michael F. Bolin

Organizations

- Alabama Farmers Federation
- Alabama Republican Assembly
- Alabama Civil Justice Reform Committee

===== Primary results =====
Republican primary results
Party	Candidate	Votes	%
Republican	Michael F. Bolin (incumbent)	288,371	69.44%
Republican	Tracy Cary	126,891	30.56%
Total votes		415,262	100%

==== Democratic nominee ====
- Tom Edwards, lawyer from Montgomery

==== General election ====
===== Endorsements =====
Michael F. Bolin (R)

Organizations

- Alabama Retail Association
- Alabama State Employees Association

Newspapers

- The Birmingham News
Tom Edwards (D)

Organizations

- Alabama AFL-CIO
- Alabama New South Coalition

===== Results =====
Results by county Bolin: 50–60%; 60–70%; 70–80%; 80–90%; Edwards: 50–60%; 60–70%; 70–80%; 80–90%

2010 Alabama Supreme Court Associate Justice Place 2 election
Party	Candidate	Votes	%
Republican	Michael F. Bolin (incumbent)	907,234	62.73%
Democratic	Tom Edwards	537,966	37.20%
Write-in		1,080	0.07%
Total votes		1,446,280	100%

=== Associate Justice, Place 3 ===
Incumbent Justice Tom Parker chose to run for re-election.

==== Republican primary ====
===== Candidates =====
- Tom Parker, incumbent
- Eric Johnston, law practitioner from Birmingham
- James Houts, chief assistant district attorney for Autauga, Elmore and Chilton counties

===== Primary endorsements =====
Tom Parker

Organizations

- Alabama Farmers Federation
Eric Johnston

Organizations

- Alabama Civil Justice Reform Committee

===== Primary results =====
Republican primary results
Party	Candidate	Votes	%
Republican	Tom Parker (incumbent)	239,458	60.24%
Republican	Eric Johnston	113,782	28.63%
Republican	James Houts	44,259	11.13%
Total votes		397,499	100%

==== Democratic nominee ====
- Mac Parsons, Jefferson County circuit judge

==== General election ====
===== Endorsements =====
Mac Parsons (D)

Organizations

- Alabama AFL-CIO
- Alabama State Employees Association

Newspapers

- The Birmingham News

===== Results =====
Results by county Parker: 50–60%; 60–70%; 70–80%; Parsons: 50–60%; 60–70%; 70–80%; 80–90%

2010 Alabama Supreme Court Associate Justice Place 3 election
Party	Candidate	Votes	%
Republican	Tom Parker (incumbent)	849,323	58.89%
Democratic	Mac Parsons	591,678	41.03%
Write-in		1,155	0.08%
Total votes		1,442,156	100%

== State Appellate Court ==
Two seats from the state appellate courts in Alabama were up for election, with one of them being contested.

=== Court of Civil Appeals ===
==== Republican nominee ====
- Tommy Bryan, incumbent

==== Democratic nominee ====
- Deborah Paseur, former Lauderdale County district judge

==== General election ====
===== Endorsements =====
Tommy Bryan (R)

Organizations

- Alabama Farmers Federation
- Alabama Retail Association
- Alabama State Employees Association
Deborah Paseur (D)

Organizations

- Alabama AFL-CIO

===== Results =====
Results by county Bryan: 50–60%; 60–70%; 70–80%; 80–90%; Paseur: 50–60%; 60–70%; 70–80%; 80–90%

2010 Alabama Court of Civil Appeals election
Party	Candidate	Votes	%
Republican	Tommy Bryan (incumbent)	843,709	58.69%
Democratic	Deborah Paseur	592,930	41.24%
Write-in		963	0.07%
Total votes		1,437,602	100%

== Ballot measures ==
Five statewide measures were on the ballot in Alabama - one in June and four in November. All five of them were rejected by voters.

2010 Alabama ballot measures
Name	Description	Votes				Type
Name	Description	Yes	%	No	%	Type
Amendment 1 (June)	Enacts legislation to assess the propane gas industry for financial promotion programs.	272,457	40.03	408,266	59.97	Legislatively referred constitutional amendment
Amendment 1 (November)	Changes the Alabama Constitution to state that any prohibition against collections of any new taxes levied apply only to ad valorem taxes levied under the provisions of Amendment 778, enacted in 2006.	502,726	45.15	610,643	54.85	Legislatively referred constitutional amendment
Amendment 2	Provides that special county educational taxes be levied by a majority vote instead of a three-fifths vote.	552,525	47.68	606,357	52.32	Legislatively referred constitutional amendment
Amendment 3	Calls for a ten-year road and bridge construction program to be funded by appropriations from the Alabama Trust Fund.	530,017	43.01	702,340	56.99	Legislatively referred constitutional amendment
Amendment 4	Settles a local sales tax dispute in Blount County.	468,164	49.64	474,867	50.36	Legislatively referred constitutional amendment
Source: Alabama Secretary of State

Results by county

Amendment 1 (June) results by county
Yes:
- 50–60%
- 60–70%
- 70–80%
No:
- 50–60%
- 60–70%
- 70–80%

Amendment 1 (November) results by county
Yes:
- 50–60%
- 60–70%
- 70–80%
No:
- 50–60%
- 60–70%
- 70–80%

Amendment 2 results by county
Yes:
- 50–60%
- 60–70%
- 70–80%
No:
- 50–60%
- 60–70%
- 70–80%

Amendment 3 results by county
Yes:
- 50–60%
- 60–70%
- 70–80%
No:
- 50–60%
- 60–70%
- 70–80%

Amendment 4 results by county
Yes:
- 50–60%
- 60–70%
- 70–80%
No:
- 50–60%
- 60–70%
Tie:
- 50%
