= 2008 Alabama Public Service Commission election =

- November 4, 2008
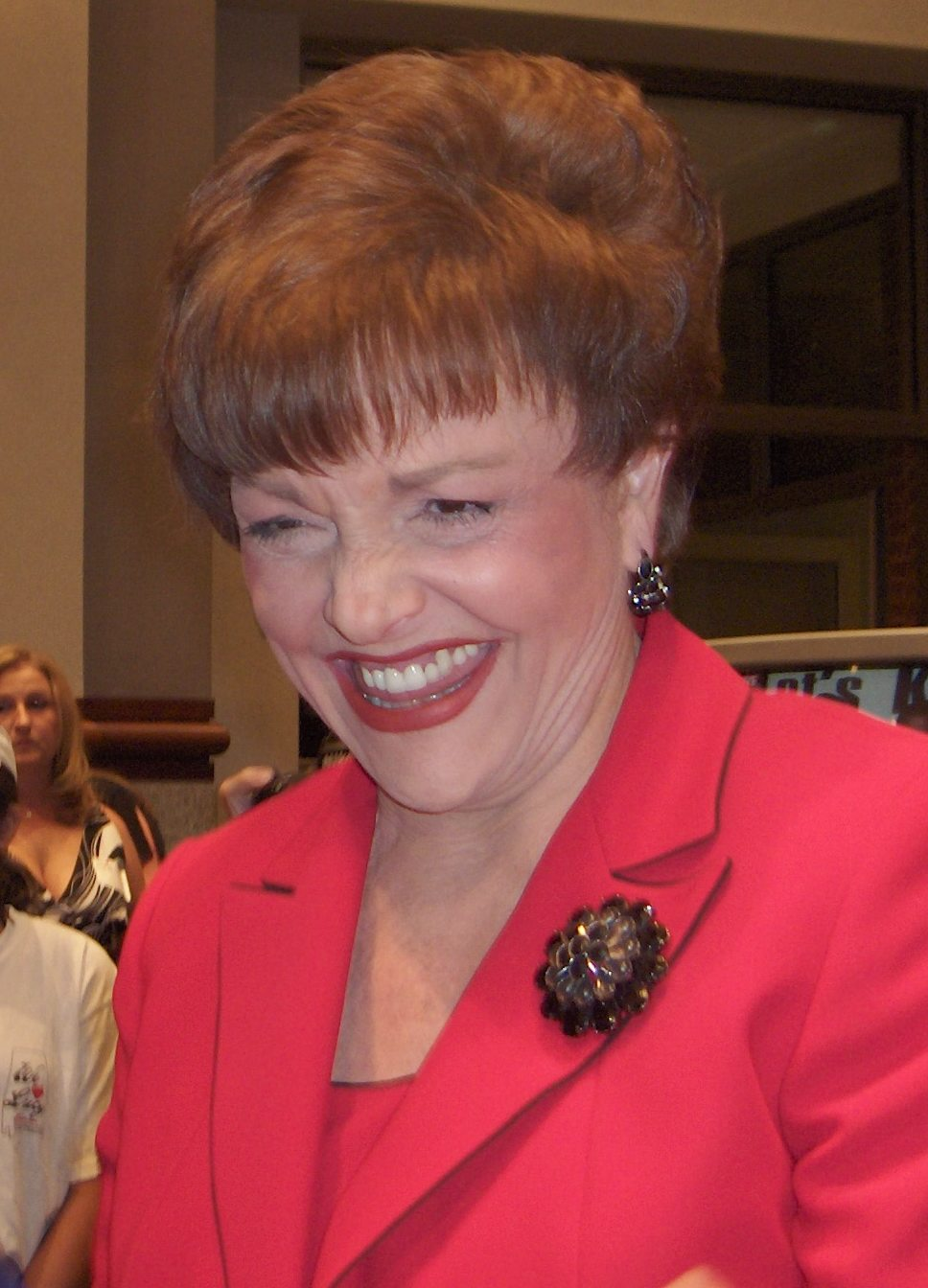

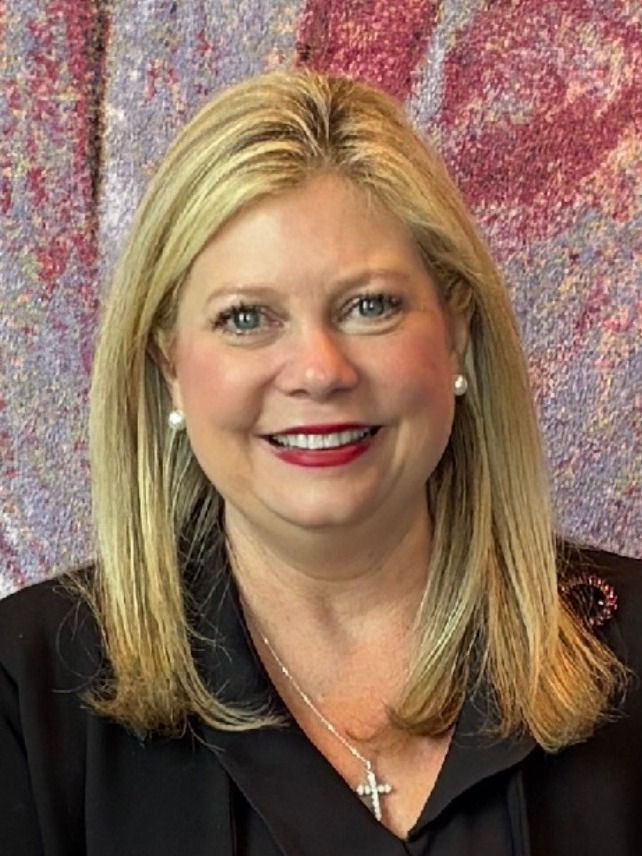
Candidate	Lucy Baxley	Twinkle Andress Cavanaugh
Party	Democratic	Republican
Popular vote	1,014,091	1,001,643
Percentage	50.3%	49.6%
- County results Baxley: 50–60% 60–70% 70–80% 80–90% Cavanaugh: 50–60% 60–70% 70–80%
President before election
Jim Sullivan
Republican
Elected President
Lucy Baxley
Democratic

The 2008 Alabama Public Service Commission election was held on November 4, 2008, to elect the president of the Alabama Public Service Commission. The primary election was held on June 3. Republican incumbent Jim Sullivan did not seek re-election.

Democratic nominee Lucy Baxley defeated Republican nominee Twinkle Andress Cavanaugh by a 0.7% margin. As of 2026, this is the last time that Democrats won a regularly scheduled statewide election in Alabama, the last time a Democrat won a statewide election in Alabama with a majority of votes, and the last statewide race in Alabama that was decided by a less than 1% margin. Cavanaugh was elected to a different seat on the Public Service Commission in 2010 and defeated Baxley for re-election in 2012 in a rematch.

== Republican primary ==
=== Candidates ===
==== Nominee ====
- Twinkle Andress Cavanaugh, former Alabama Republican Party chair

==== Eliminated in runoff ====
- Matt Chancey, marketing professional

==== Eliminated in primary ====
- Jack Hornady, Public Service Commission member

=== Results ===
Republican primary
Party	Candidate	Votes	%
Republican	Twinkle Andress Cavanaugh	87,128	47.02
Republican	Matt Chancey	52,891	28.55
Republican	Jack Hornady	45,265	24.43
Total votes		185,284	100.00

=== Runoff ===
Twinkle Andress Cavanaugh won the runoff on July 15.

Republican primary runoff
Party	Candidate	Votes	%
Republican	Twinkle Andress Cavanaugh	62,401	60.19
Republican	Matt Chancey	41,269	39.80
Total votes		103,670	100.00

== Democratic primary ==
=== Candidates ===
==== Nominee ====
- Lucy Baxley, state treasurer (1995–2003), lieutenant governor (2003–2007) and nominee for Governor in 2006

== General election ==
=== Results ===
2008 Alabama Public Service Commission presidential election
Party	Candidate	Votes	%
Democratic	Lucy Baxley	1,014,091	50.25
Republican	Twinkle Andress Cavanaugh	1,001,643	49.64
Write-in		2,199	0.11
Total votes		2,017,933	100.00
