= 2026 Alabama Public Service Commission election =

- November 3, 2026

The 2026 Alabama Public Service Commission election was held on November 3, 2026, to elect the two associate members of the Alabama Public Service Commission to four-year terms. Primary elections were held on May 19 and primary runoff elections were held on June 16 in races where no candidate received a majority of the vote.

== Place 1 ==
2026 Alabama Public Service Commission Place 1 election
- November 3, 2026
Candidate	Matt Gentry	James O. Gordon
Party	Republican	Democratic
Popular vote	914,850	744,948
Percentage	55.1%	44.8%
Commissioner before election
Jeremy Oden
Republican
Elected Commissioner
Matt Gentry
Republican

=== Republican primary ===
==== Candidates ====
===== Nominee =====
- Matt Gentry, Cullman County Sheriff (2014–present)

===== Eliminated in primary =====
- Jeremy Oden, incumbent commissioner

==== Endorsements ====
Matt Gentry

Organizations

- Alabama Farmers Federation
- Alabama Realtors PAC
- Manufacture Alabama

==== Fundraising ====
Campaign finance reports as of May 18, 2026
Candidate	Raised	Other receipts	Spent	Cash on hand
Matt Gentry (R)	$631,791	$100,000	$634,105	$97,686
Jeremy Oden (R)	$766,813	$35,821	$416,421	$16,244
Source: Alabama FCPA

==== Polling ====
Poll source	Date(s) administered	Sample size (Note: Key: A – all adults RV – registered voters LV – likely voters V – unclear)	Margin of error	Jeremy Oden	Matt Gentry	Undecided
The Alabama Poll	December 15, 2025	600 (LV)	± 4.0%	9%	15%	76%

==== Results ====
Primary results by county: Gentry: 60–70%; 70–80%; 80–90%

Republican primary
Party	Candidate	Votes	%
Republican	Matt Gentry	311,845	74.9
Republican	Jeremy Oden (incumbent)	104,541	25.1
Total votes		416,386	100.0

=== Democratic primary ===
==== Candidates ====
===== Nominee =====
- James O. Gordon, chiropractor and former state representative from the 98th district (2006–2010)

===== Eliminated in primary =====
- John Northrop, educator and journalist
- Jeff Ramsey, electrician and social media personality

==== Fundraising ====
Campaign finance reports as of May 18, 2026
Candidate	Raised	Other receipts	Spent	Cash on hand
James Gordon (D)	$5,097	$12,300	$24,028	$-6,631
John Northrop (D)	$9,687	$0	$7,283	$2,404
Jeff Ramsey (D)	$4,052	$19,006	$314	$22,744
Source: Alabama FCPA

==== Results ====
Primary results by county: Gordon: 40–50%; 50–60%; 60–70%; 70–80%; 80–90%; Ramsey: 30–40%; 40–50%

Democratic primary
Party	Candidate	Votes	%
Democratic	James O. Gordon	187,983	57.8
Democratic	Jeff Ramsey	87,510	26.9
Democratic	John Northrop	49,924	15.3
Total votes		325,417	100.0

=== General election ===
==== Fundraising ====
Campaign finance reports as of November 2, 2026
Candidate	Raised	Other receipts	Spent	Cash on hand
Matt Gentry (R)	$839,451	$600,000	$855,234	$584,216
James Gordon (D)	$11,432	$14,539	$25,800	$171
Source: Alabama FCPA

==== Results ====
2026 Alabama Public Service Commission election, place 1
Party	Candidate	Votes	%
Republican	Matt Gentry	914,850	55.08
Democratic	James O. Gordon	744,948	44.85
Write-in		1,196	0.07
Total votes		1,660,994	100.00
Republican hold			

== Place 2 ==
2026 Alabama Public Service Commission Place 2 election
- November 3, 2026
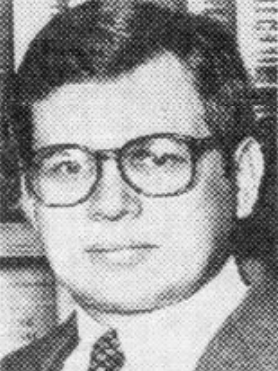

Candidate	Jim Zeigler	Sheila McNeil
Party	Republican	Democratic
Popular vote	909,902	751,315
Percentage	54.7%	45.2%
Commissioner before election
Chris Beeker III
Republican
Elected Commissioner
Jim Zeigler
Republican

=== Interim appointment ===
Incumbent commissioner Chris Beeker Jr. resigned in September 2024 over health concerns. Governor Kay Ivey appointed his son, Chris Beeker III, as the replacement commissioner.

==== Appointee ====
- Chris Beeker III, former USDA Rural Development Director for Alabama, and son of former commissioner Chris Beeker Jr.

=== Republican primary ===
==== Candidates ====
===== Nominee =====
- Jim Zeigler, former state auditor (2015–2023) and former member of the PSC (1974–1978)

===== Eliminated in runoff =====
- Chris Beeker III, incumbent commissioner

===== Eliminated in primary =====
- Priscilla Andrews, candidate for Houston County Commission in 2022
- Brent Woodall, attorney and candidate for Place 1 in 2022

===== Withdrawn =====
- Jeffrey M. Boyd, former Orange Beach city councilor

==== Endorsements ====
Chris Beeker III

Statewide officials

- Will Ainsworth, lieutenant governor of Alabama (2019–present)

Organizations

- Alabama Farmers Federation
- Alabama Realtors PAC
- Electric Cooperatives of Alabama

==== Fundraising ====
Campaign finance reports as of May 18, 2026
Candidate	Raised	Other receipts	Spent	Cash on hand
Priscilla Andrews (R)	$0	$0	$415	$-415
Chris Beeker III (R)	$338,550	$0	$291,281	$37,268
Brent Woodall (R)	$19,450	$20,000	$14,400	$25,049
Jim Zeigler (R)	$147,950	$500	$130,836	$17,613
Source: Alabama FCPA

==== Results ====
Primary results by county: Zeigler: 30–40%; 40–50%; 50–60%; Beeker: 40–50%; 50–60%; 70–80%

Republican primary
Party	Candidate	Votes	%
Republican	Jim Zeigler	189,724	44.8
Republican	Chris Beeker (incumbent)	103,835	24.5
Republican	Brent Woodall	77,185	18.2
Republican	Priscilla Andrews	52,371	12.4
Total votes		423,115	100.0

==== Runoff ====
===== Fundraising =====
Campaign finance reports as of June 15, 2026
Candidate	Raised	Other receipts	Spent	Cash on hand
Chris Beeker III (R)	$576,621	$0	$568,565	$8,055
Jim Zeigler (R)	$177,200	$500	$152,422	$25,277
Source: Alabama FCPA

===== Results =====
Runoff results by county: Zeigler: 50–60%; 60–70%; 70–80%; Beeker: 50–60%; 60–70%; 70–80%

Republican primary runoff
Party	Candidate	Votes	%
Republican	Jim Zeigler	152,633	51.3
Republican	Chris Beeker (incumbent)	144,640	48.7
Total votes		297,273	100.0

=== Democratic primary ===
==== Candidates ====
===== Nominee =====
- Sheila McNeil, chair of the Madison County Democratic Party and former San Antonio, Texas city councilmember

==== Fundraising ====
Campaign finance reports as of May 18, 2026
Candidate	Raised	Other receipts	Spent	Cash on hand
Sheila McNeil (D)	$2,909	$2,600	$4,301	$1,207
Source: Alabama FCPA

=== General election ===
==== Post-primary endorsements ====
Sheila McNeil (D)

Organizations

- Alabama AFL-CIO

==== Fundraising ====
Campaign finance reports as of November 2, 2026
Candidate	Raised	Other receipts	Spent	Cash on hand
Jim Zeigler (R)	$241,950	$500	$188,780	$53,669
Sheila McNeil (D)	$9,585	$3,503	$11,343	$1,744
Source: Alabama FCPA

=== Results ===
2026 Alabama Public Service Commission election, place 2
Party	Candidate	Votes	%
Republican	Jim Zeigler	909,902	54.73
Democratic	Sheila McNeil	751,315	45.19
Write-in		1,289	0.08
Total votes		1,662,506	100.00
Republican hold			
