= 2026 Alabama House Bill 392 =

2026 proposed Alabama law

Alabama House of Representatives
- Enacted by: Alabama House of Representatives
- Enacted by: Alabama Senate

Legislative history

Initiating chamber: Alabama House of Representatives
- Introduced by: Chip Brown
- Introduced: February 5, 2026
- Committee responsible: Transportation, Utilities and Infrastructure
- First reading: February 5, 2026
- Second reading: February 10, 2026

Revising chamber: Alabama Senate
- Committee responsible: Fiscal Responsibility and Economic Development (Note: As identical companion Senate Bill 268)
- First reading: February 5, 2026
- Status: Expired

Alabama House Bill 392 was a proposed 2026 law in the state of Alabama that would end statewide popular vote elections for the Alabama Public Service Commission and instead give the speaker of the Alabama House of Representatives, the governor, and Alabama Senate president pro tempore the power to appoint members. It was first introduced on February 5, 2026 by state representative Chip Brown.

== Background ==
Members of the Alabama Public Service Commission have been elected through statewide partisan elections since 1915. Two associate members as well as the president of the commission are elected to four-year terms.

== Impact ==
The bill would end elections for commission members upon the end of their current terms. The 2026 election would be the final election held. Once the terms expire, the governor would appoint the commission president, while the speaker of the house and the president pro tempore of the senate would appoint the two associate members.

== Legislative history ==
=== State house ===
The bill was first introduced by Chip Brown on February 5, 2026. In a committee meeting, Brown said that the bill would protect the commission from "out of state interests." It was approved by the House Transportation, Utilities and Infrastructure Committee on February 10. Kay Ivey expressed her support for the bill prior to the committee meeting. Despite a vote being originally scheduled for February 12, it was pulled from the calendar. House speaker Nathaniel Ledbetter stated that the bill had the support to pass in the house but needed additional support in the senate. State senate president pro tempore Garlan Gudger said that the bill did not have enough support to pass the senate.

=== State senate ===
Bobby Singleton introduced Senate Bill 268, an identical companion bill in the state senate on February 5.

== Aftermath ==
After the bill failed, the top lobbyist for Alabama Power resigned on March 3.
