= Beeker =

Beeker is a surname. Notable people with the surname include:

- Chris Beeker Jr., American politician and member of the Alabama Public Service Commission
- Chris Beeker III, American politician and member of the Alabama Public Service Commission
