= 2020 Alabama Public Service Commission election =

- November 3, 2020
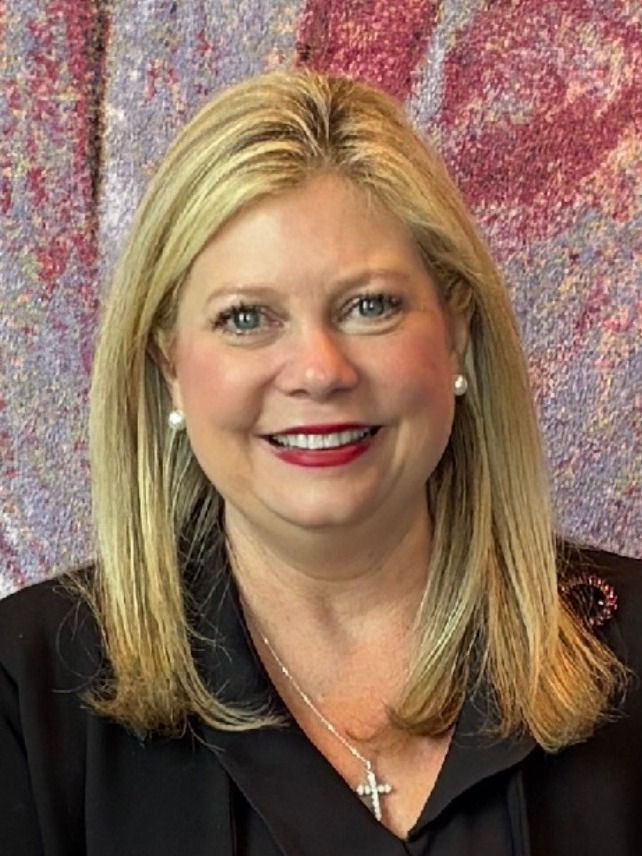

Nominee	Twinkle Andress Cavanaugh	Laura Casey
Party	Republican	Democratic
Popular vote	1,403,790	858,054
Percentage	61.99%	37.89%
- County results Cavanaugh: 50–60% 60–70% 70–80% 80–90% Casey: 50–60% 60–70% 70–80% 80–90%
President before election
Twinkle Andress Cavanaugh
Republican
Elected President
Twinkle Andress Cavanaugh
Republican

The 2020 Alabama Public Service Commission election took place on November 3, 2020, to elect the president of the Alabama Public Service Commission. Incumbent Republican Public Service Commission President Twinkle Andress Cavanaugh won re-election to a third term in office, defeating Democratic challenger Laura Casey in a landslide.

Primary elections were held on March 3.

== Republican primary ==
=== Candidates ===
==== Nominee ====
- Twinkle Andress Cavanaugh, incumbent public service commission president (2012–2025)

==== Eliminated in primary ====
- Robin Litaker, retired educator

==== Results ====
Republican primary results
Party	Candidate	Votes	%
Republican	Twinkle Andress Cavanaugh (incumbent)	462,979	73.82%
Republican	Robin Litaker	164,227	26.18%
Total votes		627,206	100.00%

== Democratic primary ==
=== Candidates ===
==== Nominee ====
- Laura Casey, retired attorney

==== Eliminated in primary ====
- Robert Mardis III, corporate imaging specialist

==== Results ====
Democratic primary results
Party	Candidate	Votes	%
Democratic	Laura Casey	252,851	78.48%
Democratic	Robert Mardis III	69,352	21.52%
Total votes		322,203	100.00%

== General election ==
=== Results ===
2020 Alabama Public Service Commission president election
Party	Candidate	Votes	%
Republican	Twinkle Andress Cavanaugh (incumbent)	1,403,790	61.99%
Democratic	Laura Casey	858,054	37.89%
Write-in		2,726	0.12%
Total votes		2,264,570	100.00%

==== By county ====
County	Twinkle Andress Cavanaugh Republican		Laura Casey Democratic		Write-in Various		Margin		Total
County	#	%	#	%	#	%	#	%	Total
Autauga	19,289	70.93%	7,864	28.92%	41	0.15%	11,425	42.01%	27,194
Baldwin	81,884	76.48%	25,067	23.41%	121	0.11%	56,817	53.06%	107,072
Barbour	5,379	52.77%	4,803	47.12%	12	0.12%	576	5.65%	10,194
Bibb	7,335	77.75%	2,090	22.15%	9	0.10%	5,245	55.60%	9,434
Blount	23,707	87.79%	3,264	12.09%	34	0.13%	20,443	75.70%	27,005
Bullock	1,114	25.03%	3,329	74.81%	7	0.16%	-2,215	-49.78%	4,450
Butler	5,175	56.10%	4,046	43.86%	3	0.03%	1,129	12.24%	9,224
Calhoun	34,112	68.61%	15,553	31.28%	56	0.11%	18,559	37.33%	49,721
Chambers	8,290	55.98%	6,498	43.88%	21	0.14%	1,792	12.10%	14,809
Cherokee	10,148	85.04%	1,774	14.87%	11	0.09%	8,374	70.18%	11,933
Chilton	15,341	81.92%	3,359	17.94%	26	0.14%	11,982	63.99%	18,726
Choctaw	3,821	54.25%	3,216	45.66%	6	0.09%	605	8.59%	7,043
Clarke	7,012	55.08%	5,710	44.85%	8	0.06%	1,302	10.23%	12,730
Clay	5,378	79.90%	1,345	19.98%	8	0.12%	4,033	59.92%	6,731
Cleburne	6,174	88.29%	813	11.63%	6	0.09%	5,361	76.66%	6,993
Coffee	16,415	75.69%	5,251	24.21%	22	0.10%	11,164	51.48%	21,688
Colbert	18,323	67.62%	8,743	32.26%	33	0.12%	9,580	35.35%	27,099
Conecuh	3,193	52.13%	2,930	47.84%	2	0.03%	263	4.29%	6,125
Coosa	3,551	66.32%	1,798	33.58%	5	0.09%	1,753	32.74%	5,354
Covington	14,042	82.98%	2,871	16.97%	9	0.05%	11,171	66.01%	16,922
Crenshaw	4,643	72.01%	1,799	27.90%	6	0.09%	2,844	44.11%	6,448
Cullman	35,831	87.35%	5,141	12.53%	48	0.12%	30,690	74.82%	41,020
Dale	13,821	72.11%	5,311	27.71%	35	0.18%	8,510	44.40%	19,167
Dallas	5,249	30.40%	12,003	69.52%	14	0.08%	-6,754	-39.12%	17,266
DeKalb	23,731	83.43%	4,680	16.45%	33	0.12%	19,051	66.98%	28,444
Elmore	29,492	73.39%	10,649	26.50%	47	0.12%	18,843	46.89%	40,188
Escambia	10,452	67.51%	5,016	32.40%	14	0.09%	5,436	35.11%	15,482
Etowah	34,401	73.64%	12,247	26.22%	67	0.14%	22,154	47.42%	46,715
Fayette	7,007	82.45%	1,486	17.49%	5	0.06%	5,521	64.97%	8,498
Franklin	9,629	80.23%	2,363	19.69%	10	0.08%	7,266	60.54%	12,002
Geneva	10,422	85.20%	1,793	14.66%	17	0.14%	8,629	70.54%	12,232
Greene	813	17.61%	3,799	82.28%	5	0.11%	-2,986	-64.67%	4,617
Hale	3,008	39.27%	4,647	60.67%	4	0.05%	-1,639	-21.40%	7,659
Henry	6,343	70.85%	2,599	29.03%	11	0.12%	3,744	41.82%	8,953
Houston	31,897	70.72%	13,142	29.14%	67	0.15%	18,755	41.58%	45,106
Jackson	18,572	82.25%	3,991	17.67%	18	0.08%	14,581	64.57%	22,581
Jefferson	138,091	43.23%	180,954	56.65%	386	0.12%	-42,863	-13.42%	319,431
Lamar	5,951	84.98%	1,050	14.99%	2	0.03%	4,901	69.98%	7,003
Lauderdale	30,138	70.46%	12,593	29.44%	45	0.11%	17,545	41.02%	42,776
Lawrence	11,711	75.61%	3,761	24.28%	17	0.11%	7,950	51.33%	15,489
Lee	41,775	59.92%	27,848	39.94%	98	0.14%	13,927	19.98%	69,721
Limestone	33,692	70.44%	14,056	29.38%	86	0.18%	19,636	41.05%	47,834
Lowndes	1,726	26.33%	4,827	73.63%	3	0.05%	-3,101	-47.30%	6,556
Macon	1,580	18.52%	6,943	81.40%	7	0.08%	-5,363	-62.87%	8,530
Madison	102,002	54.28%	85,608	45.56%	303	0.16%	16,394	8.72%	187,913
Marengo	4,979	47.69%	5,456	52.26%	6	0.06%	-477	-4.57%	10,441
Marion	11,734	87.37%	1,684	12.54%	13	0.10%	10,050	74.83%	13,431
Marshall	32,115	82.92%	6,570	16.96%	45	0.12%	25,545	65.96%	38,730
Mobile	99,231	55.44%	79,569	44.46%	180	0.10%	19,662	10.99%	178,980
Monroe	5,901	56.54%	4,527	43.37%	9	0.09%	1,374	13.16%	10,437
Montgomery	33,222	34.18%	63,864	65.71%	107	0.11%	-30,642	-31.53%	97,193
Morgan	38,767	74.10%	13,499	25.80%	51	0.10%	25,268	48.30%	52,317
Perry	1,282	25.28%	3,787	74.66%	3	0.06%	-2,505	-49.39%	5,072
Pickens	5,429	57.52%	3,998	42.36%	12	0.13%	1,431	15.16%	9,439
Pike	7,897	58.60%	5,566	41.31%	12	0.09%	2,331	17.30%	13,475
Randolph	8,047	77.27%	2,357	22.63%	10	0.10%	5,690	54.64%	10,414
Russell	9,428	45.13%	11,440	54.76%	22	0.11%	-2,012	-9.63%	20,890
Shelby	78,220	69.57%	34,059	30.29%	147	0.13%	44,161	39.28%	112,426
St. Clair	35,290	80.91%	8,283	18.99%	46	0.11%	27,007	61.92%	43,619
Sumter	1,473	24.28%	4,588	75.63%	5	0.08%	-3,115	-51.35%	6,066
Talladega	21,797	61.95%	13,348	37.94%	40	0.11%	8,449	24.01%	35,185
Tallapoosa	14,500	70.80%	5,969	29.14%	12	0.06%	8,531	41.65%	20,481
Tuscaloosa	50,362	57.03%	37,787	42.79%	158	0.18%	12,575	14.24%	88,307
Walker	25,005	82.03%	5,434	17.83%	45	0.15%	19,571	64.20%	30,484
Washington	5,906	70.09%	2,513	29.82%	7	0.08%	3,393	40.27%	8,426
Wilcox	1,731	30.33%	3,974	69.62%	3	0.05%	-2,243	-39.30%	5,708
Winston	9,814	89.45%	1,152	10.50%	5	0.05%	8,662	78.95%	10,971
Totals	1,403,790	61.99%	858,054	37.89%	2,726	0.12%	545,736	24.10%	2,264,570
