= James Gordon (Alabama politician) =

American politician

Member of the Alabama House of Representatives from the 98th district
- In office January 2007 – January 2011
- Succeeded by: Napoleon Bracy

Personal details
- Born: July 17, 1964 (age 62)
- Party: Democratic
- Education: Georgia Highlands College (BA); Life University (DC); Novus University (JD)

James O. Gordon (born 1964) is an American politician who served as a member of the Alabama House of Representatives from 2006 to 2010. A member of the Alabama Democratic Party, he is running in the 2026 Alabama Public Service Commission election.

== Career ==
Gordon was elected to the state house in 2006. He left office in 2010. He has worked as a chiropractor, and filed for bankruptcy in 2011. He qualified to run for the Alabama Public Service Commission in the 2026 Democratic primary, held on May 19.
