= 2018 Alabama lieutenant gubernatorial election =

- November 6, 2018
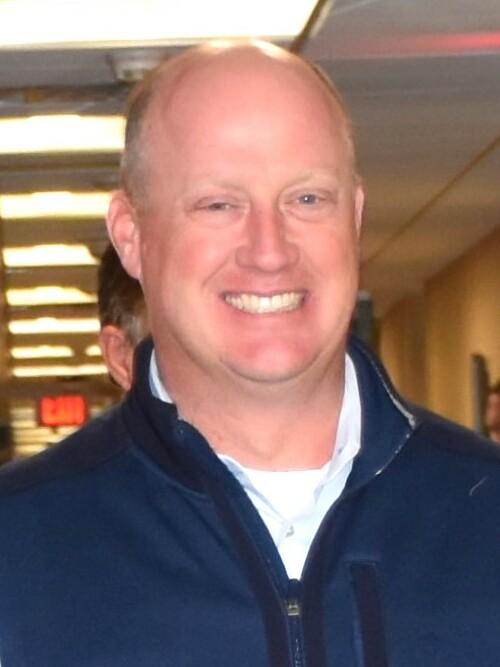

Candidate	Will Ainsworth	Will Boyd
Party	Republican	Democratic
Popular vote	1,044,941	660,013
Percentage	61.25%	38.69%
- Ainsworth: 50–60% 60–70% 70–80% 80–90% Boyd: 50–60% 60–70% 70–80% 80–90%
Lieutenant Governor before election
Vacant
Elected Lieutenant Governor
Will Ainsworth
Republican

The 2018 Alabama lieutenant gubernatorial election was held on November 6, 2018, to elect the Lieutenant Governor of Alabama, concurrently with elections to the United States House of Representatives, governor, and other state and local elections. Primary elections were held on June 5, 2018, with runoff elections held on July 17, 2018, in races which nobody cleared at least 50% of the vote.

Incumbent Republican lieutenant governor Kay Ivey resigned on April 10, 2017, to become to the Governor of Alabama following the resignation of Robert Bentley. Following Ivey's resignation, the office of Lieutenant Governor remained vacant until the 2018 election cycle.

Republican state representative Will Ainsworth won a competitive primary and runoff against Alabama Public Service Commissioner Twinkle Cavanaugh, and pastor Will Boyd became the Democratic nominee without any opposition. Ainsworth comfortably won the general election.

== Republican primary ==
=== Candidates ===
==== Nominee ====
- Will Ainsworth, state representative from the 27th district (2014–present)

==== Eliminated in primary ====
- Twinkle Cavanaugh, president of the Alabama Public Service Commission
- Rusty Glover, state senator from the 34th district (2006–present)

==== Withdrew before primary ====
- Mary Scott Hunter, member of the Alabama State Board of Education

=== Results ===
Runoff results by county Ainsworth: 50–60%; 60–70%; 70–80%; Cavanaugh: 50–60%; 60–70%

Republican primary results
Party	Candidate	Votes	%
Republican	Twinkle Cavanaugh	238,991	43.27%
Republican	Will Ainsworth	205,017	37.12%
Republican	Rusty Glover	108,338	19.61%
Total votes		552,346	100.00%

Republican primary runoff results
Party	Candidate	Votes	%
Republican	Will Ainsworth	176,873	51.48%
Republican	Twinkle Cavanaugh	166,691	48.52%
Total votes		343,564	100.00%

== Democratic nominee ==
=== Declared ===
- Will Boyd, pastor and candidate for U.S. Senate in 2017

== General election ==
=== Post-primary endorsements ===
Will Ainsworth (R)

Organizations

- Alabama Association of REALTORS
- Alabama Forestry Association
Will Boyd (D)

Labor unions

- Alabama AFL-CIO

Organizations

- Southeastern Carpenters Regional Council

=== Polling ===
Poll source	Date(s) administered	Sample size	Margin of error	Will Ainsworth (R)	Will Boyd (D)	Undecided
Research Consultants (R)	September 22, 2018	316	± 5.5%	53%	39%	8%
Cygnal (R)	July 24–25, 2018	1,027	± 3.1%	53%	41%	6%

=== Results ===
2018 Alabama lieutenant gubernatorial election
Party	Candidate	Votes	%
Republican	Will Ainsworth	1,044,941	61.25%
Democratic	Will Boyd	660,013	38.69%
Write-in		1,023	0.06%
Total votes		1,705,977	100.00%
Republican hold			

==== By county ====
County	Will Ainsworth Republican		Will Boyd Democratic		Write-in Various		Margin		Total
County	#	%	#	%	#	%	#	%	Total
Autauga	14,183	72.19%	5,450	27.74%	13	0.07%	8,733	44.45%	19,646
Baldwin	58,996	76.12%	18,465	23.82%	48	0.06%	40,531	52.29%	77,509
Barbour	4,183	50.31%	4,126	49.63%	5	0.06%	57	0.69%	8,314
Bibb	5,240	76.42%	1,615	23.55%	2	0.03%	3,625	52.87%	6,857
Blount	17,348	89.24%	2,082	10.71%	10	0.05%	15,266	78.53%	19,440
Bullock	889	24.16%	2,789	75.81%	1	0.03%	-1,900	-51.64%	3,679
Butler	4,617	57.49%	3,410	42.46%	4	0.05%	1,207	15.03%	8,031
Calhoun	24,856	67.59%	11,901	32.36%	18	0.05%	12,955	35.23%	36,775
Chambers	6,463	57.91%	4,688	42.00%	10	0.09%	1,775	15.90%	11,161
Cherokee	6,995	83.40%	1,390	16.57%	2	0.02%	5,605	66.83%	8,387
Chilton	11,402	83.14%	2,309	16.84%	4	0.03%	9,093	66.30%	13,715
Choctaw	3,190	53.86%	2,728	46.06%	5	0.08%	462	7.80%	5,923
Clarke	6,279	56.67%	4,794	43.27%	6	0.05%	1,485	13.40%	11,079
Clay	4,248	79.74%	1,077	20.22%	2	0.04%	3,171	59.53%	5,327
Cleburne	3,913	89.52%	453	10.36%	5	0.11%	3,460	79.16%	4,371
Coffee	12,067	75.76%	3,850	24.17%	10	0.06%	8,217	51.59%	15,927
Colbert	13,264	64.48%	7,296	35.47%	11	0.05%	5,968	29.01%	20,571
Conecuh	2,422	49.84%	2,435	50.10%	3	0.06%	-13	-0.27%	4,860
Coosa	2,824	66.07%	1,446	33.83%	4	0.09%	1,378	32.24%	4,274
Covington	9,925	82.85%	2,047	17.09%	7	0.06%	7,878	65.77%	11,979
Crenshaw	3,820	71.89%	1,492	28.08%	2	0.04%	2,328	43.81%	5,314
Cullman	24,892	87.20%	3,641	12.75%	13	0.05%	21,251	74.44%	28,546
Dale	10,371	72.88%	3,850	27.05%	10	0.07%	6,521	45.82%	14,231
Dallas	4,621	30.67%	10,439	69.28%	8	0.05%	-5,818	-38.61%	15,068
DeKalb	17,593	83.08%	3,569	16.85%	14	0.07%	14,024	66.23%	21,176
Elmore	21,977	74.79%	7,398	25.18%	9	0.03%	14,579	49.62%	29,384
Escambia	8,043	67.49%	3,869	32.47%	5	0.04%	4,174	35.03%	11,917
Etowah	24,853	72.40%	9,455	27.54%	20	0.06%	15,398	44.86%	34,328
Fayette	5,660	78.20%	1,574	21.75%	4	0.06%	4,086	56.45%	7,238
Franklin	6,471	75.62%	2,080	24.31%	6	0.07%	4,391	51.31%	8,557
Geneva	7,753	86.68%	1,184	13.24%	7	0.08%	6,569	73.45%	8,944
Greene	670	16.20%	3,465	83.78%	1	0.02%	-2,795	-67.58%	4,136
Hale	2,439	37.69%	4,030	62.27%	3	0.05%	-1,591	-24.58%	6,472
Henry	4,620	69.89%	1,988	30.08%	2	0.03%	2,632	39.82%	6,610
Houston	23,016	71.68%	9,075	28.26%	19	0.06%	13,941	43.42%	32,110
Jackson	12,376	79.78%	3,129	20.17%	7	0.05%	9,247	59.61%	15,512
Jefferson	111,805	43.61%	144,424	56.33%	141	0.05%	-32,619	-12.72%	256,370
Lamar	4,444	83.46%	880	16.53%	1	0.02%	3,564	66.93%	5,325
Lauderdale	20,927	68.18%	9,747	31.76%	19	0.06%	11,180	36.43%	30,693
Lawrence	8,346	71.11%	3,387	28.86%	3	0.03%	4,959	42.25%	11,736
Lee	29,096	59.38%	19,879	40.57%	27	0.06%	9,217	18.81%	49,002
Limestone	23,647	70.80%	9,736	29.15%	16	0.05%	13,911	41.65%	33,399
Lowndes	1,399	27.91%	3,613	72.07%	1	0.02%	-2,214	-44.17%	5,013
Macon	1,176	16.28%	6,044	83.68%	3	0.04%	-4,868	-67.40%	7,223
Madison	77,469	55.07%	63,118	44.87%	81	0.06%	14,351	10.20%	140,668
Marengo	4,037	46.33%	4,674	53.64%	3	0.03%	-637	-7.31%	8,714
Marion	8,283	85.35%	1,414	14.57%	8	0.08%	6,869	70.78%	9,705
Marshall	22,832	83.87%	4,362	16.02%	29	0.11%	18,470	67.85%	27,223
Mobile	71,214	53.74%	61,192	46.17%	116	0.09%	10,022	7.56%	132,522
Monroe	4,897	55.91%	3,856	44.03%	5	0.06%	1,041	11.89%	8,758
Montgomery	27,912	36.33%	48,856	63.59%	60	0.08%	-20,944	-27.26%	76,828
Morgan	29,399	74.70%	9,937	25.25%	19	0.05%	19,462	49.45%	39,355
Perry	1,057	25.07%	3,156	74.86%	3	0.07%	-2,099	-49.79%	4,216
Pickens	4,742	57.61%	3,484	42.33%	5	0.06%	1,258	15.28%	8,231
Pike	6,084	58.74%	4,269	41.21%	5	0.05%	1,815	17.52%	10,358
Randolph	5,688	75.75%	1,818	24.21%	3	0.04%	3,870	51.54%	7,509
Russell	6,842	45.75%	8,104	54.19%	9	0.06%	-1,262	-8.44%	14,955
Shelby	59,717	71.41%	23,859	28.53%	53	0.06%	35,858	42.88%	83,629
St. Clair	24,206	81.04%	5,649	18.91%	15	0.05%	18,557	62.13%	29,870
Sumter	1,252	23.36%	4,106	76.60%	2	0.04%	-2,854	-53.25%	5,360
Talladega	15,860	60.59%	10,309	39.38%	8	0.03%	5,551	21.21%	26,177
Tallapoosa	11,029	70.57%	4,593	29.39%	7	0.04%	6,436	41.18%	15,629
Tuscaloosa	37,639	55.19%	30,507	44.73%	50	0.07%	7,132	10.46%	68,196
Walker	18,524	80.94%	4,342	18.97%	20	0.09%	14,182	61.97%	22,886
Washington	4,698	69.79%	2,031	30.17%	3	0.04%	2,667	39.62%	6,732
Wilcox	1,439	30.83%	3,224	69.08%	4	0.09%	-1,785	-38.25%	4,667
Winston	6,802	88.80%	854	11.15%	4	0.05%	5,948	77.65%	7,660
Totals	1,044,941	61.25%	660,013	38.69%	1,023	0.06%	384,928	22.56%	1,705,977

==== By congressional district ====
Ainsworth won six of seven congressional districts.

District	Ainsworth	Boyd	Representative
1st	62%	38%	Bradley Byrne
2nd	64%	36%	Martha Roby
3rd	64%	36%	Mike Rogers
4th	79%	21%	Robert Aderholt
5th	63%	37%	Mo Brooks
6th	68%	32%	Gary Palmer
7th	28%	72%	Terri Sewell
