= 1904 Alabama Railroad Commission election =

- November 8, 1904
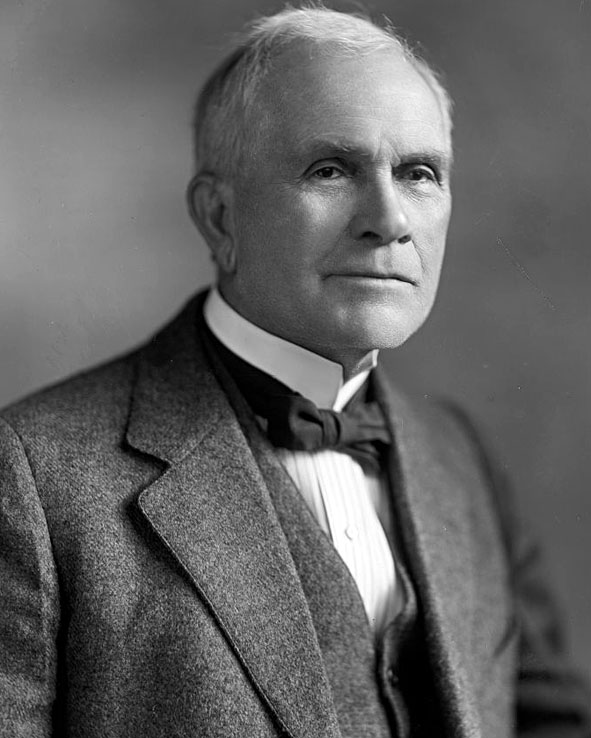

Candidate	B. B. Comer	T. B. Foster
Party	Democratic	Socialist
Popular vote	83,497	885
Percentage	98.95%	1.05%
president before election
Democratic
Elected president
B. B. Comer
Democratic

The 1904 Alabama Railroad Commission election was held on November 8, 1904, to elect the president of the Alabama Railroad Commission. Democratic nominee B. B. Comer was elected.

== Nominees ==
- B. B. Comer (Democratic)
- T. B. Foster (Socialist)

== General election ==
=== Results ===
1904 Alabama Railroad Commission President election
Party	Candidate	Votes	%
Democratic	B. B. Comer	83,497	98.95
Socialist	T. B. Foster	883	1.05
Total votes		84,380	100.00%
