= 2022 Alabama Public Service Commission election =

- November 8, 2022

2 seats of the Alabama Public Service Commission
| | First party | Second party |
|---|---|---|
| Party | Republican | Democratic |
| Seats before | 3 | 0 |
| Seats after | 3 | 0 |
| Seat change | Steady | Steady |

The 2022 Alabama Public Service Commission election was held on November 8, 2022, to elect two members to the Alabama Public Service Commission. Primary elections were held on May 24, 2022, with the primary runoff being held on June 21.

== Place 1 ==
2022 Alabama Public Service Commission Place 1 election
- November 8, 2022
| Nominee | Jeremy Oden | Ron Bishop |
| Party | Republican | Libertarian |
| Popular vote | 937,114 | 173,287 |
| Percentage | 83.72% | 15.48 |
- Oden: 40–50% 50–60% 60–70% 70–80% 80–90% >90% Bishop: 40–50% 50–60% 60–70% 70–80% 80–90% >90% Tie: 40-50% 50% No votes
Commissioner before election
Jeremy Oden
Republican
Elected Commissioner
Jeremy Oden
Republican

=== Republican primary ===
==== Candidates ====
===== Nominee =====
- Jeremy Oden, incumbent commissioner.

===== Eliminated in runoff =====
- Brent Woodall, attorney.

===== Eliminated in primary =====
- John Hammock, mayor of Tallassee.
- Stephen McLamb, journalist.

==== First round results ====
Oden: 30–40%; 40–50%; 50–60%; 60–70%; Woodall: 20–30%; 30–40%; 40–50%; Hammock: 30–40%; Tie: 30–40%

Oden: 20–30%; 30–40%; 40–50%; 50–60%; 60–70%; 70–80%; 80–90%; >90%; Woodall: 20–30%; 30–40%; 40–50%; 50–60%; 60–70%; >90%; Hammock: 20–30%; 30–40%; 40–50%; 50–60%; 60–70%; 70–80%; 80–90%; >90%; McLamb: 20–30%; 30–40%; 40–50%; 50–60%; 60–70%; 70–80%; >90%; Tie: 20–30%; 30–40%; 40–50%; 50%; No votes

Republican primary results
| Party | Candidate | Votes | % |
|---|---|---|---|
| Republican | Jeremy Oden (incumbent) | 166,972 | 34.28 |
| Republican | Brent Woodall | 150,564 | 30.92 |
| Republican | John Hammock | 116,532 | 23.93 |
| Republican | Stephen McLamb | 52,944 | 10.87 |
| Total votes | | 487,012 | 100.00 |

==== Runoff results ====
Primary runoff results by county: Oden: 50–60%; 60–70%; 70–80%; Woodall: 50–60%; 60–70%

Republican primary runoff results
| Party | Candidate | Votes | % |
|---|---|---|---|
| Republican | Jeremy Oden (incumbent) | 175,842 | 52.32 |
| Republican | Brent Woodall | 160,263 | 47.68 |
| Total votes | | 336,105 | 100.00 |

=== Libertarian convention ===
==== Nominee ====
- Ron Bishop

=== General election ===
2022 Alabama Public Service Commission election, Place 1
| Party | Candidate | Votes | % |
|---|---|---|---|
| Republican | Jeremy Oden (incumbent) | 937,114 | 83.72% |
| Libertarian | Ron Bishop | 173,287 | 15.48% |
| Write-in | | 8,976 | 0.80% |
| Total votes | | 1,119,377 | 100% |

== Place 2 ==
2022 Alabama Public Service Commission Place 2 election
- November 8, 2022
| Nominee | Chris Beeker Jr. | Laura Lane |
| Party | Republican | Libertarian |
| Popular vote | 931,354 | 179,883 |
| Percentage | 83.17% | 16.06% |
- County results Beeker: 50–60% 60–70% 70–80% 80–90% >90%
Commissioner before election
Chris Beeker Jr.
Republican
Elected Commissioner
Chris Beeker Jr.
Republican

=== Republican primary ===
==== Candidates ====
===== Nominee =====
- Chris Beeker Jr., incumbent commissioner

===== Eliminated in runoff =====
- Robert McCollum, small business owner

===== Eliminated in primary =====
- Robin Litaker, retired teacher

==== First round results ====
Republican primary results
| Party | Candidate | Votes | % |
|---|---|---|---|
| Republican | Chris Beeker Jr. (incumbent) | 208,175 | 43.14 |
| Republican | Robert L. McCollum | 173,004 | 35.85 |
| Republican | Robin Litaker | 101,347 | 21.00 |
| Total votes | | 482,526 | 100.00 |

==== Runoff results ====
Republican primary runoff results
| Party | Candidate | Votes | % |
|---|---|---|---|
| Republican | Chris Beeker Jr. (incumbent) | 215,337 | 63.24 |
| Republican | Robert L. McCollum | 125,178 | 36.36 |
| Total votes | | 340,555 | 100.00 |

=== Libertarian convention ===
==== Nominee ====
- Laura Lane, former Libertarian Party of Alabama chair

=== General election ===
2022 Alabama Public Service Commission election, Place 2
| Party | Candidate | Votes | % |
|---|---|---|---|
| Republican | Chris Beeker Jr. (incumbent) | 931,354 | 83.17% |
| Libertarian | Laura Lane | 179,883 | 16.06% |
| Write-in | | 8,624 | 0.77% |
| Total votes | | 1,119,861 | 100% |
