= 2012 Alabama elections =

A general election was held in the U.S. state of Alabama on November 6, 2012. Along with the presidential election, all of Alabama's seven seats in the United States House of Representatives and several state-level and local offices were up for election. Primary elections took place on March 13, 2012.

== Federal offices ==
=== President of the United States ===
Republican candidate Mitt Romney won Alabama with 60.55% of the vote and gained nine electoral votes.

=== United States House of Representatives ===
All of Alabama's seven seats in the United States House of Representatives were up for election in 2012. Six Republicans and one Democrat were re-elected. No districts changed partisan control.

== Public Service Commission ==
2012 Alabama Public Service Commission election
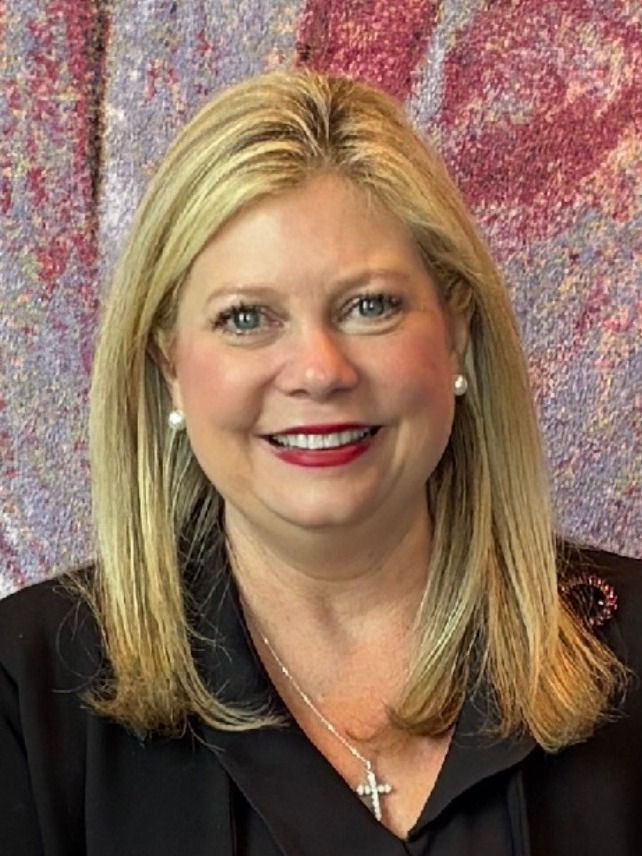

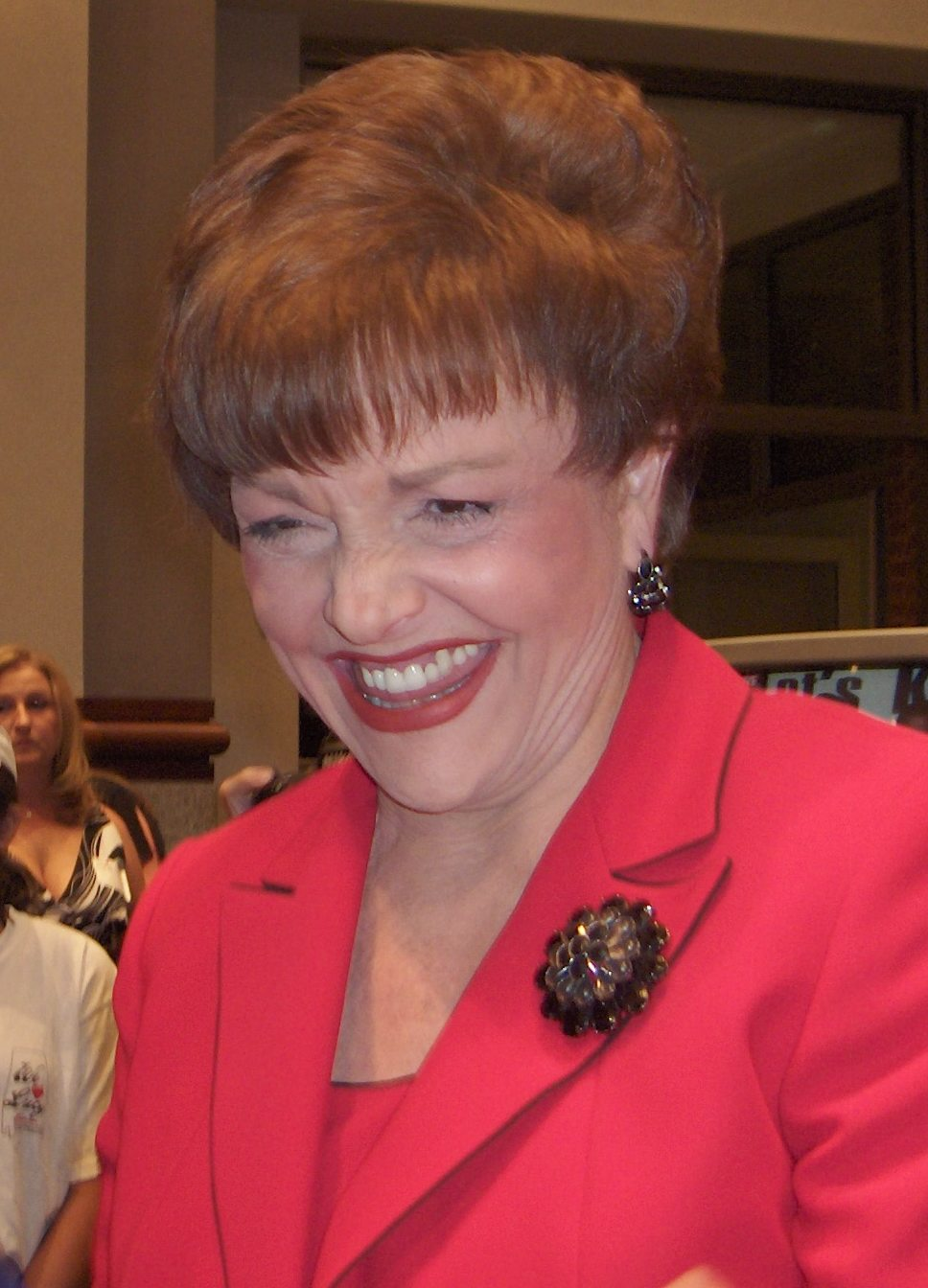
Nominee	Twinkle Andress Cavanaugh	Lucy Baxley
Party	Republican	Democratic
Popular vote	1,078,108	909,323
Percentage	54.17%	45.69%
- County results Cavanaugh: 50–60% 60–70% 70–80% Baxley: 50–60% 60–70% 70–80% 80–90%
Commissioner before election
Lucy Baxley
Democratic
Elected Commissioner
Twinkle Andress Cavanaugh
Republican

Incumbent Alabama Public Service Commission president Lucy Baxley, the only Democrat holding a statewide office at the time, lost re-election to Twinkle Andress Cavanaugh in a rematch of 2008.

=== Democratic nominee ===
- Lucy Baxley, incumbent Alabama Public Service Commission president.

=== Republican primary ===
==== Candidates ====
- Twinkle Andress Cavanaugh, associate Alabama Public Service Commissioner and 2008 Republican nominee.
- Chip Brown, real estate businessman and military veteran.
- Kathy Peterson, businesswoman.

==== Primary results ====
2012 Alabama PSC President Republican primary results
Party	Candidate	Votes	%
Republican	Twinkle Andress Cavanaugh	248,297	48.92%
Republican	Chip Brown	135,568	26.71%
Republican	Kathy Peterson	123,729	24.37%
Total votes		507,594	100%

==== Primary runoff results ====
2012 Alabama PSC President Republican primary runoff results
Party	Candidate	Votes	%
Republican	Twinkle Andress Cavanaugh	52,371	60.82%
Republican	Chip Brown	33,734	39.18%
Total votes		86,105	100%

=== General election ===
2012 Alabama PSC President election results
Party	Candidate	Votes	%
Republican	Twinkle Andress Cavanaugh	1,078,108	54.17%
Democratic	Lucy Baxley (incumbent)	909,323	45.69%
Write-in		2,890	0.15%
Total votes		1,990,321	100%
Republican gain from Democratic			

== State judiciary ==
Eleven statewide judicial seats in Alabama were up for election - five from the state supreme court and six from the appellate courts. Only two of them were contested.

=== State Supreme Court, Chief Justice ===
2012 Alabama Supreme Court Chief Justice election
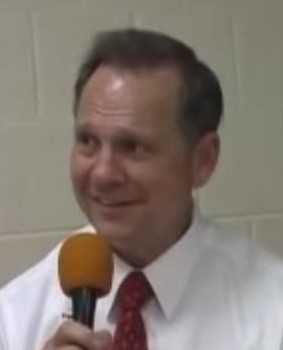

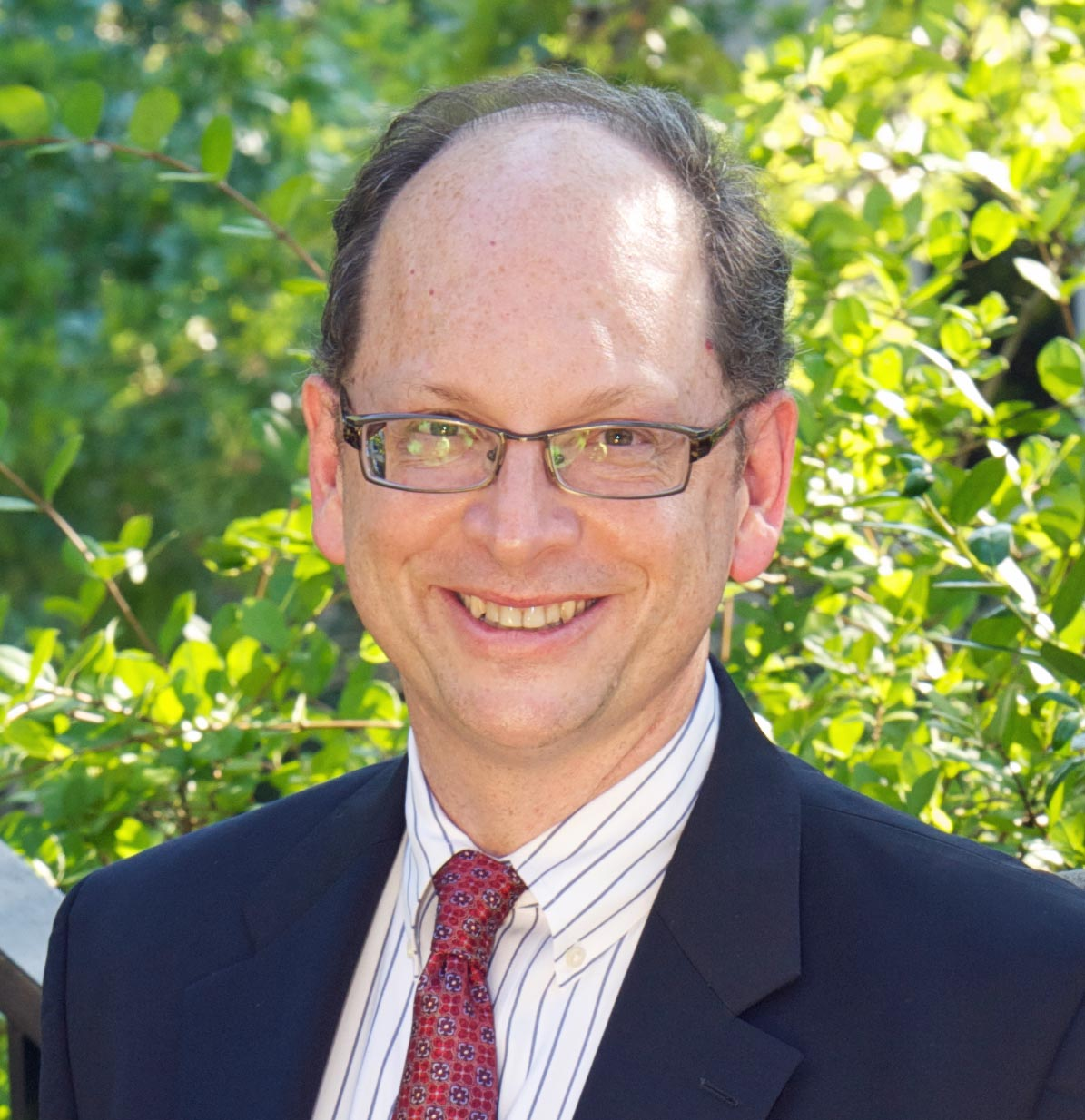
Nominee	Roy Moore	Bob Vance
Party	Republican	Democratic
Popular vote	1,051,627	977,301
Percentage	51.77%	48.12%
- County results Moore: 50–60% 60–70% 70–80% Vance: 40–50% 50–60% 60–70% 70–80% 80–90%
Chief Justice before election
Chuck Malone
Republican
Elected Chief Justice
Roy Moore
Republican

Incumbent Republican Justice Chuck Malone was appointed by Governor Robert J. Bentley in 2011 to fill the remaining term of Democrat Sue Bell Cobb who resigned. Malone ran for re-election to a full term and was challenged by former chief justice Roy Moore and circuit court judge Charles Graddick in the Republican primary. Jefferson County circuit court judge Bob Vance emerged as the Democratic frontrunner after Harry Lyon, the former nominee, was disqualified due to improper comments made by him online.

The involvement of Moore drew a lot of attention to the race owing to his controversial previous tenure as chief justice and initially attracted write-in candidates who sought to block his return. Some former Republican justices even endorsed Vance instead of Moore despite him winning the primary.

Roy Moore won the general election in November, returning to the state supreme court after a decade. Vance lost by a margin of 3.65% while on the same ballot Barack Obama lost by 22%, indicating a strong overperformance in deep red Alabama.

==== Republican Primary ====
===== Candidates =====
- Chuck Malone, incumbent chief justice.
- Roy Moore, former chief justice.
- Charles Graddick, circuit court judge.

===== Primary results =====
Republican primary results
Party	Candidate	Votes	%
Republican	Roy Moore	282,743	50.38%
Republican	Charles Graddick	141,570	25.22%
Republican	Chuck Malone (incumbent)	136,927	24.40%
Total votes		561,240	100%

==== Democratic Nominee ====
- Bob Vance, circuit court judge.

===== Disqualified =====
- Harry Lyon, lawyer.

==== Independent Candidates (later withdrew) ====
- Ginger Poynter, lawyer. (endorsed Vance)
- Melinda Lee Maddox, lawyer.

==== General election ====
2012 Alabama Supreme Court Chief Justice election
Party	Candidate	Votes	%
Republican	Roy Moore	1,051,627	51.77%
Democratic	Bob Vance	977,301	48.12%
Write-in		2,189	0.11%
Total votes		2,031,117	100%
Republican hold			

=== State Supreme Court, Associate Justice (Place 1) ===
Incumbent Republican Justice Thomas Woodall decided not to seek re-election.

==== Republican Primary ====
===== Confirmed Candidates =====
- Debra Jones, circuit court judge.
- Tommy Bryan, judge on the Alabama Court of Civil Appeals.

===== Withdrawn candidates =====
- Scott Donaldson, circuit court judge.

===== Primary results =====
Republican primary results
Party	Candidate	Votes	%
Republican	Tommy Bryan	309,147	65.35%
Republican	Debra Jones	163,938	34.65%
Total votes		473,085	100%

==== General election ====
2012 Alabama Supreme Court Associate Justice Place 1 election
Party	Candidate	Votes	%
Republican	Tommy Bryan	1,264,751	98.08%
Write-in		24,788	1.92%
Total votes		1,289,539	100%
Republican hold			

== Ballot measures ==
Twelve statewide ballot measures appeared on the ballot in Alabama - one in September and eleven in November. All but one were approved by the voters.

2012 Alabama ballot measures
Name	Description	Votes				Type
Name	Description	Yes	%	No	%	Type
Amendment 1 (September)	Transfers $145.8 million from an oil and gas trust fund to the General Fund for Medicaid budget.	390,421	65.35	206,995	34.65	Legislatively referred constitutional amendment
Amendment 1 (November)	Extends payments made to the Forever Wild Land Trust for a 20-year period.	1,323,819	75.16	437,560	24.84	Legislatively referred constitutional amendment
Amendment 2	Allows issuance of general obligation bonds of no more than $750 million.	1,145,034	69.41	504,610	30.59	Legislatively referred constitutional amendment
Amendment 3	Defines the Stockton Landmark District within Baldwin County.	887,024	67.80	421,255	32.20	Legislatively referred constitutional amendment
Amendment 4	Removes references to segregation of schools from the state constitution.	675,064	39.34	1,040,987	60.66	Legislatively referred constitutional amendment
Amendment 5	Transfers assets and liabilities of the Water Works and Sewer Board of the City of Prichard to the Mobile Area Water Sewer System.	900,596	68.66	411,167	31.34	Legislatively referred constitutional amendment
Amendment 6	Prohibits mandatory participation in any healthcare system.	969,069	58.96	674,518	41.04	Legislatively referred constitutional amendment
Amendment 7	Allows for the use of secret ballots in votes of employee representation and public votes on referendums and public office.	1,056,299	67.11	517,595	32.89	Legislatively referred constitutional amendment
Amendment 8	Provides that the compensation paid to legislators does not increase during term of office.	1,102,981	68.50	507,123	31.50	Legislatively referred constitutional amendment
Amendment 9	Allows the state legislature to implement business privilege tax on corporations.	880,606	57.80	642,927	42.20	Legislatively referred constitutional amendment
Amendment 10	Related to the authority of state legislature and banking in the state.	778,996	54.05	662,372	45.95	Legislatively referred constitutional amendment
Amendment 11	Prohibits any municipality outside of Lawrence County from imposing any municipal ordinance or regulation.	830,067	66.11	425,501	33.89	Legislatively referred constitutional amendment
Source: Alabama Secretary of State

Results by county

Amendment 1 (September) results by county
Yes:
- 50–60%
- 60–70%
- 70–80%
- 80–90%
- >90%
No:
- 50–60%

Amendment 1 (November) results by county
Yes:
- 50–60%
- 60–70%
- 70–80%
- 80–90%

Amendment 2 results by county
Yes:
- 50–60%
- 60–70%
- 70–80%
- 80–90%

Amendment 3 results by county
Yes:
- 50–60%
- 60–70%
- 70–80%
- 80–90%
No:
- 50–60%
- 70–80%

Amendment 4 results by county
Yes:
- 50–60%
No:
- 50–60%
- 60–70%
- 70–80%
- 80–90%

Amendment 5 results by county
Yes:
- 50–60%
- 60–70%
- 70–80%
No:
- 80–90%

Amendment 6 results by county
Yes:
- 50–60%
- 60–70%
- 70–80%
No:
- 50–60%
- 60–70%
- 70–80%

Amendment 7 results by county
Yes:
- 50–60%
- 60–70%
- 70–80%
- 80–90%
No:
- 50–60%
- 60–70%
- 70–80%

Amendment 8 results by county
Yes:
- 50–60%
- 60–70%
- 70–80%
- 80–90%
No:
- 50–60%
- 60–70%
- 70–80%

Amendment 9 results by county
Yes:
- 50–60%
- 60–70%
- 70–80%
No:
- 50–60%
- 60–70%

Amendment 10 results by county
Yes:
- 50–60%
- 60–70%
- 70–80%
No:
- 50–60%
- 60–70%

Amendment 11 results by county
Yes:
- 50–60%
- 60–70%
- 70–80%
No:
- 50–60%
- 60–70%
