= Napoleon Bracy Jr. =

American politician

Napoleon Bracy
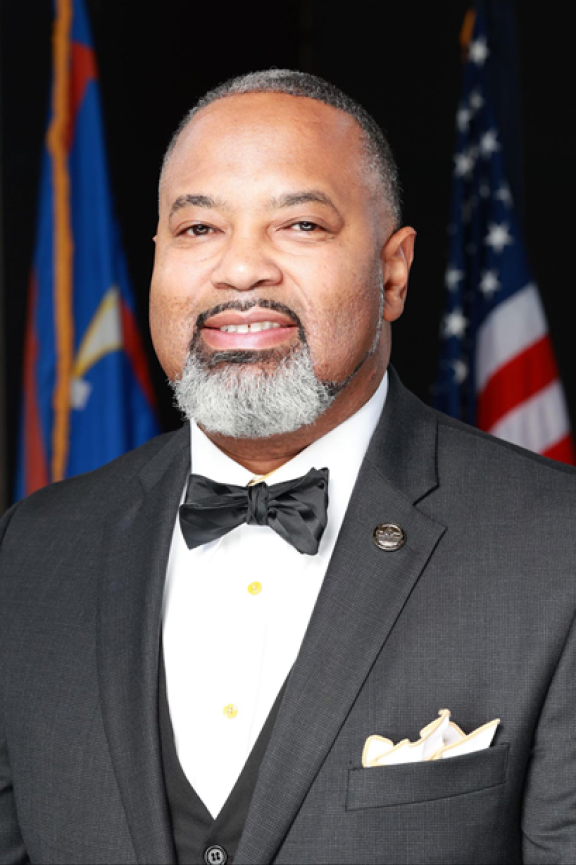

Member of the Alabama House of Representatives from the 98th district
- Incumbent
- Assumed office January 2011
- Preceded by: James Gordon

Personal details
- Born: 1976 or 1977 (age 48–49)
- Party: Democratic
- Spouse: Melody Bracy
- Children: 3 daughters
- Education: Dillard University (BA)

Napoleon Bracy Jr. (born 1976 or 1977) is an American politician. He serves as a Democratic member of the Alabama House of Representatives, representing Mobile County, Alabama. In May 2017, he opposed the bill for the Alabama Memorial Preservation Act, which would make it harder to remove Confederate monuments in Alabama; he argued, "People that sponsor bills like this don't care about me."

== Congressional race ==
In November 2023, Bracy announced his candidacy to represent Alabama's 2nd congressional district in the U.S. House of Representatives. He is running as a Democrat in the March 5, 2024, primary election.
