= Chris Beeker III =

American politician

Chris Beeker

Member of the Alabama Public Service Commission Place 2
- Incumbent
- Assumed office September 23, 2024
- Governor: Kay Ivey
- Preceded by: Chip Beeker

Personal details
- Born: Chris Beeker III Greene County, Alabama, U.S.
- Party: Republican
- Parent: Chris Beeker Jr.
- Education: University of Mississippi (BA)

Chris V. Beeker III is an American politician who is currently serving on the Alabama Public Service Commission (PSC). A member of the Alabama Republican Party, he was appointed in 2024.

== Career ==
Beeker was appointed to be the USDA Alabama State Director of Rural Development in 2017 by Donald Trump.

In September 2024, his father, Chip Beeker resigned from his position on the PSC. Beeker III was appointed as the replacement commissioner to serve out the rest of the term. He announced his intent to run for a full term in the 2026 election on July 14, 2025. He lost in the Republican primary runoff on June 16, 2026.

Political offices
Preceded by Chip Beeker	Member of the Alabama Public Service Commission; Place 2; 2024–present	Incumbent
