= Alabama Railroad Commission =

Government agency in Alabama, 1881–1915

Agency overview
- Formed: 1881
- Dissolved: 1915

The Alabama Railroad Commission was an elected board that managed railroads in Alabama. The commission was founded in 1881 was later replaced by the Alabama Public Service Commission in 1915.

== Responsibilities ==
The commission regulated freight rates on different products.

== Officeholders ==
Years
| Years | President | Place 1 | Place 2 |
|---|---|---|---|
| 1881 | Walter L. Bragg (D) | James Crook (D) | Charles P. Ball (D) |
| 1882 | Walter L. Bragg (D) | James Crook (D) | Charles P. Ball (D) |
| 1883 | Walter L. Bragg (D) | James Crook (D) | Charles P. Ball (D) |
| 1884 | Walter L. Bragg (D) | James Crook (D) | Charles P. Ball (D) |
| 1885 | Henry R. Shorter (D) | Levi W. Lawler (D) | Wiley C. Tunstall (D) |
| 1886 | Henry R. Shorter (D) | Levi W. Lawler (D) | Wiley C. Tunstall (D) |
| 1887 | Henry R. Shorter (D) | Levi W. Lawler (D) | Wiley C. Tunstall (D) |
| 1888 | Henry R. Shorter (D) | Levi W. Lawler (D) | Wiley C. Tunstall (D) |
| 1889 | Henry R. Shorter (D) | Levi W. Lawler (D) | Wiley C. Tunstall (D) |
| 1890 | Henry R. Shorter (D) | Levi W. Lawler (D) | Wiley C. Tunstall (D) |
| 1891 | Henry R. Shorter (D) | Levi W. Lawler (D) | Wiley C. Tunstall (D) |
| 1892 | Henry R. Shorter (D) | Levi W. Lawler (D) | Wiley C. Tunstall (D) |
| 1893 | Henry R. Shorter (D) | James T. Holtzclaw (D) | Wiley C. Tunstall (D) |
| 1893 | Henry R. Shorter (D) | Willis G. Clark (D) | Wiley C. Tunstall (D) |
| 1894 | Henry R. Shorter (D) | Willis G. Clark (D) | Wiley C. Tunstall (D) |
| 1895 | Henry R. Shorter (D) | Harvey E. Jones (D) | Ross C. Smith (D) |
| 1896 | Henry R. Shorter (D) | Harvey E. Jones (D) | Ross C. Smith (D) |
| 1897 | James Crook (D) | Harvey E. Jones (D) | Ross C. Smith (D) |
| 1898 | James Crook (D) | Harvey E. Jones (D) | Ross C. Smith (D) |
| 1899 | James Crook (D) | A. E. Caffee (D) | Osceola Kyle (D) |
| 1900 | James Crook (D) | A. E. Caffee (D) | Osceola Kyle (D) |
| 1901 | John V. Smith (D) | A. E. Caffee (D) | Wiley C. Tunstall (D) |
| 1902 | John V. Smith (D) | A. E. Caffee (D) | Wiley C. Tunstall (D) |
| 1903 | John V. Smith (D) | William T. Sanders (D) | Wiley C. Tunstall (D) |
| 1904 | John V. Smith (D) | William T. Sanders (D) | Wiley C. Tunstall (D) |
| 1905 | B. B. Comer (D) | William T. Sanders (D) | Wiley C. Tunstall (D) |
| 1906 | B. B. Comer (D) | William T. Sanders (D) | Wiley C. Tunstall (D) |
| 1907 | Charles Henderson (D) | William D. Nesbitt (D) | John G. Harris (D) |
| 1908 | Charles Henderson (D) | William D. Nesbitt (D) | John G. Harris (D) |
| 1908 | Charles Henderson (D) | William D. Nesbitt (D) | John A. Lusk (D) |
| 1909 | Charles Henderson (D) | William D. Nesbitt (D) | John A. Lusk (D) |
| 1910 | Charles Henderson (D) | William D. Nesbitt (D) | John A. Lusk (D) |
| 1911 | Charles Henderson (D) | Leon C. McCord (D) | Frank N. Julian (D) |
| 1912 | Charles Henderson (D) | Leon C. McCord (D) | Frank N. Julian (D) |
| 1913 | Charles Henderson (D) | Leon C. McCord (D) | Frank N. Julian (D) |
| 1914 | Charles Henderson (D) | Leon C. McCord (D) | Frank N. Julian (D) |
