= Twinkle Andress Cavanaugh =

American politician (born 1966)

Twinkle Cavanaugh
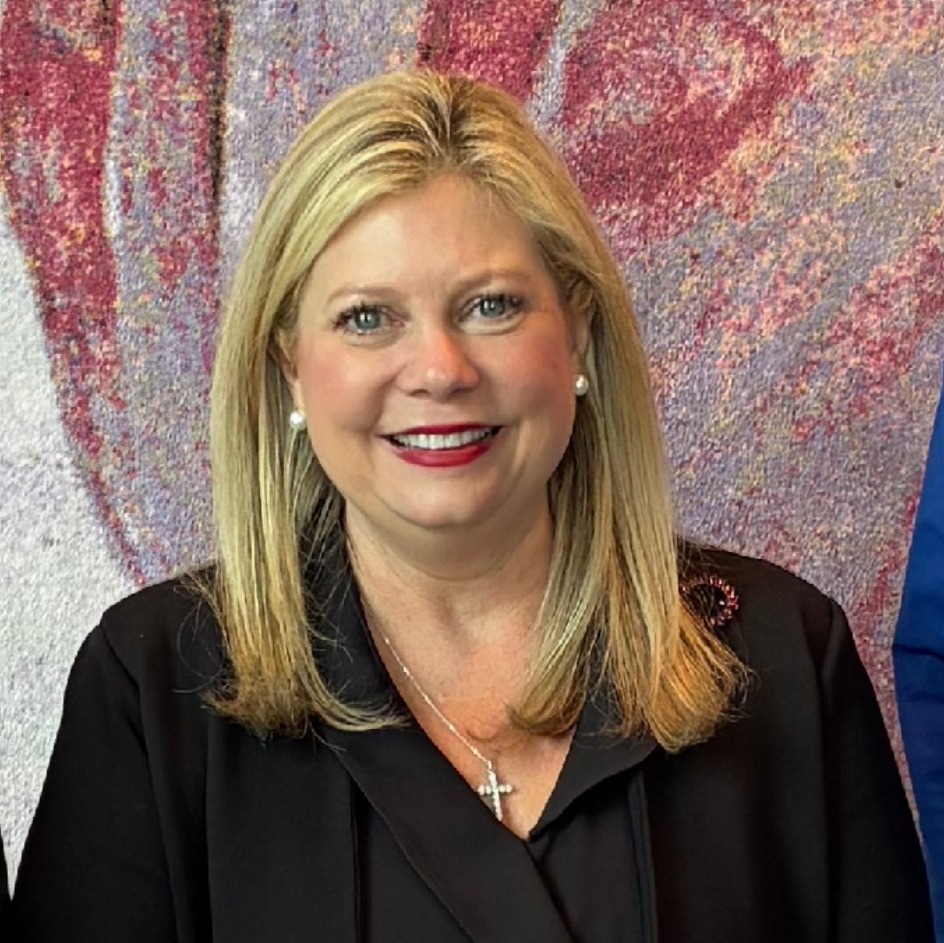

President of the Alabama Public Service Commission
- In office November 7, 2012 – June 1, 2025
- Governor: Robert J. Bentley; Kay Ivey
- Preceded by: Lucy Baxley
- Succeeded by: Cynthia Almond

Member of the Alabama Public Service Commission Place 1
- In office January 17, 2011 – November 7, 2012
- Governor: Robert J. Bentley
- Preceded by: Jan Cook
- Succeeded by: Jeremy Oden

Chair of the Alabama Republican Party
- In office February 12, 2005 – February 10, 2007
- Preceded by: Marty Connors
- Succeeded by: Mike Hubbard

Personal details
- Born: Twinkle Andress; March 10, 1966 (age 60)
- Party: Republican
- Spouse: Jeff Cavanaugh
- Children: 3
- Education: Auburn University (BA)

Twinkle Andress Cavanaugh (born March 10, 1966) is an American politician. A member of the Alabama Republican Party, she served as president of the Alabama Public Service Commission (PSC) from 2012 to 2025.

== Career ==
Cavanaugh served as the chair of the Alabama Republican Party from 2005 to 2007.

She was first elected to the PSC in 2010, and was elected as PSC president in 2012, defeating incumbent Democratic president Lucy Baxley. Under her leadership, the PSC has been criticized for its failure to improve high energy prices in the state.

She ran for Lieutenant Governor in 2018 and lost to Will Ainsworth.

In 2025, she was appointed to be the USDA state director of rural development by Donald Trump. She resigned as PSC president on June 1.

== Personal life ==
She is married to Jeff Cavanaugh, and has three children.

Party political offices
Preceded by Marty Connors	Chair of the Alabama Republican Party; 2005–2007	Succeeded by Mike Hubbard
Political offices
Preceded by Jan Cook	Member of the Alabama Public Service Commission; Place 1; 2011–2012	Succeeded by Jeremy Oden
Preceded by Lucy Baxley	President of the Alabama Public Service Commission; 2012–2025	Succeeded by Cynthia Almond
