= Jeremy Oden =

American politician

Member of the Alabama Public Service Commission Place 1
- Incumbent
- Assumed office December 3, 2012
- Governor: Robert J. Bentley; Kay Ivey
- Preceded by: Twinkle Cavanaugh

Member of the Alabama House of Representatives from the 11th district
- In office November 4, 1998 – December 3, 2012
- Preceded by: Tom Drake
- Succeeded by: Randall Shedd

Personal details
- Born: October 7, 1968 (age 57) Birmingham, Alabama, U.S.
- Party: Republican
- Education: Asbury University (BA); Asbury Theological Seminary (attended)

Jeremy H. Oden (born October 7, 1968) is an American politician and is a member of the Republican Party. Oden is the current Place 1 Commissioner on the Alabama Public Service Commission. Prior to joining the PSC, Oden was a member of the Alabama House of Representatives. He was first elected to the State House in 1998 and resigned effective December 3, 2012. He had previously run unsuccessfully for the state house in 1994.

Oden was appointed to a vacancy on the Alabama Public Service Commission by Governor Robert J. Bentley at the beginning of December 2012. Previously, Oden was elected as a member of the Alabama House of Representatives. A lifelong member of the Republican Party, he was first elected to the State House in 1998 and represented District 11 (Cullman, Morgan, and Blount counties) until his appointment to the PSC.

Before his appointment, Oden worked in the financial industry as a Branch Manager and Vice President for Eva Bank in Cullman, Alabama. He was also a small business owner, primarily involved in the construction industry. Oden is a proud Christian and an ordained minister. He holds a bachelor's degree from Asbury University as well as two years of post-graduate Seminary studies.

Commissioner Oden represents the State of Alabama on various committees including the Eastern Interconnection States’ Planning Council (EISPC), the Nuclear Waste Strategy Coalition (NWSC), and the Electricity Committee of the National Association of Regulatory Utility Commissioners (NARUC) among others.

Political offices
Preceded by Twinkle Cavanaugh	Member of the Alabama Public Service Commission; Place 1; 2012–present	Incumbent
