= Chip Brown =

American politician

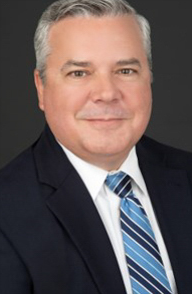

Member of the Alabama House of Representatives from the 105th district
- Incumbent
- Assumed office November 7, 2018
- Preceded by: David Sessions

Personal details
- Born: Alabama, U.S.
- Party: Republican
- Spouse: Aimee
- Children: 1
- Education: Troy University (BS); National University (MA)

Military service
- Branch/service: United States Army
- Years of service: 2001–2009
- Unit: Alabama National Guard
- Battles/wars: War in Afghanistan

Chip Brown is an American politician serving as a Republican member of the Alabama House of Representatives from the 105th district. He assumed office on November 7, 2018.

== Early life and education ==
Brown was born and raised in Alabama. He earned a Bachelor of Science degree in history and political science from Troy University in 1992 and a Master of Arts in strategic communication from National University in 2018.

== Career ==
Brown served in active duty as a member of the Alabama National Guard from 2001 to 2009. During his service, he was assigned to the United States Central Command. He also served as a military advisor to the International Security Assistance Force and US Forces Afghanistan Forward in Kabul. After retiring from the military, Brown worked as a project manager for Proctor Environmental Engineering. He also worked as the director of corporate public relations for Volkert, Inc. He was elected to the Alabama House of Representatives in November 2018. Since 2021, he has also worked as a real estate advisor.
