= Chris Beeker Jr. =

American politician

Chip Beeker

Member of the Alabama Public Service Commission Place 2
- In office January 19, 2015 – September 23, 2024
- Governor: Robert J. Bentley; Kay Ivey
- Preceded by: Terry Dunn
- Succeeded by: Chris Beeker

Personal details
- Born: Chris Beeker Jr. 1947 or 1948 (age 77–78)
- Party: Republican
- Education: University of West Alabama (BA)

Chris "Chip" Beeker Jr. (born 1947/1948) is an American politician who served on the Alabama Public Service Commission from 2015 to 2024 as a member of the Alabama Republican Party. He was first elected in 2014, and was re-elected in 2018 and 2022. He resigned in September 2024 over health concerns, and was replaced by his son, Chris Beeker III. He also served on the Greene County Commission from 1986 to 2006.

Political offices
| Preceded by Terry Dunn | Member of the Alabama Public Service Commission; Place 2; 2015–2024 | Succeeded by Chris Beeker |
