= Alabama Public Service Commission =

American government agency formed in 1915

Commission overview
- Formed: 1915
- Preceding Commission: Alabama Railroad Commission
- Commission executive: Cynthia Almond, President
- Website: Alabama Public Service Commission Website

The Alabama Public Service Commission, commonly called the PSC, was established by an act of the Alabama Legislature in 1915 to primarily replace the State Railroad Commission. The PSC's responsibility was expanded in 1920 to include regulating and setting rates that utility companies charge their customers for electricity. The legislature expanded the PSC's responsibilities in later years to include those companies that provide gas, water, and communications, as well as transportation common carriers such as trucking and air carriers. The PSC effectively determines the rate of profits that most of these companies are allowed to earn. However, some of its traditional responsibilities have passed to the federal government with the passage of the Federal Aviation Act of 1994 and the Federal Communications Act of 1996.

== Election of commissioners ==
The Alabama Public Service Commission is composed of three elected members, a President and two associate commissioners. They run statewide in partisan elections and each serves a 4-year term. When vacancies occur they are filled by appointment by the Governor of Alabama. There is no limit to the number of terms to which they may be elected. The President of the Commission is elected in presidential election years, and the two associate commissioners are elected during midterm years (2022, 2026, etc).

== Current commissioners ==
Seat	Name	Party	Start	Next Election
President	Cynthia Almond	Republican	June 16, 2025 (appointed)	2028
Place 1	Jeremy Oden	Republican	December 3, 2012 (appointed)	2026 (primaried)
Place 2	Chris Beeker	Republican	September 23, 2024 (appointed)	2026 (primaried)

Recent Associate Commissioner Twinkle Andress Cavanaugh was elected to the Presidency of the PSC on November 6, 2012, when she defeated one term incumbent Democrat Lucy Baxley. Baxley had been the only remaining statewide elected Democrat still in office in Alabama and was first elected in 2008, with a margin of about 10,000 votes which translated into 50.3% of the vote over Cavanaugh. Baxley previously served as Alabama State Treasurer and Lieutenant Governor before losing a race for governor to Bob Riley in 2006. Cavanaugh won her third term as President of the PSC on November 3, 2020 with over 60% of the vote.

Cavanaugh, in defeating Baxley in 2012, won just over 55% of the ballots cast and had a margin of about 100,000 votes. She had previously served as both Executive Director and later was elected as the first female Chair of the Alabama Republican Party. She was initially elected to the Commission on November 2, 2010, in her third campaign for statewide office. She defeated long-time commissioner Jan Cook with 56% of the vote and a margin of more than 186,000 votes. The seat that Cavanaugh vacated for the PSC Presidency was filled for the remainder of her term by an appointee by Governor Robert J. Bentley. In July 2014, Cavanaugh called on the people of Alabama to pray for God's intervention to prevent the EPA's proposed regulations for coal-power plants from taking effect, stating that the EPA was attempting to take "what God's given a state" from the people of Alabama.

Commissioner Chip Beeker was elected in 2014 when he defeated incumbent Republican Terry Dunn in the GOP primary runoff on July 15, 2014. Beeker was unopposed in the general election that November and was re-elected again on November 6, 2018.

Commissioner Jeremy H. Oden was appointed to a vacancy on the PSC by Governor Robert Bentley at the beginning of December 2012 to the seat vacated by Cavanaugh upon her election to the PSC Presidency. Oden had served in the Alabama House of Representatives from 1998 until his appointment. Commissioner Oden was nominated on June 3, 2014 for a full four-year term. Oden was unopposed in the general election. He was re-elected again on November 6, 2018 following a very narrow primary victory in June, 2018.

Commissioner Cynthia Almond was appointed in June 2025 by Governor Kay Ivey following the resignation of commission president Twinkle Andress Cavanaugh.

== History and prior commissioners ==
Sometimes, the commission served as a stepping stone to run for higher offices in the state, although not always successfully. Commissioners B. B. Comer and Gordon Persons moved from the PSC to the office of governor. Long-time Commissioner C.C. "Jack" Owen unsuccessfully ran for governor from the PSC. In 2018, Commission President Twinkle Cavanaugh ran an unsuccessful campaign for the Republican nomination for Lt. Governor losing to Will Ainsworth who went on to win the office.

Commissioner Jim Folsom Jr. was elected Lieutenant Governor in 1986 and was re-elected in 1990. He was elevated to the governor's office in 1993 upon the felony conviction of Gov. Guy Hunt. As an incumbent, he was defeated in the gubernatorial election in 1994 by Republican Fob James. Folsom stayed out of elective politics for 12 years. Folsom returned to public office with his 2006 election to the office of Lieutenant Governor. He was again defeated for re-election in 2010 when he lost the Lieutenant Governor post to Republican Kay Ivey. Folsom is the son and namesake of two-time Alabama governor James E. "Big Jim" Folsom, famous for being a progressive on civil rights when it was unpopular to be so.

Commissioner Jim Zeigler served a single term on the PSC. He was elected State Auditor in November, 2014 and on January 19, 2015 returned to statewide office. He is a vocal opponent of what he terms "wasteful government spending" and a critic of Governor Robert Bentley. In 1946, Jimmy Hitchcock parlayed his earlier fame as an Auburn University football player and major league baseball player to a seat on the Commission and served there until his death in 1959.

One of the most infamous and colorful politicians in Alabama was Commissioner Eugene "Bull" Connor, a Democrat who had earlier served as police commissioner in Birmingham. He made national news when he ordered the police to use dogs and fire hoses on civil rights demonstrators during the Civil Rights protests in the 1960s. He lost a race for governor in 1970 in the Democratic primary to eventual nominee, George Wallace.

Commissioner Ed Pepper and his wife were killed in the worst fire in Alabama history in 1966. The Dale's Penthouse restaurant fire in Montgomery took 26 lives. He was the nephew of well-known U.S. Senator and Congressman Claude Pepper of Florida, an Alabama native. The long-serving Claude Pepper became a national spokesman for senior citizens.

Two commissioners were convicted of felony offenses while serving and were automatically removed from office—Juanita McDaniel and Kenneth "Bozo" Hammond. Hammond later was elected Mayor of his native Valley Head, Alabama.

Sibyl Pool became the first of six women to serve on the PSC when she took office in January, 1955. Three of those women have been President of the PSC.

Hammond, Lynn Greer, and Pete Matthews all had previously served in the Alabama Legislature as Democrats and a fourth, Jeremy Oden, was a Republican state legislator at the time of his appointment. Greer later lost a race for Congress in north Alabama's Tennessee Valley district. Greer was then three times elected to the state legislature again as recently as 2014 as a Republican.

In 2026, a bill was introduced to end elections to the commission and instead make all three seats appointed. The bill, HB 475, was significantly altered to match the text of SB 360, including:

- expand the APSC from three to seven members, with commissioners elected from Alabama's congressional districts
- allow the governor to appoint four members to remain until the next scheduled APSC election.
- create a cabinet-level Secretary of Energy appointed by the governor
- freeze electric base rates

The bill was signed into law by Ivey on April 2, 2026.

=== Commissioner history ===
Years
Years	President	Place 1	Place 2
1915	Samuel P. Kennedy (D)	Blucher H. Cooper (D)	Samuel P. Gaillard (D)
1916	Samuel P. Kennedy (D)	Blucher H. Cooper (D)	Samuel P. Gaillard (D)
1917	Samuel P. Kennedy (D)	Blucher H. Cooper (D)	Samuel P. Gaillard (D)
1918	Samuel P. Kennedy (D)	Blucher H. Cooper (D)	Samuel P. Gaillard (D)
1919	Samuel P. Kennedy (D)	Blucher H. Cooper (D)	Samuel P. Gaillard (D)
1920	Samuel P. Kennedy (D)	Blucher H. Cooper (D)	Samuel P. Gaillard (D)
1921	Samuel P. Kennedy (D)	Blucher H. Cooper (D)	Samuel P. Gaillard (D)
1922	Samuel P. Kennedy (D)	Blucher H. Cooper (D)	Samuel P. Gaillard (D)
1923	Andrew G. Patterson (D)	Fitzhugh Lee (D)	Frank P. Morgan (D)
1924	Andrew G. Patterson (D)	Fitzhugh Lee (D)	Frank P. Morgan (D)
1925	Andrew G. Patterson (D)	Fitzhugh Lee (D)	Frank P. Morgan (D)
1926	Andrew G. Patterson (D)	Fitzhugh Lee (D)	Frank P. Morgan (D)
1927	Hugh S. White (D)	Fitzhugh Lee (D)	Frank P. Morgan (D)
1928	Hugh S. White (D)	Fitzhugh Lee (D)	Frank P. Morgan (D)
1929	Hugh S. White (D)	Fitzhugh Lee (D)	Frank P. Morgan (D)
1930	Hugh S. White (D)	Fitzhugh Lee (D)	Frank P. Morgan (D)
1931	Hugh S. White (D)	Fitzhugh Lee (D)	Frank P. Morgan (D)
1932	Hugh S. White (D)	Fitzhugh Lee (D)	Frank P. Morgan (D)
1933	Hugh S. White (D)	Fitzhugh Lee (D)	Frank P. Morgan (D)
1934	Hugh S. White (D)	Fitzhugh Lee (D)	Frank P. Morgan (D)
1935	Hugh S. White (D)	Fitzhugh Lee (D)	Frank P. Morgan (D)
1936	Hugh S. White (D)	Fitzhugh Lee (D)	Frank P. Morgan (D)
1936	Hugh S. White (D)	Fitzhugh Lee (D)	W. Clint Harrison (D)
1937	Hugh S. White (D)	Fitzhugh Lee (D)	W. Clint Harrison (D)
1938	Hugh S. White (D)	Fitzhugh Lee (D)	W. Clint Harrison (D)
1939	Hugh S. White (D)	Fitzhugh Lee (D)	W. Clint Harrison (D)
1940	Hugh S. White (D)	Fitzhugh Lee (D)	W. Clint Harrison (D)
1941	Hugh S. White (D)	Fitzhugh Lee (D)	W. Clint Harrison (D)
1942	Hugh S. White (D)	Fitzhugh Lee (D)	W. Clint Harrison (D)
1943	Hugh S. White (D)	Gordon Persons (D)	W. Clint Harrison (D)
1944	Hugh S. White (D)	Gordon Persons (D)	W. Clint Harrison (D)
1945	Gordon Persons (D)	James Perdue (D)	W. Clint Harrison (D)
1946	Gordon Persons (D)	James Perdue (D)	W. Clint Harrison (D)
1947	Gordon Persons (D)	Jimmy Hitchcock (D)	C. C. (Jack) Owen (D)
1948	Gordon Persons (D)	Jimmy Hitchcock (D)	C. C. (Jack) Owen (D)
1949	Gordon Persons (D)	Jimmy Hitchcock (D)	C. C. (Jack) Owen (D)
1950	Gordon Persons (D)	Jimmy Hitchcock (D)	C. C. (Jack) Owen (D)
1951	C. C. (Jack) Owen (D)	Jimmy Hitchcock (D)	T. O. Walker (D)
1952	C. C. (Jack) Owen (D)	Jimmy Hitchcock (D)	T. O. Walker (D)
1953	C. C. (Jack) Owen (D)	Jimmy Hitchcock (D)	T. O. Walker (D)
1954	C. C. (Jack) Owen (D)	Jimmy Hitchcock (D)	T. O. Walker (D)
1955	C. C. (Jack) Owen (D)	Jimmy Hitchcock (D)	Sibyl Pool (D)
1956	C. C. (Jack) Owen (D)	Jimmy Hitchcock (D)	Sibyl Pool (D)
1957	C. C. (Jack) Owen (D)	Jimmy Hitchcock (D)	Sibyl Pool (D)
1958	C. C. (Jack) Owen (D)	Jimmy Hitchcock (D)	Sibyl Pool (D)
1959	C. C. (Jack) Owen (D)	Jimmy Hitchcock (D)	Sibyl Pool (D)
1959	C. C. (Jack) Owen (D)	Ralph Smith Jr. (D)	Sibyl Pool (D)
1960	C. C. (Jack) Owen (D)	Ralph Smith Jr. (D)	Sibyl Pool (D)
1960	C. C. (Jack) Owen (D)	Joe Foster (D)	Sibyl Pool (D)
1961	C. C. (Jack) Owen (D)	Joe Foster (D)	Sibyl Pool (D)
1962	C. C. (Jack) Owen (D)	Joe Foster (D)	Sibyl Pool (D)
1963	C. C. (Jack) Owen (D)	Ed Pepper (D)	Sibyl Pool (D)
1964	C. C. (Jack) Owen (D)	Ed Pepper (D)	Sibyl Pool (D)
1965	T. Eugene (Bull) Connor (D)	Ed Pepper (D)	Sibyl Pool (D)
1966	T. Eugene (Bull) Connor (D)	Ed Pepper (D)	Sibyl Pool (D)
1967	T. Eugene (Bull) Connor (D)	C. C. (Jack) Owen (D)	Sibyl Pool (D)
1968	T. Eugene (Bull) Connor (D)	C. C. (Jack) Owen (D)	Sibyl Pool (D)
1969	T. Eugene (Bull) Connor (D)	C. C. (Jack) Owen (D)	Sibyl Pool (D)
1970	T. Eugene (Bull) Connor (D)	C. C. (Jack) Owen (D)	Sibyl Pool (D)
1971	T. Eugene (Bull) Connor (D)	C. C. (Jack) Owen (D)	Juanita W. McDaniel (D)
1972	T. Eugene (Bull) Connor (D)	C. C. (Jack) Owen (D)	Juanita W. McDaniel (D)
1973	Kenneth (Bozo) Hammond (D)	C. C. (Jack) Owen (D)	Juanita W. McDaniel (D)
1974	Kenneth (Bozo) Hammond (D)	C. C. (Jack) Owen (D)	Juanita W. McDaniel (D)
1975	Kenneth (Bozo) Hammond (D)	Jim Zeigler (D)	Juanita W. McDaniel (D)
1976	C. C. (Chris) Whatley (D)	Jim Zeigler (D)	Juanita W. McDaniel (D)
1977	Juanita W. McDaniel (D)	Jim Zeigler (D)	C. C. (Chris) Whatley (D)
1978	Juanita W. McDaniel (D)	Jim Zeigler (D)	C. C. (Chris) Whatley (D)
1979	Juanita W. McDaniel (D)	Pete Matthews (D)	Jim Folsom Jr. (D)
1980	William J. Samford Jr. (D)	Pete Matthews (D)	Jim Folsom Jr. (D)
1981	Billy Joe Camp (D)	Lynn Greer (D)	Jim Folsom Jr. (D)
1982	Billy Joe Camp (D)	Lynn Greer (D)	Jim Folsom Jr. (D)
1983	Jim Sullivan (D)	Lynn Greer (D)	Jim Folsom Jr. (D)
1984	Jim Sullivan (D)	Lynn Greer (D)	Jim Folsom Jr. (D)
1985	Jim Sullivan (D)	Lynn Greer (D)	Jim Folsom Jr. (D)
1986	Jim Sullivan (D)	Lynn Greer (D)	Jim Folsom Jr. (D)
1987	Jim Sullivan (D)	Lynn Greer (D)	Charles Martin (D)
1988	Jim Sullivan (D)	Lynn Greer (D)	Charles Martin (D)
1989	Jim Sullivan (D)	Lynn Greer (D)	Charles Martin (D)
1990	Jim Sullivan (D)	Lynn Greer (D)	Charles Martin (D)
1991	Jim Sullivan (D)	Jan Cook (D)	Charles Martin (D)
1992	Jim Sullivan (D)	Jan Cook (D)	Charles Martin (D)
1993	Jim Sullivan (D)	Jan Cook (D)	Charles Martin (D)
1994	Jim Sullivan (D)	Jan Cook (D)	Charles Martin (D)
1995	Jim Sullivan (R)	Jan Cook (D)	Charles Martin (D)
1996	Jim Sullivan (R)	Jan Cook (D)	Charles Martin (D)
1997	Jim Sullivan (R)	Jan Cook (D)	Charles Martin (D)
1998	Jim Sullivan (R)	Jan Cook (D)	Charles Martin (D)
1999	Jim Sullivan (R)	Jan Cook (D)	George Wallace Jr. (R)
2000	Jim Sullivan (R)	Jan Cook (D)	George Wallace Jr. (R)
2001	Jim Sullivan (R)	Jan Cook (D)	George Wallace Jr. (R)
2002	Jim Sullivan (R)	Jan Cook (D)	George Wallace Jr. (R)
2003	Jim Sullivan (R)	Jan Cook (D)	George Wallace Jr. (R)
2004	Jim Sullivan (R)	Jan Cook (D)	George Wallace Jr. (R)
2005	Jim Sullivan (R)	Jan Cook (D)	George Wallace Jr. (R)
2006	Jim Sullivan (R)	Jan Cook (D)	George Wallace Jr. (R)
2007	Jim Sullivan (R)	Jan Cook (D)	Susan Parker (D)
2008	Jim Sullivan (R)	Jan Cook (D)	Susan Parker (D)
2009	Lucy Baxley (D)	Jan Cook (D)	Susan Parker (D)
2010	Lucy Baxley (D)	Jan Cook (D)	Susan Parker (D)
2011	Lucy Baxley (D)	Twinkle Andress Cavanaugh (R)	Terry L. Dunn (R)
2012	Lucy Baxley (D)	Twinkle Andress Cavanaugh (R)	Terry L. Dunn (R)
2013	Twinkle Andress Cavanaugh (R)	Jeremy H. Oden (R)	Terry L. Dunn (R)
2014	Twinkle Andress Cavanaugh (R)	Jeremy H. Oden (R)	Terry L. Dunn (R)
2015	Twinkle Andress Cavanaugh (R)	Jeremy H. Oden (R)	Chip Beeker (R)
2016	Twinkle Andress Cavanaugh (R)	Jeremy H. Oden (R)	Chip Beeker (R)
2017	Twinkle Andress Cavanaugh (R)	Jeremy H. Oden (R)	Chip Beeker (R)
2018	Twinkle Andress Cavanaugh (R)	Jeremy H. Oden (R)	Chip Beeker (R)
2019	Twinkle Andress Cavanaugh (R)	Jeremy H. Oden (R)	Chip Beeker (R)
2020	Twinkle Andress Cavanaugh (R)	Jeremy H. Oden (R)	Chip Beeker (R)
2021	Twinkle Andress Cavanaugh (R)	Jeremy H. Oden (R)	Chip Beeker (R)
2022	Twinkle Andress Cavanaugh (R)	Jeremy H. Oden (R)	Chip Beeker (R)
2023	Twinkle Andress Cavanaugh (R)	Jeremy H. Oden (R)	Chip Beeker (R)
2024	Twinkle Andress Cavanaugh (R)	Jeremy H. Oden (R)	Chris Beeker III (R)
2025	Cynthia Almond (R)	Jeremy H. Oden (R)	Chris Beeker III (R)
Years
Years	President	Place 1	Place 2

== See also ==
- Government of Alabama
- Public Utilities Commission
