= 2020 Alabama elections =

Alabama state elections in 2020 were held on Tuesday, November 3, 2020. Its primary elections were held on March 3, 2020, with runoffs taking place on July 31.

In addition to the U.S. presidential race, Alabama voters elected the class II U.S. senator from Alabama, 4 of 9 members of the Alabama State Board of Education, all of its seats to the House of Representatives, 2 of 9 seats on the Supreme Court of Alabama, 4 of 10 seats on the Alabama Appellate Court and one seat of the Alabama House of Representatives. They also voted on five ballot measures.

To vote by mail, registered Alabama voters must have requested a ballot by October 29, 2020. As of early October some 130,576 voters had requested mail ballots.

== Federal offices ==
=== President of the United States ===
Alabama has 9 electoral votes in the Electoral College. Donald Trump won all of them with 62% of the popular vote.

=== United States class II Senate seat ===
Republican Tommy Tuberville defeated incumbent Democrat Doug Jones, winning 60% of the vote.

=== United States House of Representatives ===
There were five U.S. Representatives in Alabama that were up for election in addition to two open seats. 6 seats were won by the Republicans while 1 seat was won by the Democrats. No congressional districts changed hands.

== Public Service Commission ==
=== President ===
Incumbent Twinkle Andress Cavanaugh won re-election to a third term as Alabama Public Service Commission President and fourth term overall.

== State Board of Education ==
4 of 9 seats of the Alabama State Board of Education are up for election (one is a non-elected position held by the governor). Before the election the composition of that board was:

Party	# of seats
Republican	7
Democratic	1
Independent	1
Total	9

=== Member, District 1 ===
==== Candidates ====
Both Democratic & Republican are cancelled respectively.

- Tom Holmes (Democratic)
- Jackie Zeigler, incumbent (Republican)

==== General election ====
General election results
Party	Candidate	Votes	%
Republican	Jackie Zeigler (incumbent)	212,461	72.73%
Democratic	Tom Holmes	79,380	27.17%
Write-in		294	0.1%
Total votes		292,135	100%

=== Member, District 3 ===
==== Candidates ====
Both Democratic & Republican are cancelled respectively.

- Jarralynne Agee (Democratic)
- Stephanie Bell, incumbent (Republican)

==== General election ====
General election results
Party	Candidate	Votes	%
Republican	Stephanie Bell (incumbent)	209,909	68.92%
Democratic	Jarralynne Agee	94,375	30.99%
Write-in		278	0.09%
Total votes		304,562	100%

=== Member, District 5 ===
==== Republican primary ====
- Lesa Keith

==== Democratic primary ====
Democratic primary results
Party	Candidate	Votes	%
Democratic	Fred F. Bell	24,589	30.35
Democratic	Tonya Smith Chestnut	16,044	19.8
Democratic	Billie Jean Young	11,271	13.91
Democratic	Ron Davis	8,957	11.05
Democratic	Pamela Laffitte	6,712	8.28
Democratic	Patrice McClammy	5,932	7.32
Democratic	Woodie Pugh Jr.	5,696	7.03
Democratic	Joanne Shum	1,830	2.26
Total votes		81,031	100

Democratic primary runoff results
Party	Candidate	Votes	%
Democratic	Tonya Smith Chestnut	21,230	61.35
Democratic	Fred F. Bell	13,372	38.65
Total votes		34,602	100

==== General election ====
General election results
Party	Candidate	Votes	%
Democratic	Tonya Smith Chestnut (incumbent)	161,192	62.71%
Republican	Lesa Keith	95,593	37.19%
Write-in		245	0.10%
Total votes		257,030	100%

=== Member, District 7 ===
==== General election ====
General election results
Party	Candidate	Votes	%
Republican	Belinda Palmer McRae	230,122	98.73%
Write-in		2,957	1.27%
Total votes		233,079	100%

== State judiciary ==
Two seats on the Alabama Supreme Court and two seats each on the Alabama Court of Civil Appeals and the Alabama Court of Criminal Appeals were up for election, all of which were held by Republicans. Of these four had contested primaries.

=== State Supreme Court, Place 1 ===
==== Democratic primary ====
No candidates filed for election to this seat.

==== Republican primary ====
===== Candidates =====
- Greg Shaw, incumbent.
- Cam Ward, state senator.

===== Polling =====
Poll source	Date(s) administered	Sample size (Note: Key: A – all adults RV – registered voters LV – likely voters V – unclear)	Margin of error	Greg Shaw	Cam Ward	Undecided
Mason-Dixon	February 4–6, 2020	400 (LV)	± 5.0%	24%	19%	57%

===== Primary results =====
Republican primary results
Party	Candidate	Votes	%
Republican	Greg Shaw (incumbent)	344,049	58.39%
Republican	Cam Ward	245,184	41.61%
Total votes		589,233	100%

==== General election ====
2020 Alabama Supreme Court Place 1 election
Party	Candidate	Votes	%
Republican	Greg Shaw (incumbent)	1,554,369	97.58%
Write-in		38,502	2.42%
Total votes		1,592,871	100%

=== Court of Civil Appeals, Place 2 ===
Incumbent judge Scott Donaldson decided not to seek re-election.

==== Democratic primary ====
No candidates filed for election to this seat.

==== Republican primary ====
===== Candidates =====
- Matt Fridy, state representative.
- Philip Bahakel, judge.

===== Primary results =====
Republican primary results
Party	Candidate	Votes	%
Republican	Matt Fridy	353,024	66.02%
Republican	Philip Bahakel	181,717	33.98%
Total votes		534,741	100%

==== General election ====
2020 Alabama Court of Civil Appeals Place 2 election
Party	Candidate	Votes	%
Republican	Matt Fridy	1,539,415	97.72%
Write-in		35,890	2.28%
Total votes		1,575,305	100%
Republican hold			

=== Court of Criminal Appeals, Place 1 ===
==== Democratic primary ====
No candidates filed for election to this seat.

==== Republican primary ====
===== Candidates =====
- Mary Windom, incumbent.
- Melvin Hasting, attorney.

===== Primary results =====
Republican primary results
Party	Candidate	Votes	%
Republican	Mary Windom (incumbent)	387,876	69.45%
Republican	Melvin Hasting	170,599	30.55%
Total votes		558,475	100%

==== General election ====
2020 Alabama Court of Criminal Appeals Place 1 election
Party	Candidate	Votes	%
Republican	Mary Windom (incumbent)	1,541,862	97.72%
Write-in		34,708	2.28%
Total votes		1,576,570	100%

=== Court of Criminal Appeals, Place 2 ===
==== Democratic primary ====
No candidates filed for election to this seat.

==== Republican primary ====
===== Candidates =====
- J. Elizabeth Kellum ,incumbent.
- Jill Ganus, judge.
- William Smith, county commissioner⁣.

===== Primary results =====
Republican primary results (first round)
Party	Candidate	Votes	%
Republican	J. Elizabeth Kellum (incumbent)	232,303	43.37%
Republican	Willian Smith	198,663	37.09%
Republican	Jill Ganus	104,680	19.54%
Total votes		535,646	100%

Republican primary runoff results
Party	Candidate	Votes	%
Republican	J. Elizabeth Kellum (incumbent)	270,306	55.73%
Republican	William Smith	214,764	44.27%
Total votes		485,070	100%

==== General election ====
2020 Alabama Court of Criminal Appeals Place 2 election
Party	Candidate	Votes	%
Republican	J. Elizabeth Kellum (incumbent)	1,537,451	97.83%
Write-in		34,128	2.17%
Total votes		1,571,579	100%

== State House of Representatives ==
A special election had been called on November 17 for the 49th District as a result of Republican incumbent April Weaver resigning from the legislature. Primaries were held on August 4 that year, with a Republican runoff set for September 1. Alabaster City Councilmember Russell Bedsole won the general election against Democratic challenger Cheryl Patton.

=== Republican primary ===
Republican primary results (first round)
Party	Candidate	Votes	%
Republican	Russell Bedsole	923	34.84
Republican	Mimi Penhale	829	31.30
Republican	Chuck Martin	646	24.39
Republican	Donna Strong	177	6.68
Republican	Jackson McNeely	57	2.15
Republican	James Dean	17	0.64
Total votes		2,649	100

Republican primary runoff results
Party	Candidate	Votes	%
Republican	Russell Bedsole	1,250	51.33
Republican	Mimi Penhale	1,185	48.67
Total votes		2,435	100

=== Democratic nominee ===
- Cheryl Patton, real estate operative.

=== General election ===
2020 Alabama's 49th House of Representatives district special election
Party	Candidate	Votes	%
Republican	Russell Bedsole	1,599	63.18
Democratic	Cheryl Patton	930	36.74
Write-in		2	0.08
Total votes		2,531	100.0
Republican hold			

== Ballot measures ==
A total of seven statewide ballot measures appeared on the ballot, one in March and six in November.

=== Polling ===
==== For March 2020 Amendment ====
Poll source	Date(s) administered	Sample size	Margin of error	For March Amendment	Against March Amendment	Undecided
Mason-Dixon/Alabama; Daily News/WBRC/WAFF	February 4–6, 2020	625 (RV)	± 4%	38%	41%	21%

=== Summary ===
2020 Alabama ballot measures
Name	Description	Votes				Type
Name	Description	Yes	%	No	%	Type
Amendment 1 (March)	Reforms the state education board, including requiring members to be appointed by the governor.	277,320	24.88	837,234	75.12	Legislatively referred constitutional amendment
Amendment 1 (November)	Allows only a U.S. citizen who is 18 years old or older to vote in Alabama.	1,535,862	77.01	458,487	22.09	Legislatively referred constitutional amendment
Amendment 2	Makes certain changes to judicial law and court systems and procedures.	881,145	48.94	919,380	51.06	Legislatively referred constitutional amendment
Amendment 3	Provides that a judge, other than a probate judge, appointed to fill a vacancy would serve an initial term until the first Monday after the second Tuesday in January following the next general election after the judge has completed two years in office.	1,193,532	64.84	647,305	35.16	Legislatively referred constitutional amendment
Amendment 4	Authorizes the state legislature during the 2022 regular session to recompile the Constitution of Alabama and provide for its ratification.	1,222,682	66.82	607,090	33.18	Legislatively referred constitutional amendment
Amendment 5	Provides for a "Stand Your Ground" law applicable to individuals in churches in Franklin County.	1,213,544	71.61	481,088	28.39	Legislatively referred constitutional amendment
Amendment 6	Provides for a "Stand Your Ground" law applicable to individuals in churches in Lauderdale County.	1,216,008	71.61	482,189	28.39	Legislatively referred constitutional amendment
Source: Alabama Secretary of State

Results by county

Amendment 1 (March) results by county
No:
- 60–70%
- 70–80%
- 80–90%

Amendment 1 (November) results by county
Yes:
- 50–60%
- 60–70%
- 70–80%
- 80–90%
No:
- 50–60%

Amendment 2 results by county
Yes:
- 50–60%
No:
- 50–60%
- 60–70%
- 70–80%

Amendment 3 results by county
Yes:
- 50–60%
- 60–70%
- 70–80%
No:
- 50–60%
- 60–70%

Amendment 4 results by county
Yes:
- 50–60%
- 60–70%
- 70–80%
No:
- 50–60%

Amendment 5 results by county
Yes:
- 50–60%
- 60–70%
- 70–80%
- 80–90%
No:
- 50–60%
- 60–70%

Amendment 6 results by county
Yes:
- 50–60%
- 60–70%
- 70–80%
- 80–90%
No:
- 50–60%
- 60–70%

== Notes ==
Partisan clients
