= Bill Lewis (judge) =

American judge (born 1978)

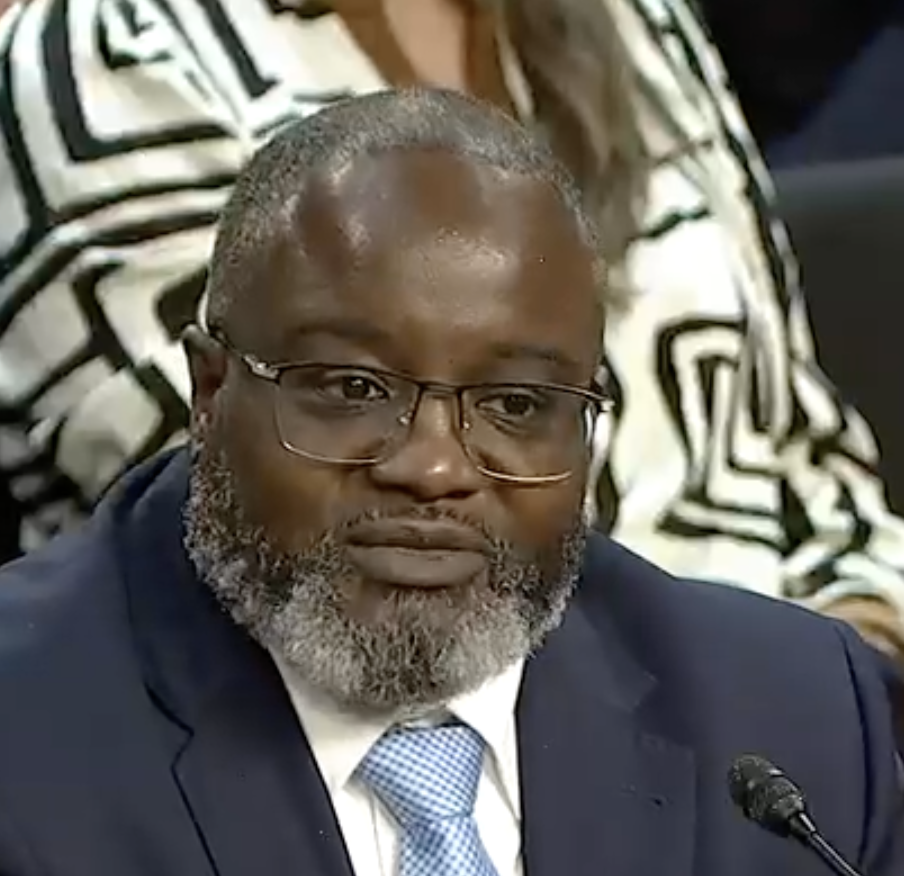

Judge of the United States District Court for the Middle District of Alabama
- Incumbent
- Assumed office November 6, 2025
- Appointed by: Donald Trump
- Preceded by: Andrew L. Brasher

Associate Justice of the Alabama Supreme Court
- In office May 20, 2025 – November 10, 2025
- Appointed by: Kay Ivey
- Preceded by: Jay Mitchell
- Succeeded by: Will Parker

Judge of the Alabama Court of Civil Appeals
- In office February 1, 2024 – May 20, 2025
- Appointed by: Kay Ivey
- Preceded by: William Thompson
- Succeeded by: Ben Bowden

Personal details
- Born: Billy Wayne Lewis Jr. 1978 (age 47–48) Darmstadt, West Germany (now Germany)
- Party: Republican
- Education: University of the South (BA); Samford University (JD)

Billy Wayne Lewis Jr. (known professionally as Bill Lewis) (born 1978) is an American lawyer who serves as a United States district judge of the United States District Court for the Middle District of Alabama since 2025. He briefly served as an associate justice on the Alabama Supreme Court in mid-2025.

== Early life and education ==
Lewis was born Billy Wayne Lewis II in 1978 in Darmstadt, West Germany. He was valedictorian of his high school class at Wetumpka High School in 1996. He earned a Bachelor of Arts degree in economics from the University of the South in 2000 and his Juris Doctor at Samford University Cumberland School of Law in 2003.

== Early career ==
Prior to taking the bench, Lewis was a law clerk for Judge John Bush of the Elmore County Circuit Court from 2003 to 2004. In early 2005, he became an assistant district attorney in the Elmore County District Attorney's office. Afterwards, he was senior partner of the Law Offices of Bill Lewis, a law firm in Wetumpka he started in 2006. He practiced civil law, personal injury law, and family law.

== Judicial career ==
=== State judicial service ===
Lewis served as a judge for the 19th Judicial Circuit Court from 2016 until he was appointed to the Alabama Court of Civil Appeals on February 29, 2024, by Governor Kay Ivey. Following the resignation of Jay Mitchell to run for state Attorney General, Lewis was appointed as associate justice on the Supreme Court of Alabama by Governor Ivey.

=== Federal judicial service ===
On August 12, 2025, the Trump administration announced its intention to nominate Lewis to be a judge on the United States District Court for the Middle District of Alabama. On September 3, 2025, he and other nominees testified before the U.S. Senate Judiciary Committee. On October 1, 2025, the Senate Judiciary Committee voted to send his nomination to the full U.S. Senate by a 14–8 vote. On October 22, 2025, the Senate invoked cloture on his nomination by a 60–39 vote. On October 27, 2025, his nomination was confirmed by a 58–40 vote. He received his judicial commission on November 6, 2025.

Lewis resides in Wetumpka, Alabama.

== Electoral history ==
2018 Alabama's 19th judicial circuit election, place 1
Party	Candidate	Votes	%
Republican	Bill Lewis	47,996	98.66
Write-in		653	1.34
Total votes		48,649	100.00

== See also ==
- List of African American jurists
- List of African American federal judges
- List of justices of the Supreme Court of Alabama

Legal offices
Preceded by Jay Mitchell	Associate Justice of the Alabama Supreme Court; 2025	Succeeded by Will Parker
Preceded by Andrew L. Brasher	Judge of the United States District Court for the Middle District of Alabama; 2025–present	Incumbent
