= Non-citizen suffrage in the United States =

Non-citizen suffrage in the United States has been greatly reduced over time and historically has been a contentious issue.

Before 1926, as many as 40 states allowed non-citizens to vote in elections, usually with a residency requirement ranging from a few months to a few years. While federal law does not prohibit noncitizens from voting in state or local elections, no state has allowed noncitizens to vote in statewide elections since Arkansas became the last state to outlaw noncitizen voting in state elections in 1926.

Since 1997, the Illegal Immigration Reform and Immigrant Responsibility Act of 1996 has prohibited non-citizens from voting in federal elections, with the threat of fines, imprisonment, inadmissibility and deportation. Exempt from punishment is any noncitizen who, at the time of voting, had two natural or adoptive U.S. citizen parents, who began permanently living in the United States before turning 16 years old, and who reasonably believed that they were a citizen of the United States.

As of December 2022, non-citizen voting is allowed for a handful of local elections, including in Winooski, Montpelier, and Burlington, Vermont in Vermont, and over a dozen cities in Maryland near Washington, D.C. (Note: As of May 2026, the 11 local governments allowing noncitizens to vote were: Barnesville, Cheverly, Chevy Chase Section 3, Garrett Park, Glen Echo, Hyattsville, Martin's Additions, Mount Rainier, Riverdale Park, Somerset, and Takoma Park.) In 2023, D.C. itself started allowing local non-citizen voting. Additionally, the U.S. territories of American Samoa and the Northern Mariana Islands allow non-citizen US nationals to vote, a status granted to all persons born in American Samoa. All persons born in the Northern Mariana Islands automatically become US citizens at birth, as opposed to becoming US nationals at birth. Guam and Hawaii, by contrast, do not allow non-citizen US nationals to vote. Turnout by non-citizens in many of these cities remains very low (sometimes less than 0.5% of voters), with some non-citizens expressing fear about the spotlight and backlash around how voting might hurt their application to become citizens.

== Discussion ==
In 2006, San Francisco State University political science professor and rights activist Ron Hayduk published a book entitled Democracy For All: Restoring Immigrant Voting Rights in the United States. The book presents additional elements of the historical and present reality of noncitizen voting rights in the United States.

U.S. Representative Jamie Raskin has argued that the blanket exclusion of noncitizens from the ballot is neither constitutionally required nor historically normal.

In 2017, journalist Joe Matthews called for universal suffrage in California.

== Pre-1926 ==
While initial research showed that 22 states or territories, including colonies before the Declaration of Independence, have at some time given at least some voting rights to non-citizens in some or all elections, more recent and in-depth studies uncovered evidence of 40 states providing suffrage for non-citizens at some point before 1926. For example, in 1875, the Supreme Court in Minor v. Happersett noted that "citizenship has not in all cases been made a condition precedent to the enjoyment of the right of suffrage. Thus, in Missouri, persons of foreign birth, who have declared their intention to become citizens of the United States, may under certain circumstances vote."

Anti-Irish Catholic sentiment and anti-German Catholic sentiment following the War of 1812 and intensifying again in the 1840s lead many states, particularly in the Northeast, to amend their constitutions to prohibit non-citizens from voting. States that banned non-citizen voting during this time included New Hampshire in 1814, Virginia in 1818, Connecticut in 1819, New Jersey in 1820, Massachusetts in 1822, Vermont in 1828, Pennsylvania in 1838, Delaware in 1831, Tennessee in 1834, Rhode Island in 1842, Illinois in 1848, Ohio and Maryland in 1851, and North Carolina in 1856. The Constitution of the Confederate States of America explicitly forbade noncitizen voting.

By 1900, nearly half of the states and territories had some experience with voting by non-citizens, and for some the experience lasted more than half a century. At the turn of the twentieth century, anti-immigration feeling ran high, and Alabama stopped allowing non-citizens to vote by way of a constitutional change in 1901; Colorado followed suit in 1902, Wisconsin in 1908, and Oregon in 1914. Just as the nationalism unleashed by the War of 1812 helped to reverse the non-citizen suffrage policies inherited from the late eighteenth century, World War I caused a sweeping retreat from the progressive non-citizen suffrage policies of the late nineteenth century. In 1918, Kansas, Nebraska, and South Dakota all changed their constitutions to purge non-citizen suffrage, and Texas ended the practice of noncitizen voting in primary elections by statute. Indiana and Texas joined the trend in 1921, followed by Mississippi in 1924 and, finally, Arkansas in 1926. In 1931, political scientist Leon Aylsworth noted that "[f]or the first time in over a hundred years, a national election was held in 1928 in which no alien in any state had the right to cast a vote for a candidate for any office – national, state, or local."

No citizenship requirement for suffrage
State	Years	Citation
Connecticut	1776–1819	
Delaware	1776–1831	
Illinois		* Article 27 of the 1818 Illinois Constitution: "In all elections, all white male inhabitants above the age of 21 years, having resided in the state six months next preceding the election, shall enjoy the right of an elector": 1848: end of non-citizen suffrage by constitutional amendment, but noncitizens who were present in 1848 were grandfathered.
Kentucky	1789–1799	
Maryland	1776-1851	
Massachusetts	1780-?	1780 Massachusetts Constitution: Article IV (Chapter I., Section III. House of Representatives) : "Every male person, being twenty-one years of age, and resident in any particular town in this Commonwealth for the space of one year next preceding, having a freehold estate within the same town, of the annual income of three pounds, or any estate of the value of sixty pounds, shall have a right to vote in the choice of a Representative or Representatives for the said town."; Article II (Chapter I, Section II. Senate): "every male inhabitant of twenty-one years of age and upwards, having a freehold estate within the Commonwealth, of the annual income of three pounds, or any estate of the value of sixty pounds, shall have a right to give in his vote for the Senators for the district of which he is an inhabitant. And to remove all doubts concerning the meaning of the word "inhabitant" in this constitution, every person shall be considered as an inhabitant, for the purpose of electing and being elected into any office, or place within this State, in that town, district, or plantation, where he dwelleth, or hath his home."
New Hampshire	1792–1814	
New Jersey	1776–1820	
New York	1776–1804	1777 New York State Constitution, Article VII: "[E]very male inhabitant of full age, who shall have personally resided within one of the counties of this State for six months immediately preceding the day of election, shall, at such election, be entitled to vote for representatives of the said county in assembly; if, during the time aforesaid, he shall have been a freeholder, possessing a freehold of the value of twenty pounds, within the said county, or have rented a tenement therein of the yearly value of forty shillings, and been rated and actually paid taxes to this State: Provided always, That every person who now is a freeman of the city of Albany, or who was made a freeman of the city of New York on or before the fourteenth day of October, in the year of our Lord one thousand seven hundred and seventy-five, and shall be actually and usually resident in the said cities, respectively, shall be entitled to vote for representatives in assembly within his said place of residence."
North Carolina	1704–1856	
Northwest Territory	1787-1803	1787 Northwest Ordinance (valid until 1803) "Provided, That no person be eligible or qualified to act as a representative unless he shall have been a citizen of one of the United States three years, and be a resident in the district, or unless he shall have resided in the district three years; and, in either case, shall likewise hold in his own right, in fee simple, two hundred acres of land within the same; Provided, also, That a freehold in 50 acres (200,000 m^{2}) of land in the district, having been a citizen of one of the states, and being resident in the district, or the like freehold and two years residence in the district, shall be necessary to qualify a man as an elector of a representative."
Ohio	1802-1851	1802 Constitution: "In all elections, all white male inhabitants above the age of twenty-one years, having resided in the State one year next preceding the election, and who have paid or are charged with a State or county tax, shall enjoy the right of an elector"; 1851: end of non-citizen voting rights
Pennsylvania	1776-1874	1776 Constitution: "all free men having a sufficient evident common interest with, and attachment to the community, have a right to elect officers, or to be elected into office"; 1790 Constitution (Art. III section 1.): "In elections by the citizens, every freeman of the age of twenty-one years, having resided in the State two years next before the election, and within that time paid a State or county tax, which shall have been assessed at least six months before the election, shall enjoy the rights of an elector: Provided, That the sons of persons qualified asaforesaid, between the ages of twenty-one and twenty-two years, shall be entitled to vote, although they shall not have paid taxes."; 1838 Constitution (Art. III, section 1.): "In elections by the citizens, every white freeman of the age of twenty-one years, having resided in this State one year, and in the election-district where he offers to vote ten days immediately preceding such election, and within two years paid a State or county tax, which shall have been assessed at least ten days before the election, shall enjoy the rights of an elector. ..."; 1874 Constitution (Article VIII, section 1.): "Every male citizen twenty-one years of age, possessing the following qualifications, shall be entitled to vote at all elections: First—He shall have been a citizen of the United States at least one month. ..."
Rhode Island	1762–1842	
South Carolina	1790–?	
Tennessee	1796–1834	
Vermont	1776-1828	1776 and 1786 Constitutions: "all freemen. having a sufficient, evident, common interest with, and attachment to the community, have a right to elect officers, or be elected into office."; 1793 Constitution (Section 21st): "Every man of the full age of twenty one years, having resided in this State for the space of one whole year next before the election of Representatives, and is of a quiet and peaceable behaviour, and will take the following oath or affirmation, shall be entitled to all the privileges of a freeman of this State. "You solemnly swear (or affirm) that whenever you give your vote or suffrage, touching any matter that concerns the State of Vermont, you will do it so as in your conscience you shall judge will most conduce to the best good of the same, as established by the constitution, without fear or favour of any man." "; 1828: end of non-citizen suffrage for federal elections; but still up to 1977 for local elections.
Virginia	1776-1850	1776 Virginia Bill of Rights: "all men, having sufficient evidence of permanent common interest with, and attachment to, the community, have the right of suffrage"; 1850: end of non-citizen voting rights

Suffrage for those who intend to become citizens
State	Years	Citation
Alabama	1868-	1868: "Every male person, born in the United States, and every male person who has been naturalized, or who has legally declared his intention to become a citizen of the United States, twenty-one years old or upward, who shall have resided in this State six months next preceding the election, and three months in the county in which he offers to vote, except as hereinafter provided, shall be deemed an elector"; 1901: "Every male citizen of this state who is a citizen of the United States, and every male resident of foreign birth, who, before the ratification of this Constitution, shall have legally declared his intention to become a citizen of the United States, twenty-one years old or upwards, not laboring under any of the disabilities named in this article, and possessing the qualifications required by it, shall be an elector, and shall be entitled to vote at any election by the people; provided, that all foreigners who have legally declared their intention to become citizens of the United States, shall, if they fail to become citizens thereof at the time they are entitled to become such, cease to have the right to vote until they become such citizens"
Arkansas	1874-1926	1874: "Every male citizen of the United States, or male person who has declared his intention of becoming a citizen of the same, of the age of twenty-one years, who has resided in the State twelve months, and in the county six months, and in the voting precinct or ward one month, next preceding any election, where he may propose to vote, shall be entitled to vote at all elections by the people."; 1926: end of non-citizen voting rights
Colorado	1876–1902	
Florida	1868-1894	1868: "Every male person of the age of twenty-one years and upwards, of whatever race, color, nationality, or previous condition, who shall, at the time of offering to vote, be a citizen of the United States, or who shall have declared his intention to become such in conformity to the laws of the United States, and who shall have resided and had his habitation, domicil, home, and place of permanent abode in Florida for one year, and in the county for six months, next preceding the election at which he shall offer to vote, shall in such county be deemed a qualified elector at all elections under this Constitution."; 1894: end of non-citizen voting rights
Georgia	1868-1877	1868 "Every male person born in the United States and every male person who has been naturalized, or who has legally declared his intention to become a citizen of the United States, twenty-one years old or upward, who shall have resided in this State six months next preceding the election, and shall have resided thirty days in the county in which he offers to vote, and shall have paid all taxes which may have been required of him, and which he may have had an opportunity of paying, agreeably to law, for the year next preceding the election (except as hereinafter provided), shall be deemed an elector"; 1877: end of non-citizen voting rights
Idaho	1863–1890	
Indiana	1851-1921	1851: "In all elections, not otherwise provided for by this Constitution, every white male citizen of the United States, of the age of twenty-one years and upwards, who shall have resided in the State during the six months immediately preceding such election; and every white male, of foreign birth, of the age of twenty-one years and upwards, who shall have resided in the United States one year, and shall have resided in the State during the six months immediately preceding such election, and shall have declared his intention to become a citizen of the United States, conformably to the laws of the United States on the subject of naturalization; shall be entitled to vote, in the township or precinct where he may reside."; "No Negro or Mulatto shall have the right of suffrage"; 1921: end of non-citizen voting rights
Kansas	1859-1918	1859: "Every white male person, of twenty-one years and upward, belonging to either of the following classes, who shall have resided in Kansas six months next preceding any election, and in the township or ward in which he offers to vote at least thirty days next preceding such election, shall be deemed a qualified elector: First, Citizens of the United States. Second, Persons of foreign birth who shall have declared their intention to become citizens, conformably to the laws of the United States on the subject of naturalization."; 1918: end of non-citizen voting rights
Louisiana	1879–?	
Michigan	1879–?	1850: "In all elections, every male inhabitant of this State, being a citizen of the United States, every male inhabitant residing in this State on the twenty-fourth day of June, eighteen hundred and thirty-five, every male inhabitant residing in this State on the first day of January, eighteen hundred and fifty, every male inhabitant of foreign birth who, having resided in the State two years and six months prior to the eighth day of November, eighteen hundred and ninety-four, and having declared his intention to become a citizen of the United States two years and six months prior to said last named day, and every civilized male inhabitant of Indian descent, a native of the United States and not a member of any tribe, shall be an elector and entitled to vote; but no one shall be an elector or entitled to vote at any election unless he shall be above the age of twenty-one years, and has resided in this State six month, and in the township or ward in which he offers to vote, twenty days next preceding such election"; 1894: end of non-citizen voting rights
Minnesota	1849/1857–1898	
Mississippi	uncertain, possibly before 1924	never; up to 1924
Missouri	1865–1921	
Montana	1864–1889	
Nebraska	1854–1918	
Nevada	1848–1864	
North Dakota	1889-1889/1909	
Oklahoma	1850–1907	
Oregon	1848–1914	
South Dakota	1850–1918	
Texas	1776-1921	1876: "Every male person subject to none of the foregoing disqualifications, who shall have attained the age of twenty-one years, and who shall be a citizen of the United States, and who shall have resided in this State one year next preceding an election, and the last six months within the district or county in which he offers to vote, shall be deemed a qualified elector; and every male person of foreign birth, subject to none of the foregoing disqualifications, who, at any time before an election, shall have declared his intention to become a citizen of the United States, in accordance with the federal naturalization laws, and shall have resided in this State one year next preceding such election, and the last six months in the county in which he offers to vote, shall also be deemed a qualified elector"; 1921
Washington	1853–1889	
Wisconsin	1848-1908	1848: "Every male person of the age of twenty-one years, or upwards, of the following classes, who shall have resided in this State for one year next preceding any election, shall be deemed a qualified elector at such election. 1st. White citizens of the United States 2d. White persons of foreign birth who shall have declared their intention to become citizens conformably to the laws of the United States on the subject of naturalization ..."; "No person shall be eligible to the legislature, who shall not have resided one year within the state, and be a qualified elector in the district he may be chosen to represent."; 1908
Wyoming	1850–1889	

== American Samoa & the Northern Mariana Islands ==
Unlike the United States's other self-governing territories, American Samoa, an unincorporated, unorganized territory of the United States since 1900, has not been given jus soli birthright citizenship either by incorporation or act of Congress for those born in its borders. As a result, people born in American Samoa or any United States Minor Outlying Islands are not given automatic US citizenship but have instead been given US nationality without citizenship.

Residents of the Northern Mariana Islands gained automatic US citizenship via the Covenant with the United States in November 1986, but also have the option (prior to reaching the age of 18) to reject US citizenship and accept non-citizen US nationality instead.

Under American Samoa law and Northern Mariana Islands law, both US citizens and non-citizen nationals may register to vote, making them the only jurisdictions at the state or territorial level that allow non-citizens to vote and making their delegates the only members of Congress voted for by non-citizens (though those members cannot themselves vote in Congress, because territories are not represented there in the Constitution).

== 21st century ==
Turnout by non-citizens has been very low (sometimes less than 0.5% of voters) in cities where non-citizen voting is legal only for some local elections, with some non-citizens expressing fear that about the spotlight and backlash and fear around how voting might hurt their application to become citizens.

=== District of Columbia (Local elections) ===
Non-citizen voting for anyone residing in the District at least 30 days was enacted on February 23, 2023. Non-citizen residents of DC may vote in local matters (such as mayor or referendums) but they may not vote in federal elections (such as US president or DC's house delegate). As of April 30, 2024, out of 450,070 registered voters, 372 were noncitizens.

=== Maryland (Local elections) ===
Municipalities in Maryland that allow non-citizen suffrage.

Maryland ended noncitizen voting rights for state and federal elections in 1851, but its constitution recognizes the autonomy of local municipalities and localities on the subject. Localities with non-citizen voting in local elections include:

- Barnesville (since 1918)
- Brentwood
- Cheverly
- Chevy Chase Section Three
- Colmar Manor
- Edmonston (since 2024)
- Frederick
- Garrett Park (since 1999)
- Glen Echo
- Greenbelt (since 2024)
- Hyattsville (since December 2016)
- Martin's Additions
- Mount Rainier (since January 2017)
- Riverdale (since May 2018)
- Somerset (since 1976)
- Takoma Park (since 1993)

=== California (School Board elections only) ===
In November 2016 voters in San Francisco approved a proposal to allow just the parents of children in the San Francisco school system to vote in school board elections regardless of their immigration or citizenship status. 65 non-citizen parents registered for the 2018 election, 36 parents registered for 2020, and 74 parents registered for the 2022 election. Voters rejected similar proposals in 2004 and 2010. It only applies to school board elections.

On July 29, 2022, ordinance 206–21, which allowed noncitizens to vote in San Francisco school board elections, was struck down before being upheld in August 2023 along with a similar measure in Oakland. Despite the successful 2022 ballot measure allowing non-citizen parents to vote for members of the Oakland Unified School District Board of Education, it has not yet been implemented.

=== Vermont (Municipal elections) ===
Municipalities with non-citizen suffrage in Vermont (Burlington not highlighted)

Montpelier citizens passed a charter change on November 6, 2018, that would afford full voting rights in municipal elections to any legal non-citizens residing in the city. A similar proposal in Winooski passed in 2020. Approval for all localities was granted by the Vermont state legislature in June 2021, overriding the veto of Governor Phil Scott. Burlington, the largest city in the state, joined the list of municipalities allowing non-citizens to vote in March 2023.

== Proposed efforts that have been overturned or preempted ==
=== Massachusetts ===
Cambridge approved the right of non-citizens to vote in local elections in 2000, but still needs the state to sign-off on the measure.

=== Ohio ===
The city of Yellow Springs passed a law by referendum in 2019, allowing non-citizens to vote in local elections. This was disallowed by Ohio Secretary of State Frank LaRose on the grounds that it was unconstitutional. The Ohio constitution was amended in 2022 to specifically exclude non-citizens from voting.

=== New York ===
In New York City, noncitizens who have children in public schools could vote in school board elections until 2002 when officials abolished school boards. In 2021, New York City passed a law allowing legal immigrants the right to vote in city and borough elections. This law was struck down in June 2022 as violating the New York State constitution, preventing it from going into effect. An appeals court upheld that decision in February 2024, though the city planned to appeal further. Previously, bills had been submitted at the New York City Council and at the New York State Assembly in 2003, 2005, 2006 and 2010. In March 2025, the New York supreme court rules that noncitizen could not vote in municipal elections.

== State constitutions that prevent non-citizen voting in local elections ==
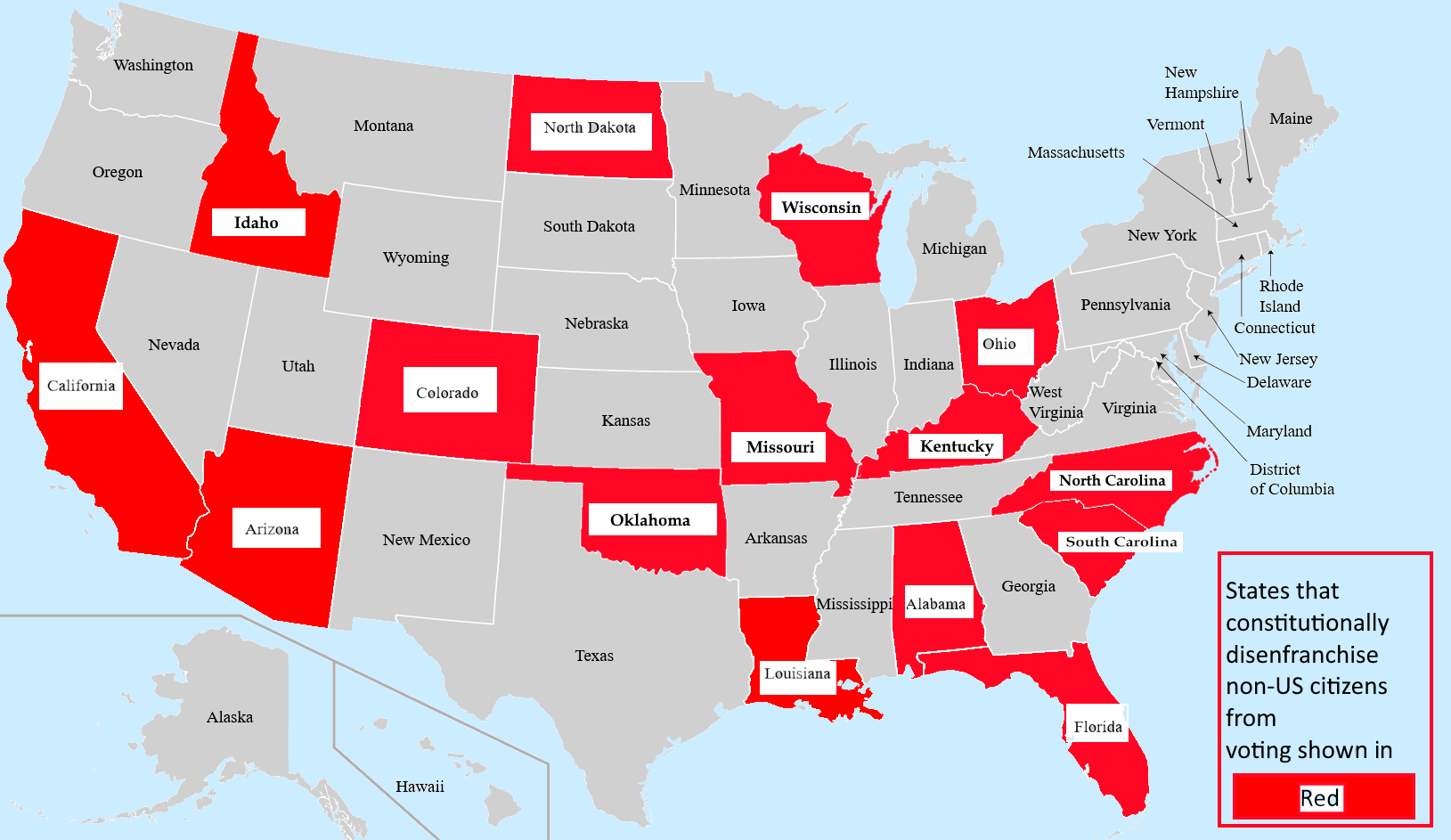
Map of US states where in their constitutions they specify that only U.S. citizens can vote as of 2025

=== Only citizens clause ===
As of November 5th, 2025, seventeen state constitutions explicitly require citizenship for voting:

- Alabama, approved by referendum in 2020
- Arizona
- Colorado, approved by referendum in 2020
- Florida, approved by referendum in 2020
- Louisiana, approved by referendum in 2022
- North Dakota, approved by referendum in 2018
- Ohio, approved by referendum in 2022
- Iowa, approved by referendum in 2024
- Idaho, approved by referendum in 2024
- Wisconsin, approved by referendum in 2024
- Kentucky, approved by referendum in 2024
- Oklahoma, approved by referendum in 2024
- North Carolina, approved by referendum in 2024
- South Carolina, approved by referendum in 2024
- Missouri, approved by referendum in 2024
- Wyoming
- Texas approved by referendum in 2025

== See also ==
- Electoral fraud in the United States § Noncitizen voting
- Non-resident citizen voting
- United States non-resident eligible voters
