= Homewood, Alabama =

City in Alabama, United States

- City
- Location of Homewood in Jefferson County, Alabama
- Coordinates: 33°27′43″N 86°48′32″W
- Country: United States
- State: Alabama
- County: Jefferson
- Incorporated: December 29, 1926

Government
  - Type: Council-manager government

Area
  - Total: 8.31 sq mi (21.53 km^{2})
  - Land: 8.26 sq mi (21.40 km^{2})
  - Water: 0.050 sq mi (0.13 km^{2})
- Elevation: 705 ft (215 m)

Population (2020)
  - Total: 26,414
  - Estimate (2022): 27,864
  - Density: 3,370/sq mi (1,302/km^{2})
- Time zone: UTC−6 (Central (CST))
  - Summer (DST): UTC−5 (CDT)
- ZIP Codes: 35209, 35219, 35259
- Area codes: 205 and 659
- FIPS code: 01-35800
- GNIS feature ID: 2404724
- Website: cityofhomewood.com

Homewood is a city located in southeastern Jefferson County, Alabama, United States. It is part of the Birmingham metropolitan area, it is located to the side of Red Mountain from Birmingham, due south of the city center. The population was estimated at 26,414 in the 2020 census.

== History ==
In 1955, Oak Grove was also annexed into Homewood.

Homewood avoided the worst of the turmoil associated with the Civil Rights Movement and, more specifically, the Southern Christian Leadership Conference's 1963 Birmingham campaign. However, in September 1963, a racially motivated bombing in the Rosedale District.

=== Hollywood ===
Hollywood is a former town annexed into Homewood, Alabama, in 1929.

Clyde Nelson began developing Hollywood Boulevard as a residential subdivision in 1926. He employed a sales force of 75, armed with the memorable slogan "Out of the Smoke Zone, Into the Ozone", to entice Birmingham residents over Red Mountain. Architect George P. Turner designed many of the new homes in the Spanish Colonial Revival architecture, which had become fashionably linked with the glamour of Hollywood, California in the early days of the motion picture industry there. Turner also nodded to the English Tudor style which was already widespread in Birmingham and over the mountain.

The Hollywood Country Club on Lakeshore Drive (destroyed in 1984 by fire) and the American Legion Post 134 (originally Hollywood's Town Hall) were also built at this time.

In order to support his new development, Nelson invented the area's first autobus line and extended the first natural gas pipeline into Shades Valley.

Hollywood incorporated as a town on January 14, 1927, with Clarence Lloyd as its first and only mayor. The town was annexed into Homewood on October 14, 1929. The Great Depression virtually ended development of the subdivision.

In 2002, the Hollywood Historic District was registered with the National Register of Historic Places, and is home to The American Institute of Architects (AIA)-nominated houses like 11 Bonita Drive. The listing includes 412 contributing buildings and one contributing site, over a 815 acres (330 ha) area.

== Government ==
In September 2024, voters approved moving from a mayor-council form of government to a council–manager government. A mayor, who is directly elected by all voters, serves as the president of a council that includes four other members, one elected from each of four geographic wards. The change took effect in November 2025.

== Geography ==
According to the United States Census Bureau, the city has a total area of 8.31 square miles (21.5 km^{2}), all land.

The city, along with the rest of Jefferson County, lies atop iron, coal, and limestone deposits.

Shades Creek, part of the Cahaba River system, runs through Homewood.

== Demographics ==
Historical population
| Census | Pop. | Note | %± |
|---|---|---|---|
| 1930 | 6,103 | | — |
| 1940 | 7,397 | | 21.2% |
| 1950 | 12,866 | | 73.9% |
| 1960 | 20,289 | | 57.7% |
| 1970 | 21,137 | | 4.2% |
| 1980 | 21,412 | | 1.3% |
| 1990 | 22,922 | | 7.1% |
| 2000 | 25,043 | | 9.3% |
| 2010 | 25,167 | | 0.5% |
| 2020 | 26,414 | | 5.0% |
| 2025 (est.) | 28,118 | ▲ | 6.5% |
U.S. Decennial Census; 2020 Census

=== Racial and ethnic composition ===
Homewood city, Alabama – Racial and ethnic composition Note: the US Census treats Hispanic/Latino as an ethnic category. This table excludes Latinos from the racial categories and assigns them to a separate category. Hispanics/Latinos may be of any race.
| Race / Ethnicity (NH = Non-Hispanic) | Pop 2000 | Pop 2010 | Pop 2020 | % 2000 | % 2010 | % 2020 |
|---|---|---|---|---|---|---|
| White alone (NH) | 19,566 | 18,118 | 18,178 | 78.13% | 71.99% | 68.82% |
| Black or African American alone (NH) | 3,814 | 4,306 | 5,223 | 15.23% | 17.11% | 19.77% |
| Native American or Alaska Native alone (NH) | 40 | 41 | 29 | 0.16% | 0.16% | 0.11% |
| Asian alone (NH) | 639 | 548 | 715 | 2.55% | 2.18% | 2.71% |
| Native Hawaiian or Pacific Islander alone (NH) | 7 | 7 | 8 | 0.03% | 0.03% | 0.03% |
| Other race alone (NH) | 24 | 30 | 69 | 0.10% | 0.12% | 0.26% |
| Mixed race or Multiracial (NH) | 251 | 271 | 763 | 1.00% | 1.08% | 2.89% |
| Hispanic or Latino (any race) | 702 | 1,846 | 1,429 | 2.80% | 7.34% | 5.41% |
| Total | 25,043 | 25,167 | 26,414 | 100.00% | 100.00% | 100.00% |

=== 2020 census ===
As of the 2020 census, there were 26,414 people, 9,770 households, and 5,966 families residing in the city. The population density was 3,191.6 inhabitants per square mile (1,232.3/km^{2}).

The median age was 31.3 years. 23.4% of residents were under the age of 18 and 11.8% of residents were 65 years of age or older. For every 100 females there were 82.6 males, and for every 100 females age 18 and over there were 77.7 males age 18 and over.

100.0% of residents lived in urban areas, while 0.0% lived in rural areas.

Of the 9,770 households, 34.3% had children under the age of 18 living in them. Of all households, 46.6% were married-couple households, 17.5% were households with a male householder and no spouse or partner present, and 32.2% were households with a female householder and no spouse or partner present. About 31.6% of all households were made up of individuals and 9.8% had someone living alone who was 65 years of age or older.

There were 10,942 housing units, of which 10.7% were vacant. The homeowner vacancy rate was 2.2% and the rental vacancy rate was 16.1%.

Racial composition as of the 2020 census
| Race | Number | Percent |
|---|---|---|
| White | 18,453 | 69.9% |
| Black or African American | 5,245 | 19.9% |
| American Indian and Alaska Native | 55 | 0.2% |
| Asian | 716 | 2.7% |
| Native Hawaiian and Other Pacific Islander | 9 | 0.0% |
| Some other race | 524 | 2.0% |
| Two or more races | 1,412 | 5.3% |
| Hispanic or Latino (of any race) | 1,429 | 5.4% |

=== 2010 census ===
As of the 2010 census, there were 25,167 people, 10,092 households, and 5,760 families living in the city. The population density was 3,032.2 inhabitants per square mile (1,170.7/km^{2}). There were 11,385 housing units at an average density of 1,371.7 per square mile (529.6/km^{2}). The racial makeup of the city was 69.696% White, 17.3% Black or African-American, 0.2% Native American, 2.2% Asian, 0.0% Pacific Islander, 4.4% from other races, and 1.4% from two or more races. 7.3% of the population were Hispanic or Latino of any race.

Of the 10,092 households 30.1% had children under the age of 18 living with them, 41.3% were married couples living together, 12.2% had a female householder with no husband present, and 42.9% were non-families. 34.4% of households were one person and 9.9% were one person aged 65 or older. The average household size was 2.31 and the average family size was 3.02.

The age distribution was 22.8% under the age of 18, 17.4% from 18 to 24, 30.8% from 25 to 44, 19.9% from 45 to 64, and 9.1% 65 or older. The median age was 29.8 years. For every 100 females, there were 88.2 males. For every 100 females age 18 and over, there were 86.3 males.

The median family income was $78,252. Males had a median income of $50,163 versus $41,023 for females. The per capita income for the city was $30,601. About 5.1% of families and 10.1% of the population were below the poverty line, including 6.9% of those under age 18 and 5.6% of those age 65 or over.

=== 2000 census ===
As of the 2000 census, there were 25,043 people, 10,688 households, and 5,878 families living in the city. The population density was 3,014.7 inhabitants per square mile (1,164.0/km^{2}). There were 11,494 housing units at an average density of 1,383.6 per square mile (534.2/km^{2}). The racial makeup of the city was 79.75% White, 15.30% Black or African-American, 0.20% Native American, 2.57% Asian, 0.03% Pacific Islander, 1.00% from other races, and 1.16% from two or more races. 2.80% of the population were Hispanic or Latino of any race.

Of the 10,688 households 27.2% had children under the age of 18 living with them, 41.0% were married couples living together, 11.4% had a female householder with no husband present, and 45.0% were non-families. 36.2% of households were one person and 9.4% were one person aged 65 or older. The average household size was 2.16 and the average family size was 2.87.

The age distribution was 20.3% under the age of 18, 17.8% from 18 to 24, 34.0% from 25 to 44, 17.3% from 45 to 64, and 10.6% 65 or older. The median age was 30 years. For every 100 females, there were 86.0 males. For every 100 females age 18 and over, there were 81.9 males.

The median household income was $55,431 and the median family income was $70,256. Males had a median income of $40,969 versus $34,694 for females. The per capita income for the city was $25,491. About 4.4% of families and 7.6% of the population were below the poverty line, including 4.5% of those under age 18 and 4.3% of those age 65 or over.

== Schools ==
=== Public schools ===
The Homewood City School District is made up of five schools, including three elementary schools, one middle school and one high school:

- Shades Cahaba Elementary School
- Edgewood Elementary School
- Hall-Kent Elementary School
- Homewood Middle School
- Homewood High School

=== Colleges and universities ===
- Samford University

== Transportation ==
Transit service in Homewood is provided by Birmingham-Jefferson County Transit Authority, which operates Max Transit bus service.

== Notable people ==
- Ameer Abdullah, American football running back
- Mary Anderson (1918–2014), actress
- Paul DeMarco, lawyer and former Alabama State Representative
- Jack Edwards, former U.S. Congressman from the 1st District of Alabama
- Aaron Ernest, sprinter
- Katy Freels, professional soccer midfielder
- Charles Ghigna, children's author
- Evan Mathis, former American football offensive lineman
- Ronald Nored, National Basketball Association assistant coach
- Eric Ramsey, former American football player
- Samantha Shaw, former State Auditor of Alabama
- Luther Strange, U.S. Senator
- William C. Thompson, Presiding Judge, Alabama Court of Civil Appeals

== See also ==
- Birmingham, Alabama
