= John Crawley (disambiguation) =

John Crawley (born 1971) is a retired English cricketer.

John Crawley may also refer to:

- John Crawley (soccer) (born 1972), Australian former soccer player
- John A. Crawley (1834–1881), London-based English architect
- John Sayer Crawley (1867–1948), English actor
- John Crawley (judge) (1940–2013), American jurist and lawyer
- John Crawley (Irish republican), a member of the Provisional IRA
