= Judge Pitman =

Judge Pitman or Pittman may refer to:

- C.M. Pitman (1872–1948), British Judge Advocate of the Fleet and Referee of the Supreme Court of Judicature
- Craig Sorrell Pittman (born 1956), judge of the Alabama Court of Civil Appeals
- Elizabeth Pittman (1921–1998), municipal court judge in Omaha, Nebraska, and the first woman judge and the first black judge in Nebraska
- John Pitman (judge) (1785–1864), judge of the United States District Court for the District of Rhode Island
- Jonathan Pittman (born 1963), associate judge of the Superior Court of the District of Columbia
- Mark T. Pittman (born 1975), judge of the United States District Court for the Northern District of Texas
- Robert Carter Pitman (1825–1891), judge of the Massachusetts Superior Court
- Robert L. Pitman (born 1962), judge of the United States District Court for the Western District of Texas
- Thomas Virgil Pittman (1916–2012), judge of the United States District Courts for the Middle District and Southern Districts of Alabama

== See also ==
- Edwin L. Pittman (born 1935), justice of the Supreme Court of Mississippi
