= Kenneth Paschal =

American politician (born 1966)

Member of the Alabama House of Representatives from the 73rd district
- Incumbent
- Assumed office July 14, 2021
- Preceded by: Matt Fridy

Personal details
- Born: Kenneth Lavoyd Paschal; December 9, 1966 (age 59)
- Party: Republican

Military service
- Allegiance: United States
- Branch/service: United States Army
- Years of service: 1985–2006
- Rank: First Sergeant

Kenneth Paschal (born December 9, 1966) is an American politician from the state of Alabama. A member of the Republican Party, Paschal was elected to represent District 73 in the Alabama House of Representatives in a July 2021 special election. He is the first black Republican elected to the Alabama Legislature in almost 140 years, and the first to serve in the state legislature since W. P. Williams of Madison County served a two-year term from 1882 to 1884.

== Career ==
Paschal served 21 years in the United States Army, retiring in 2006 as a first sergeant.

Paschal worked with the Alabama Family Rights Association. He also served on the Shelby County Republican Executive Committee and was a commander of the American Legion.

Paschal ran for state representative following Matt Fridy's resignation in order to join the Alabama Court of Civil Appeals. Among his other positions, Paschal campaigned against critical race theory. He won the special election on July 13, 2021, becoming the first black Republican elected to the Alabama Legislature since the Reconstruction era. Paschal was sworn in the following day.

== Personal life ==
Paschal lives in Pelham, Alabama. He is a member of the First Baptist Church of Pelham.
