= 2022 Alabama lieutenant gubernatorial election =

- November 8, 2022
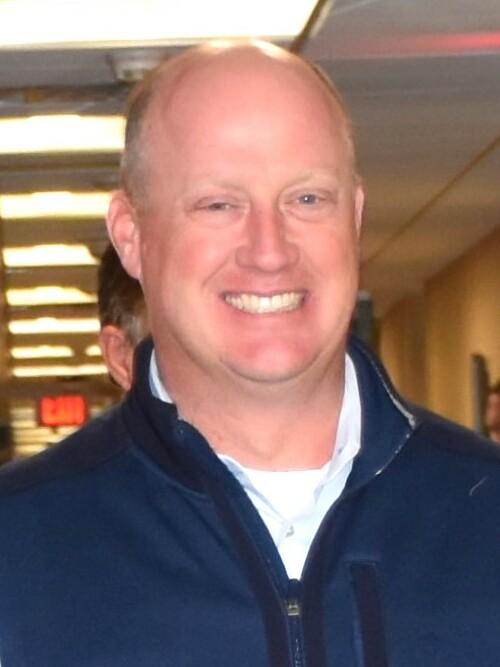

Nominee	Will Ainsworth	Ruth Page-Nelson
Party	Republican	Libertarian
Popular vote	957,534	178,660
Percentage	83.68%	15.61%
- Ainsworth: 40–50% 50–60% 60–70% 70–80% 80–90% >90% Page-Nelson: 40–50% 50–60% 60–70% 70–80% 80–90% >90% Tie: 50% No votes
Lieutenant Governor before election
Will Ainsworth
Republican
Elected Lieutenant Governor
Will Ainsworth
Republican

The 2022 Alabama lieutenant gubernatorial election was held on November 8, 2022, to elect the lieutenant governor of the state of Alabama. The election coincided with various other federal and state elections, including for Governor of Alabama. Primary elections were held on May 24, with runoffs scheduled for June 21 if a candidate failed to receive a majority of the vote.

Incumbent Republican lieutenant governor Will Ainsworth won re-election to a second term against Libertarian Ruth Page-Nelson. He was first elected in 2018 to succeed Kay Ivey, who ascended to the governorship and left the office vacant in 2017. No Democratic candidates filed to run.

== Republican primary ==
=== Candidates ===
==== Nominee ====
- Will Ainsworth, incumbent lieutenant governor

=== Endorsements ===
Will Ainsworth

State governors

- Kay Ivey, Governor of Alabama (2017–present), former Lieutenant Governor of Alabama (2011–2017), and former Alabama State Treasurer (2003–2011)

State legislators

- Clay Scofield, state senator from the 9th district (2010–present) and Senate Majority Leader (2021–present)

Organizations

- Alabama Association of Realtors
- Coastal 150

== Libertarian convention ==
=== Candidates ===
==== Nominee ====
- Ruth Page-Nelson, community activist and Republican candidate for U.S. Senate in 2020

== General election ==
=== Post-primary endorsements ===
Ruth Page-Nelson

Organizations

- Alabama Cannabis Coalition
- LetBamaVote.org

=== Results ===
2022 Alabama lieutenant gubernatorial election
Party	Candidate	Votes	%	±%
Republican	Will Ainsworth (incumbent)	957,534	83.68%	+22.43%
Libertarian	Ruth Page-Nelson	178,660	15.61%	N/A
Write-in		8,103	0.71%	
Total votes		1,144,297		
Republican hold				

== See also ==
- 2022 Alabama elections
- 2022 Alabama gubernatorial election
