= Jeffrey McLaughlin =

Jeffrey McLaughlin may refer to:

- Jeffrey McLaughlin (politician), Alabama politician
- Jeffrey McLaughlin (rower) (born 1965), American rower
