= 2024 Alabama appellate court elections =

- November 5, 2024

Elections were held in the U.S. state of Alabama to elect judges to both of the state appellate courts on November 5, 2024. Primary elections were held on March 5, 2024.

== Civil Appeals place 1 ==
=== Republican primary ===
==== Candidates ====
- Christy Edwards, incumbent.

=== General election ===
==== Endorsements ====
Christy Edwards (R)

Organizations

- Alabama Forestry Association

==== Results ====
2024 Alabama Court of Civil Appeals, Place 1 election
Party	Candidate	Votes	%
Republican	Christy Edwards (incumbent)	1,555,361	97.88%
Write-in		33,716	2.12%
Total votes		1,589,077	100%

== Civil Appeals place 2 ==
=== Republican primary ===
==== Candidates ====
===== Nominee =====
- Chad Hanson, incumbent.

===== Eliminated in primary =====
- Stephen Davis Parker, criminal prosecutor.

==== Endorsements ====
Chad Hanson (R)

Organizations

- Alabama Forestry Association

==== Primary results ====
Primary results by county Hanson: 70–80%; 60–70%; 50–60%; Parker: 60–70%; 50–60%

Republican primary results
Party	Candidate	Votes	%
Republican	Chad Hanson (incumbent)	264,908	56.48%
Republican	Stephen Davis Parker	204,100	43.52%
Total votes		469,008	100%

=== General election ===
==== Results ====
2024 Alabama Court of Civil Appeals, Place 2 election
Party	Candidate	Votes	%
Republican	Chad Hanson (incumbent)	1,549,864	97.87%
Write-in		33,644	2.13%
Total votes		1,583,508	100%

== Civil Appeals place 3 ==
=== Republican primary ===
==== Candidates ====
- Terry A. Moore, incumbent.

=== General election ===
==== Results ====
2024 Alabama Court of Civil Appeals, Place 3 election
Party	Candidate	Votes	%
Republican	Terry A. Moore (incumbent)	1,551,657	97.91%
Write-in		33,096	2.09%
Total votes		1,584,753	100%

== Criminal Appeals place 1 ==
=== Republican primary ===
==== Candidates ====
- Richard Minor, incumbent.

=== General election ===
==== Endorsements ====
Richard Minor (R)

Organizations

- Alabama Forestry Association

==== Results ====
2024 Alabama Court of Criminal Appeals, Place 1 election
Party	Candidate	Votes	%
Republican	Richard Minor (incumbent)	1,547,401	97.90%
Write-in		33,207	2.10%
Total votes		1,580,608	100%

== Criminal Appeals place 2 ==
Incumbent judge Chris McCool decided not to seek re-election and instead ran for associate justice on the Alabama Supreme Court.

=== Republican primary ===
==== Candidates ====
===== Nominee =====
- Rich Anderson, attorney.

===== Eliminated in primary =====
- Thomas Govan, prosecutor.

==== Primary results ====
Primary results by county Anderson: 70–80%; 60–70%; 50–60%; Govan: 50–60%

Republican primary results
Party	Candidate	Votes	%
Republican	Rich Anderson	260,934	55.35%
Republican	Thomas Govan	210,515	44.65%
Total votes		471,448	100%

=== General election ===
==== Endorsements ====
Rich Anderson (R)

Organizations

- ProgressPAC

==== Results ====
2024 Alabama Court of Criminal Appeals, Place 2 election
Party	Candidate	Votes	%
Republican	Rich Anderson	1,546,549	97.91%
Write-in		32,940	2.09%
Total votes		1,579,489	100%
Republican hold			

== Criminal Appeals place 3 ==
=== Republican primary ===
==== Candidates ====
- Bill Cole, incumbent.

=== General election ===
==== Endorsements ====
Bill Cole (R)

Organizations

- Alabama Forestry Association

==== Results ====
2024 Alabama Court of Criminal Appeals, Place 3 election
Party	Candidate	Votes	%
Republican	Bill Cole (incumbent)	1,547,520	97.93%
Write-in		32,746	2.07%
Total votes		1,580,266	100.00%
