= 2022 Alabama elections =

The 2022 Alabama elections were held on Tuesday, November 8, 2022. The primary elections were held on May 24, 2022, with runoffs taking place on June 21, 2022.

The state elected its class III U.S. senator, 4 of 9 members of the Alabama State Board of Education, all of its seats in the House of Representatives, 2 of 9 seats on the Supreme Court of Alabama, 4 of 10 seats on the Alabama Appellate Court and all seats of the Alabama House of Representatives and the Alabama Senate. It also voted on five ballot measures, including the adoption of a new state constitution, replacing the Alabama Constitution of 1901.

== Federal offices ==
=== United States class III Senate seat ===
Republican incumbent Richard Shelby retired. Republican Katie Britt won the open seat against Democrat Will Boyd.

=== United States House of Representatives ===
Alabama has seven seats in the House of Representatives. Six are held by Republicans, and one is held by a Democrat. Five of the Republicans and the one Democrat won reelection. One Republican, Mo Brooks from the 5th Congressional District, retired, and was succeeded by Republican Dale Strong.

== State ==
=== Executive ===
==== Governor ====
Incumbent Republican governor Kay Ivey won re-election against Democrat Yolanda Flowers.

==== Lieutenant governor ====
Incumbent Republican lieutenant governor Will Ainsworth won re-election against Libertarian Ruth Page Nelson.

==== Attorney general ====
Incumbent Republican attorney general Steve Marshall won re-election against Democrat Wendell Major.

==== Commissioner of Agriculture and Industries ====
Incumbent Republican Agriculture Commissioner Rick Pate won re-election against Libertarian Jason Clark.

==== State auditor ====
Republican Andrew Sorrell won election against Libertarian Leigh LaChine.

==== Secretary of state ====
Republican Wes Allen won election against Democrat Pamela Laffitte.

==== State treasurer ====
Republican Young Boozer won election against Libertarian Scott Hammond.

==== Public Service Commission ====
Two associate commissioner seats in the Alabama Public Service Commission were up for election. Republican incumbents Jeremy Oden and Chris Beeker Jr. were both re-elected.

=== Legislature ===
Every member of the Alabama state legislature was up for election in 2018. Both state senators and state representatives serve four-year terms in Alabama. After the 2018 elections, Republicans maintained control of both chambers. In 2018, all 35 Alabama Senate seats and all 105 Alabama House of Representatives seats were up for election. These seats will not be contested in a regularly scheduled election again until 2026.

==== House of Representatives ====
Republicans won 77 seats while Democrats won 28 seats. The Republican Party gained 5 seats.

==== Senate ====
Republicans won 27 while Democrats won 8 seats. The Republican Party gained 1 seat, the 29th, which was held by an retiring independent who caucused with the Republicans.

=== Judiciary ===
The state Supreme Court has 9 seats, all of which are currently occupied by Republican incumbents. At the appellate level, both the Alabama Court of Civil Appeals and the Alabama Court of Criminal Appeals have 5 seats each, all of which are currently held by Republicans.

==== Supreme Court ====
Two justices to the Alabama Supreme Court were elected, and both seats were won by Republicans.

== Ballot measures ==
A total of twelve statewide ballot measures appeared on the ballot, one in May and eleven in November.

2022 Alabama ballot measures
Name	Description	Votes				Type
Name	Description	Yes	%	No	%	Type
Amendment 1 (May)	Issues $85 million in bonds for historical sites and state parks.	605,329	76.97	181,138	23.03	Legislatively referred constitutional amendment
Amendment 1 (November)	Allows the legislature to provide for offenses for which bail can be denied.	1,020,464	80.48	247,554	19.52	Legislatively referred constitutional amendment
Amendment 2	Authorizes the state or local government to grant federal funds to public or private entities to expand or provide for broadband internet infrastructure.	939,704	78.55	256,541	21.45	Legislatively referred constitutional amendment
Amendment 3	Requires the governor to provide notice before granting a commutation or reprieve of a death sentence.	994,276	81.89	219,903	18.11	Legislatively referred constitutional amendment
Amendment 4	Requires changes to laws governing the conduct of a general election to be implemented at least six months before the general election.	937,729	79.96	235,090	20.04	Legislatively referred constitutional amendment
Amendment 5	Removes orphans' businesses from the jurisdiction of county probate courts.	780,480	68.71	355,467	31.29	Legislatively referred constitutional amendment
Amendment 6	Authorizes specified cities to use established property taxes to fund capital improvements.	676,579	60.70	437,997	39.30	Legislatively referred constitutional amendment
Amendment 7	Changes the requirements for local governments to finance economic and industrial development.	834,734	75.41	272,159	24.59	Legislatively referred constitutional amendment
Amendment 8	Provides that the Public Service Commission shall regulate certain private sewer systems in Shelby County.	686,822	71.56	272,999	28.44	Legislatively referred constitutional amendment
Amendment 9	Provides that the Public Service Commission shall regulate certain private sewer systems in Lake View from 2023 through 2027.	683,160	71.44	273,102	28.56	Legislatively referred constitutional amendment
Amendment 10	Authorizes the Code Commissioner to incorporate voter-approved amendments into the Alabama Constitution of 2022.	816,634	74.54	278,984	25.46	Legislatively referred constitutional amendment
Alabama Question	Amends certain sections of the Constitution of Alabama.	888,456	76.49	273,040	23.51	Legislatively referred constitutional amendment
Source: Alabama Secretary of State

Results by county

Amendment 1 (May) results by county
Yes:
- 60–70%
- 70–80%
- 80–90%

Amendment 1 (November) results by county
Yes:
- 50–60%
- 60–70%
- 70–80%
- 80–90%
- >90%

Amendment 2 results by county
Yes:
- 60–70%
- 70–80%
- 80–90%

Amendment 3 results by county
Yes:
- 50–60%
- 60–70%
- 70–80%
- 80–90%

Amendment 4 results by county
Yes:
- 50–60%
- 60–70%
- 70–80%
- 80–90%

Amendment 5 results by county
Yes:
- 50–60%
- 60–70%
- 70–80%
- 80–90%

Amendment 6 results by county
Yes:
- 50–60%
- 60–70%
- 70–80%
- 80–90%
No:
- 50–60%

Amendment 7 results by county
Yes:
- 50–60%
- 60–70%
- 70–80%
- 80–90%

Amendment 8 results by county
Yes:
- 50–60%
- 60–70%
- 70–80%
- 80–90%

Amendment 9 results by county
Yes:
- 50–60%
- 60–70%
- 70–80%
- 80–90%

Amendment 10 results by county
Yes:
- 50–60%
- 60–70%
- 70–80%
- 80–90%

Ratification Question results by county
Yes:
- 50–60%
- 60–70%
- 70–80%
- 80–90%

Results by precinct

Amendment 1 (May) results by precinct
Yes:
- 50–60%
- 60–70%
- 70–80%
- 80–90%
- 90–100%
No:
- 50–60%
- 60–70%
- 70–80%
- 80–90%
- 90–100%

Amendment 1 (November) results by precinct
Yes:
- 50–60%
- 60–70%
- 70–80%
- 80–90%
- 90–100%
No:
- 50–60%
- 60–70%
- 70–80%
- 80–90%
- 90–100%

Amendment 2 results by precinct
Yes:
- 50–60%
- 60–70%
- 70–80%
- 80–90%
- 90–100%
No:
- 50–60%
- 60–70%
- 70–80%
- 80–90%
- 90–100%

Amendment 3 results by precinct
Yes:
- 50–60%
- 60–70%
- 70–80%
- 80–90%
- 90–100%
No:
- 50–60%
- 60–70%
- 70–80%
- 80–90%
- 90–100%

Amendment 4 results by precinct
Yes:
- 50–60%
- 60–70%
- 70–80%
- 80–90%
- 90–100%
No:
- 50–60%
- 60–70%
- 70–80%
- 80–90%
- 90–100%

Amendment 5 results by precinct
Yes:
- 50–60%
- 60–70%
- 70–80%
- 80–90%
- 90–100%
No:
- 50–60%
- 60–70%
- 70–80%
- 80–90%
- 90–100%

Amendment 6 results by precinct
Yes:
- 50–60%
- 60–70%
- 70–80%
- 80–90%
- 90–100%
No:
- 50–60%
- 60–70%
- 70–80%
- 80–90%
- 90–100%

Amendment 7 results by precinct
Yes:
- 50–60%
- 60–70%
- 70–80%
- 80–90%
- 90–100%
No:
- 50–60%
- 60–70%
- 70–80%
- 80–90%
- 90–100%

Amendment 8 results by precinct
Yes:
- 50–60%
- 60–70%
- 70–80%
- 80–90%
- 90–100%
No:
- 50–60%
- 60–70%
- 70–80%
- 80–90%
- 90–100%

Amendment 9 results by precinct
Yes:
- 50–60%
- 60–70%
- 70–80%
- 80–90%
- 90–100%
No:
- 50–60%
- 60–70%
- 70–80%
- 80–90%
- 90–100%

Amendment 10 results by precinct
Yes:
- 50–60%
- 60–70%
- 70–80%
- 80–90%
- 90–100%
No:
- 50–60%
- 60–70%
- 70–80%
- 80–90%
- 90–100%

Ratification Question results by precinct
Yes:
- 50–60%
- 60–70%
- 70–80%
- 80–90%
- 90–100%
No:
- 50–60%
- 60–70%
- 70–80%
- 80–90%
- 90–100%
