= Wes Long =

American politician

Member of the Alabama House of Representatives from the 27th district
- In office November 3, 2010 – November 5, 2014
- Preceded by: Jeffrey McLaughlin
- Succeeded by: Will Ainsworth

Personal details
- Born: August 13, 1977 (age 48) Guntersville, Alabama
- Party: Republican

Wes Long (born August 13, 1977) is an American politician who served in the Alabama House of Representatives from the 27th district from 2010 to 2014.
