= William C. Thompson (Alabama judge) =

American judge

Presiding Judge of the Alabama Court of Civil Appeals
- In office 2007 – February 1, 2024
- Succeeded by: Terry A. Moore

Judge of the Alabama Court of Civil Appeals
- In office 1996 – February 1, 2024
- Succeeded by: Bill Lewis

Personal details
- Born: January 1962 (age 64)
- Party: Republican
- Education: University of Alabama B.A. Cumberland School of Law J.D.

William Cooper Thompson (born January 1962) is a former presiding judge of the Alabama Court of Civil Appeals. He was first elected to the court in November 1996. At the time of his retirement in 2024 he was the longest tenured Judge in Alabama among all three of the state's statewide elected courts.

== Education ==
Thompson received his Bachelor of Arts degree from the University of Alabama and his Juris Doctor from Cumberland School of Law at Samford University. Graduated from Stanhope Elmore High School.

== Legal career ==
Thompson practiced law in both Birmingham and Montgomery, including serving as the assistant legal advisor to the Governor of Alabama.

== Alabama court service ==
He was elected to the Court of Civil Appeals in 1996 and was reelected to the court in 2002, 2008, 2014, and 2020. He became presiding judge of the Court of Civil Appeals in 2007.

Thompson retired on February 1, 2024.

== Personal ==
Thompson is a registered Republican.
