= Rosedale Historic District (Homewood, Alabama) =

Historic district in Alabama, United States

- U.S. National Register of Historic Places
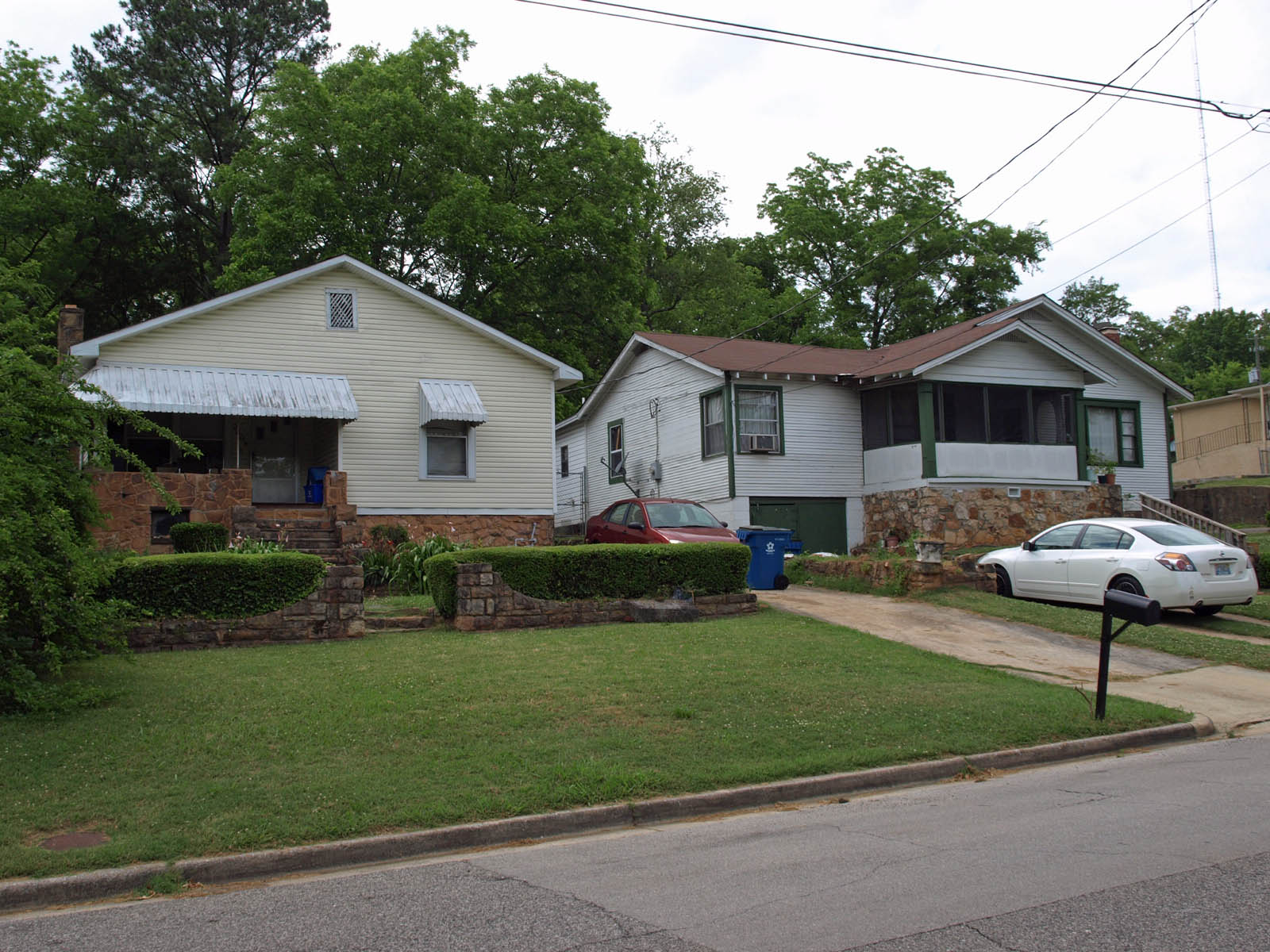

- Location within Alabama
- Location: Roughly bounded by 25th Court S, Central Ave., 27th Court S., Loveless/BM Montgomery St., Homewood, Alabama
- Coordinates: 33°29′07″N 86°47′39″W
- Area: 250 acres (1.0 km^{2})
- Built by: Morris, Eugene
- Architectural style: Late Victorian, Late Gothic Revival
- NRHP reference No.: 04000236
- Added to NRHP: March 31, 2004

The Rosedale Historic District in Homewood, Alabama is a historic district which was listed on the National Register of Historic Places in 2004. The listing included 143 contributing buildings on 250 acres (1.0 km^{2}). Another part of the Rosedale Neighborhood is included in the NRHP as Rosedale Park Historic District (Homewood, Alabama).

It is a hilly residential neighborhood, located somewhat inaccessibly over Red Mountain ridge, from Birmingham, Alabama. Developers could not develop the property for white families, but the lack of transportation options did not dissuade black families, with less choices, from choosing to live there. It grew as a working and middle class African American neighborhood. It was surrounded by white suburbs and not allowed to expand.

It has many of "the best examples of working and middle class architecture, including residential/domestic, commercial, and religious, built c. late 1880s-1953 by and for African Americans in Jefferson County and the State of Alabama. Vernacular residential styles include many shotgun houses, particularly the concentration that remains on Loveless Street as well as a variety of bungalows and duplexes."

The history of the Rosedale Neighborhood has been documented by several local history projects by students and faculty from Samford University.
