= 2026 Alabama Attorney General election =

- November 3, 2026
Candidate	Katherine Robertson	Jeff McLaughlin
Party	Republican	Democratic
Popular vote	910,007	743,547
Percentage	55.0%	45.0%
- Robertson: 50–60% 60–70% 70–80% 80–90% McLaughlin: 50–60% 60–70% 70–80% 80–90%
Attorney General before election
Steve Marshall
Republican
Elected Attorney General
Katherine Robertson
Republican

The 2026 Alabama Attorney General election was held on November 3, 2026, to elect the Attorney General of Alabama. Primary elections were held on May 19, and the primary runoff election was held on June 16. Two-term incumbent Steve Marshall was term-limited and ineligible to run for re-election. He instead ran for U.S. Senate. Republican candidate Katherine Robertson won the race becoming the first women to be elected as Alabama’s Attorney General.

== Republican primary ==
=== Candidates ===
==== Nominee ====
- Katherine Robertson, chief counsel to the attorney general

==== Eliminated in runoff ====
- Jay Mitchell, former associate justice of the Alabama Supreme Court (2019–2025)

==== Eliminated in primary ====
- Pamela Casey, district attorney of Blount County

==== Declined ====
- Caroleene Dobson, nominee for Alabama's 2nd congressional district in 2024 (running for secretary of state)
- Arthur Orr, state senator from the 3rd district (2006–present)
- Lloyd Peeples, assistant U.S. attorney (running for state house)

=== Endorsements ===
Pamela Casey

Local officials

- 18 district attorneys
- 33 current and former law enforcement officials
Jay Mitchell

Local officials

- Shannon Oliver, Franklin County sheriff (2011–present)
- Max Sanders, Lawrence County sheriff (2018–present)

Organizations

- Alabama Citizens for Life
- Alabama Realtors PAC
- Alabama Trucking Association
- Business Council of Alabama
- Electric Cooperatives of Alabama
- Alabama Rural Electric Association
Katherine Robertson

U.S. representatives

- David McIntosh, former IN-02 (1995–2001)

Statewide officials

- Steve Marshall, attorney general of Alabama (2017–present)

Local officials

- Todd Strange, former mayor of Montgomery (2009–2019)

Individuals

- Alan E. Sears, lawyer and founder of Alliance Defending Freedom

Organizations

- Alabama Farmers Federation
- Alabama Forestry Association
- Associated Builders and Contractors of Alabama
- Club for Growth
- National Rifle Association Political Victory Fund
- Republican Attorneys General Association

=== Fundraising ===
Campaign finance reports as of May 18, 2026
Candidate	Raised	Other receipts	Spent	Cash on hand
Pamela Casey (R)	$200,955	$510,027	$194,902	$516,079
Jay Mitchell (R)	$3,858,081	$84,801	$3,903,530	$39,352
Katherine Robertson (R)	$4,440,340	$6,681	$4,404,626	$42,395
Source: Alabama FCPA

=== Polling ===
Poll source	Date(s) administered	Sample size (Note: Key: A – all adults RV – registered voters LV – likely voters V – unclear)	Margin of error	Pamela Casey	Jay Mitchell	Katherine Robertson	Undecided
Remington Research Group (R)	May 5–7, 2026	589 (LV)	± –	12%	14%	25%	48%
Cygnal (R) (Note: Poll sponsored by Gray Television and Alabama Daily News)	April 29–30, 2026	500 (LV)	± 4.4%	11%	14%	27%	48%
American Pulse Research (R)	March 30–April 1, 2026	505 (LV)	± 4.4%	3%	11%	11%	71%
The Alabama Poll	March 22–24, 2026	600 (LV)	± 4.0%	9%	12%	10%	69%
1892 Polling (R) (Note: Poll sponsored by Mitchell's campaign)	March 5, 2026 (Note: Date poll was published)	638 (LV)	–	9%	12%	6%	74%
Remington Research Group	January 16–19, 2026	775 (LV)	± 3.5%	8%	9%	8%	75%
The Alabama Poll	December 15, 2025	600 (LV)	± 4.0%	7%	12%	10%	72%
The Alabama Poll	August 24–26, 2025	600 (LV)	± 4.0%	7%	13%	6%	74%

=== Debates and forums ===
2026 Alabama Attorney General Republican primary debates and forums
No.	Date	Host	Moderator	Link	Republican	Republican	Republican
Key: P Participant A Absent N Not invited I Invited W Withdrawn							
Key: P Participant A Absent N Not invited I Invited W Withdrawn					Casey	Mitchell	Robertson
1	February 2, 2026	Point Clear Republican Women	Bryan Dawson	Rumble	P	P	P
2	February 12, 2026	Eastern Shore Republican Women	Jeff Poor	N/A	P	A	P

=== Results ===
Primary results by county: Robertson: 30–40%; 40–50%; 50–60%; 70–80%; Mitchell: 30–40%; 40–50%; 50–60%; Casey: 40–50%; 50–60%

Republican primary results
Party	Candidate	Votes	%
Republican	Katherine Robertson	189,183	40.5
Republican	Jay Mitchell	160,616	34.4
Republican	Pamela L. Casey	116,931	25.1
Total votes		466,730	100.0

=== Runoff ===
==== Fundraising ====
Campaign finance reports as of June 15, 2026
Candidate	Raised	Other receipts	Spent	Cash on hand
Jay Mitchell (R)	$4,641,731	$85,426	$4,694,510	$32,647
Katherine Robertson (R)	$5,835,468	$6,735	$5,804,582	$37,621
Source: Alabama FCPA

==== Polling ====
Poll source	Date(s) administered	Sample size	Margin of error	Jay Mitchell	Katherine Robertson	Undecided
The Alabama Poll	May 28, 2026	600 (LV)	± 4.0%	31%	49%	20%

==== Results ====
Runoff results by county: Robertson: 50–60%; 60–70%; 80–90%; Mitchell: 50–60%

Republican primary runoff
Party	Candidate	Votes	%
Republican	Katherine Robertson	168,424	55.1
Republican	Jay Mitchell	137,412	44.9
Total votes		305,836	100.0

== Democratic primary ==
=== Candidates ===
==== Nominee ====
- Jeff McLaughlin, former state representative from the 27th district (2001–2010)

=== Fundraising ===
Campaign finance reports as of May 18, 2026
Candidate	Raised	Other receipts	Spent	Cash on hand
Jeff McLaughlin (D)	$0	$0	$0	$0
Source: Alabama FCPA

== General election ==
=== Post-primary endorsements ===
Katherine Robertson (R)

Organizations

- Manufacture Alabama
Jeff McLaughlin (D)

Labor unions

- Alabama AFL-CIO
- United Mine Workers of America COMPAC

=== Predictions ===
Source	Ranking	As of
Sabato's Crystal Ball	Safe R	August 21, 2025

=== Fundraising ===
Campaign finance reports as of November 2, 2026
Candidate	Raised	Other receipts	Spent	Cash on hand
Katherine Robertson (R)	$7,926,575	$8,005	$6,270,455	$599,126
Jeff McLaughlin (D)	$50,920	$0	$44,817	$6,102
Source: Alabama FCPA

=== Polling ===
Poll source	Date(s) administered	Sample size	Margin of error	Katherine Robertson (R)	Jeff McLaughlin (D)	Undecided
Cygnal (R) (Note: Poll conducted for Alabama Daily News and Gray Media Alabama)	October 16–17, 2026	500 (LV)	± 4.4%	51%	34%	15%
The Alabama Poll	October 15–16, 2026	600 (LV)	—	54%	35%	11%
yes. every kid.	July 8–11, 2026	601 (LV)	± 4.0%	47%	31%	23%

=== Results ===
2026 Alabama Attorney General election
Party	Candidate	Votes	%	±%
Republican	Katherine Robertson	920,412	55.0%	
Democratic	Jeff McLaughlin	753,457	45.0%	
Total votes		1,673,869	100.0%	
Republican hold				

== Notes ==
Partisan clients
