= Scott Donaldson (judge) =

American judge

Scott W. Donaldson

Judge of the Alabama Court of Civil Appeals
- In office January 16, 2013 – January 2021
- Appointed by: Robert Bentley
- Succeeded by: Matt Fridy

Judge of the Alabama 6th District Circuit Court
- In office 2003 – January 16, 2013

Personal details
- Born: Scott William Donaldson
- Party: Republican
- Education: University of Alabama, B.A. Cumberland School of Law, J.D.

Scott William Donaldson is a Former Judge of the Alabama Court of Civil Appeals.

== Education ==
Donaldson received his Bachelor of Arts degree in commerce and business administration from the University of Alabama in 1981, and he received his Juris Doctor from the Cumberland School of Law, graduating cum laude in 1984.

== Legal career ==
Prior to his appointment to the Court of Civil Appeals, Donaldson served as a judge from 2003 to 2013 on Alabama's sixth judicial circuit court. He was elected to a full six-year term in 2004 and was re-elected in 2010. He also spent 18 years in private practice.

== Alabama Supreme Court consideration ==
In 2011 Donaldson considered running for a seat on the Alabama Supreme Court but ultimately dropped out due to financial reasons.

== Service on Alabama Court of Civil Appeals ==
On January 15, 2013 Governor Robert Bentley appointed Donaldson to the Alabama Court of Civil Appeals.

== Teaching ==
He is a faculty member at the National Judicial College where he has taught several advanced evidence courses to judges throughout the country, and has taught courses for judicial associations in several states. He also is an adjunct professor for the University of Alabama School of Law.

== Personal life ==
Donaldson is a registered Republican.
