= Terri Willingham Thomas =

American judge

Judge of the Alabama Court of Civil Appeals
- In office 2007 – January 13, 2019

Personal details
- Born: October 13, 1964 (age 61)
- Party: Republican
- Education: Athens State University; Wallace State Community College; Cumberland School of Law J.D.

Terri Willingham Thomas (born October 13, 1964) is an American politician who served as a Judge of the Alabama Court of Civil Appeals from 2007–2019.

== Early life and education ==
Thomas was born October 13, 1964. She earned undergraduate degrees from Athens State University and Wallace State Community College and her Juris Doctor from the Cumberland School of Law.

== Legal career ==
Upon graduation from law school, Thomas practiced law in Cullman County. Prior to joining the court of civil appeals, Thomas sat as a district court judge in Cullman County beginning in 1996. She was the first woman to serve as a district court judge in Cullman County. She is also the first resident of Cullman County to serve on a state court in 34 years.

In addition to acting as a District and Juvenile Court Judge, she served as President of the Alabama Juvenile and Family Courts Judges Association from 2004–2005, and on the Faculty of the Alabama Judicial College. She has also served as a member of Alabama's Juvenile Code Revision Committee, the Judicial System Legislative Coordinating Council, the Standing Committee on Juvenile Procedure, and the Standing Committee on Rules of Conduct and Canons of Judicial Ethics.

== Service on the Alabama Court of Civil Appeals ==
An issue that arose during her 2006 campaign for a seat in the Alabama Criminal Court of Appeals was her family ties to the Ku Klux Klan, a connection which Thomas had repeatedly denied. She won the runoff against her fellow Republican contender Phillip Wood. She went on to win the general election against opponent Jim McFerrin.

In the 2018 Republican primary, Thomas was defeated by Chad Hanson.

== Tenure ==
During her time on the bench Thomas has called for Alabama to abandon the practice of common-law marriage.

== Personal ==
Thomas is a registered Republican. She currently resides in Cullman, Alabama.
