= Will Parker (judge) =

American judge and lawyer

Associate Justice of the Alabama Supreme Court
- Incumbent
- Assumed office November 10, 2025
- Appointed by: Kay Ivey
- Preceded by: Bill Lewis

Personal details
- Party: Republican
- Education: Davidson College (BA); University of Alabama (JD)

Will Parker is an American judge and lawyer who has served as an associate justice of the Alabama Supreme Court since 2025. He is a member of the Alabama Republican Party.

== Education ==
Parker received an undergraduate degree from Davidson College in 2002. He graduated from the University of Alabama School of Law in 2006.

== Career ==
Parker began working with Kay Ivey, the governor of Alabama, in 2017. He became her general counsel in 2019. On November 10, 2025, he was appointed to the Alabama Supreme Court by Ivey.

Legal offices
| Preceded by Bill Lewis | Associate Justice of the Alabama Supreme Court; 2025–present | Incumbent |
