= Jeff McLaughlin =

American politician

Member of the Alabama House of Representatives
- Incumbent
- Assumed office January 2001
- Succeeded by: Wes Long
- Constituency: 25th district (2001–2003); 27th district (2003–2011)

Personal details
- Party: Democratic
- Spouse: Stacy McLaughlin
- Education: Birmingham–Southern College (BA); Harvard University (JD)

Jeffrey McLaughlin is an American politician who served as a member of the Alabama House of Representatives from 2001 to 2011. A member of the Alabama Democratic Party, he is also the Democratic nominee in the 2026 Alabama Attorney General election.

== Career ==
=== Alabama House of Representatives ===
Following a special election, McLaughlin was seated in January 2001, representing District 25 under the state's pre-2002 legislative map. Following redistricting after the 2000 census, he represented District 27 from 2002. He did not accept campaign contributions during his time in office, only using personal money to fund his campaigns. He introduced legislation in each session he was a part of to ban political action committee (PAC) to PAC transfers, which are used to hide the movement of money from donors to candidates. The legislation passed the house each year but always failed in the Alabama Senate. He was defeated by Wes Long in 2010, and attempted to reclaim his seat in 2014, but was defeated by Will Ainsworth.

=== 2025 Guntersville mayoral election ===
McLaughlin ran for mayor of Guntersville, Alabama, in 2025. He and incumbent mayor Leigh Dollar tied on August 26, 2025. In the runoff election held the following month, Dollar defeated McLaughlin by 500 votes.
