= Will Ainsworth =

American politician (born 1981)

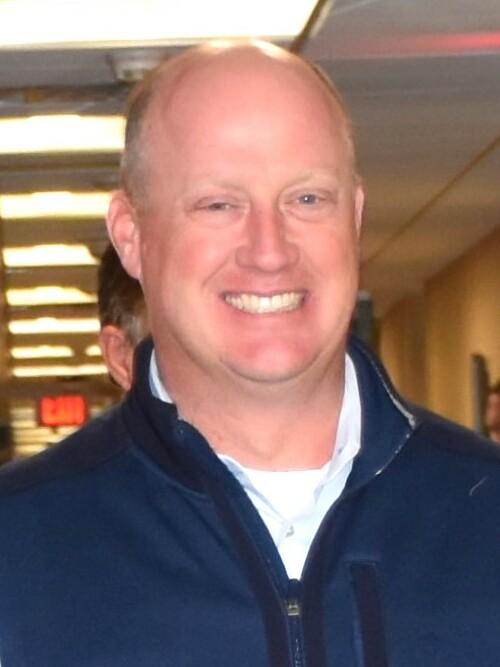
- Ainsworth in 2023

31st Lieutenant Governor of Alabama
- Incumbent
- Assumed office January 14, 2019
- Governor: Kay Ivey
- Preceded by: Kay Ivey^{[nb]}

Member of the Alabama House of Representatives from the 27th district
- In office November 4, 2014 – November 7, 2018
- Preceded by: Wes Long
- Succeeded by: Wes Kitchens

Personal details
- Born: March 22, 1981 (age 45) Birmingham, Alabama, U.S.
- Party: Republican
- Spouse: Kendall Foster
- Children: 3
- Education: Auburn University (BA)
- n.b. Office vacant between April 10, 2017 and January 14, 2019

William Ainsworth (born March 22, 1981) is an American politician serving as the 31st lieutenant governor of Alabama since 2019. He previously served in the Alabama House of Representatives from 2014 to 2018, representing its 27th district.

Ainsworth ran for the Republican nomination for lieutenant governor in 2018, and won the primary following a runoff election. He was re-elected in 2022 without Democratic opposition.

== Early life and education ==
Ainsworth was born in Birmingham, Alabama, in 1981, to Billy and Sharon Ainsworth. He was raised in Boaz, Alabama, and his mother Sharon was the director of the Real Life Crisis Pregnancy Center in Marshall County, Alabama, which encourages adoption. His father is a member of the Auburn University Board of Trustees and is the former CEO of Progress Rail and a former group president of Caterpillar Inc. Ainsworth graduated from the Westbrook Christian School in 1999, then attended Auburn University and attained a bachelor's degree in marketing in 2004.

Ainsworth first worked as a youth pastor at Grace Fellowship Presbyterian Church in Albertville, Alabama. He co-founded a hunting lodge in Guntersville with his brother Austin in 2003, and helped create the Tennessee Valley Hunting & Fishing Expo trade show in Huntsville in 2011. During his career in business, he served on various wildlife and hunting committees, as well as the board of directors of the Fellowship of Christian Athletes organization. Ainsworth also worked in real estate as the owner of Ainsworth Real Estate and Ainsworth Homes in Guntersville.

== Alabama House of Representatives ==
In the 2014 election cycle, Ainsworth ran as the Republican Party nominee for the Alabama House of Representatives' 27th district, which included parts of Marshall County and DeKalb County. The incumbent, Wes Long, chose not to run for re-election. Ainsworth was unopposed in the Republican primary and faced Democratic nominee and former representative Jeff McLaughlin in the November general election. When describing his reasons for his candidacy, Ainsworth said that he hoped to fight back against "career politicians", positioning himself as an outsider, and to prevent regulation of small businesses. Ainsworth campaigned on what he called his top three priorities as a state legislator: "jobs, jobs and jobs". He participated in a forum debate with McLaughlin in October 2014, and was endorsed by the Alabama Retail Association PAC. Ainsworth won the general election with 59% of the vote.

During his tenure in the Alabama House of Representatives, Ainsworth served on the House committees for Agriculture and Forestry, Ethics and Campaign Finance, State Parks, Public Safety and Homeland Security; as well as Transportation, Utilities and Infrastructure. Ainsworth was an opponent of same-sex marriage while in office. In 2015, he encouraged the probate judge of Marshall County to not issue marriage licenses to same-sex couples, and called same-sex marriage an "immoral [attack] on traditional marriage". He also criticized Roy Moore's suspension from the Alabama Supreme Court over legal disputes regarding same-sex marriage, saying that the Southern Poverty Law Center was attacking "godly men" and forcing "immoral and dangerous beliefs onto society".

Ainsworth was opposed to a decision made by Governor Robert Bentley to remove the Flags of the Confederate States of America, along with the Confederate Battle Flag on the grounds of the Alabama State Capitol; the Confederate Memorial Monument where the flags were situated was not removed. Ainsworth supported the Alabama Memorial Preservation Act of 2017, signed by Governor Kay Ivey that prohibits local authorities from removing monuments or renaming public schools that have existed for over 40 years.

During the 2016 United States presidential election, Ainsworth served as the Alabama state chairman for Marco Rubio's campaign in the Republican primary. Following the revelation of Governor Robert J. Bentley's extramarital affair in 2016, Ainsworth attempted to introduce a recall election process in Alabama, which did not exist at the time of Bentley's scandal. Although his efforts received coverage in The Washington Post, the proposal did not become law. He also sponsored ethics-focused legislation to enact term limits and remove office holders who abuse their position. Ainsworth's other work as a legislator included workforce development and encouraging adoption as an alternative to abortion.

In February 2018, Ainsworth introduced a bill (HB-435) to arm teachers on school campuses in the aftermath of the Stoneman Douglas High School shooting. Although Ainsworth called on Governor Kay Ivey to convene a special legislative session for school safety, the bill ultimately failed in the yearly session.

== Lieutenant Governor of Alabama ==
In June 2017, Ainsworth announced his candidacy for Lieutenant Governor of Alabama in the 2018 election cycle. The office had been vacant since Kay Ivey's ascension to the governorship after Robert Bentley's resignation. During the Republican primary for lieutenant governor, Ainsworth received the endorsement of Senator Marco Rubio, whose state campaign he had previously chaired. In September 2017, Ainsworth was named by Yellowhammer News as one of the people "who will be running Alabama in a few years". In the June 2018 primary, Ainsworth finished in second place behind Twinkle Cavanaugh, the president of the Alabama Public Service Commission. The two advanced to a runoff election in July, as neither attained 50% of the vote.

The runoff between Ainsworth and Cavanaugh became bitter; Cavanaugh attacked Ainsworth with the claim he had been convicted for petty theft while in college. Ainsworth denied the allegation and called Cavanaugh a liar. In an interview with the Alabama Political Reporter, Ainsworth presented a letter from the Jackson County Sheriff's Office that stated he had never been convicted of such a crime and only held a minor boating infraction with the department. He admitted that he had been arrested for what he called a "college prank" in which fiberglass tigers were stolen, but no charges were ever filed against Ainsworth and the statues were returned. Ainsworth ultimately defeated Cavanaugh in the runoff election with 51% of the vote. Following his victory in the runoff, the Alabama Political Reporter called Ainsworth a "rising voice within the Alabama Republican Party". He then won the general election against Democratic nominee Will Boyd with 61% of the vote.

As the lieutenant governor of Alabama and thus presiding officer of the Alabama Senate, Ainsworth has advocated for numerous conservative legislative actions, including Alabama's 2019 abortion bill (HB-314). When an exemption for rape and incest was struck from the bill, Democratic state senators accused Ainsworth of gaveling the removal too quickly. Ainsworth defended his position afterwards and called abortion murder, emphasizing his desire for the state legislature to pass abortion restrictions. Ainsworth has also promoted a ban on critical race theory and supported school choice, as well as constitutional carry.

During the COVID-19 pandemic, Ainsworth came into conflict with Governor Kay Ivey over her response to the virus. He wrote an open letter criticizing the state's level of preparedness in March 2020 as the pandemic emerged in the state; Ivey responded to the letter by calling it unhelpful. In April 2020, Ainsworth urged Ivey to reopen businesses that had been closed in the initial response; in July, he called Ivey's newly-decreed mask mandate an "overstep" infringing on civil liberties. In October, Ainsworth himself tested positive for COVID-19, but recovered and returned to work within a week.

Ainsworth called for the impeachment of Joe Biden during an appearance at a rally for Donald Trump in Cullman in August 2021. In 2022, Ainsworth stepped in to become involved with a controversy regarding the police department of Brookside, Alabama. Following reports that Brookside had engaged in aggressive ticketing as a speed trap, Ainsworth requested a state audit of the town and its police department. This audit eventually occurred via an investigation of Brookside by the Alabama Department of Examiners of Public Accounts. In March 2022, Ainsworth and his office helped introduce legislation to prevent similar occurrences in the state.

In the 2022 election cycle, Ainsworth faced no challenger in the Republican primary for lieutenant governor. Additionally, no Democratic candidate qualified to run against Ainsworth. His only opposition in the general election was Libertarian nominee Ruth Page-Nelson. Ainsworth was re-elected with 83% of the vote. In 2023, 1819 News described Ainsworth as having been "instrumental" in the gradual repeal of Alabama's grocery tax. The partial repeal, under House Bill 479 authored by Danny Garrett and Andrew Jones, was passed unanimously in June 2023 and was praised by Ainsworth as a "bold first step" to removing the grocery tax completely, which Ainsworth said was his ultimate goal. In August 2023, Ainsworth endorsed Donald Trump in the 2024 Republican Party presidential primaries, saying that he believed Trump would "undo all the damage President Biden has done".

Although Ainsworth had not announced a candidacy, he was endorsed for the 2026 Alabama gubernatorial election by Nathaniel Ledbetter, the speaker of the Alabama House of Representatives. In July 2023, 1819 News called Ainsworth a "prohibitive favorite" to succeed Governor Kay Ivey in 2026. However, in May 2025, Ainsworth announced that he would not run for governor in 2026 and would instead return to the private sector, following the completion of his tenure as lieutenant governor. The announcement came amid reports that U.S. Senator Tommy Tuberville would run for governor, supplanting Ainsworth as a potential frontrunner.

== Personal life ==
Ainsworth is married to Kendall Foster; they have three children together. He is a Baptist and attends Gilliam Springs Baptist Church in Arab, Alabama, with his family.

== Electoral history ==
Electoral history of Will Ainsworth
Year	Office	Party	Primary						General			Result	Swing	Ref.
Year	Office	Party	Total	%	P.	Runoff	%	P.	Total	%	P.	Result	Swing	Ref.
2014	State Representative	Republican							7,355	59.7%	1st	Won	Hold	
2018	Lieutenant Governor	Republican	205,017	37.1%	2nd	176,873	51.5%	1st	1,044,941	61.3%	1st	Won	Hold	
2022	Lieutenant Governor	Republican							957,534	83.6%	1st	Won	Hold	

Party political offices
Preceded by Kay Ivey	Republican nominee for Lieutenant Governor of Alabama; 2018, 2022	Most recent
Alabama House of Representatives
Preceded by Wes Long	Member of the Alabama House of Representatives from the 27th district 2014–2018	Succeeded by Wes Kitchens
Political offices
Vacant Title last held by Kay Ivey	Lieutenant Governor of Alabama; 2019–present	Incumbent
