= Elizabeth Pittman =

American judge

Elizabeth Davis Pittman (June 3, 1921 – April 8, 1998) was an American jurist who served as both the first woman judge and the first black judge in the state of Nebraska.

Born in Iowa, she moved in her youth to Omaha, Nebraska, where she would later earn a law degree. By the time she graduated, she was the first black woman lawyer in the state, and one of only a few in the western United States. She was elected as the first black person to serve on the board of Omaha Public Schools in 1950, appointed the first woman deputy county attorney and the first black deputy county attorney in Douglas County in 1964, and the first black woman appointed by a governor to a judgeship in the United States in 1971. She retired in 1986 at age 65.

== Early life ==
Elizabeth (or Betty) Pittman was born Elizabeth Ann Davis on June 3, 1921, in Council Bluffs, Iowa, moving with her family soon to Omaha, Nebraska. Her mother, Mabel Davis, was a librarian, and her father, Charles Davis, was a lawyer and leader in the local black community. Mr. Davis established Carver Savings and Loan, the first black-owned bank in the area, which lent money to the local community to purchase homes and closed in 1965. Pittman attended Omaha North High School, a school outside of the local black community, where she graduated in 1938.

On Christmas Day in 1942, Elizabeth married Dr. Arthur B. Pittman (1915-1990), Omaha's first Black veterinarian. They had one daughter, Antoinette Marguerite "Toni" Pittman (1947-2018). The Pittmans eventually divorced.

Pittman later attended the University of Nebraska and Creighton University, the latter of which awarded her a law degree in 1948. She was the first black woman to graduate from Creighton's law school. In the 1950 census—the first after she had graduated—she was the sole black woman lawyer in the state, and one of only 13 west of Illinois. At age 28, she swore into the United States District Court for the District of Nebraska with her father attending.

== Career ==
In 1950, she was the first black person to be elected to the board of Omaha Public Schools. She served on the board until 1952, when she resigned.

Soon after graduating from law school, she entered private practice with the help of her father, and by 1964, was only one of two women lawyers operating private practice in the city. That year, she was named a deputy county attorney, the first woman and the first black deputy county attorney for Douglas County. She served in this role until 1971.

On April 9, 1971, after being nominated by governor J. James Exon, she was sworn in as a municipal court judge in Omaha, becoming at the time the first black person to serve as a judge in the city. Exon had nominated her from a list created by a nominating commission, and as she was not likely to have been popularly elected to the post, a Nebraska newspaper said the commission was "due commendation". Two years into her tenure, she had become one of only 39 black women judges in the country; according to the Omaha Star, she was the first black woman to be appointed a judge by any governor in the United States.

== Retirement and death ==
On July 21, 1986, just a month after her 65th birthday, she sent a letter to governor Bob Kerrey announcing her intention to retire on October 1 of that year. The mandatory retirement age for judges in Nebraska was 72 years old, and she was due for a referendum on whether to retain her as a judge that November; nearly 60 percent of polled attorneys believed she should not be retained. With her retirement going into effect, Donna Polk (a director for a multicultural organization in Lincoln) said there was "an ethnic vacuum" left over, with few role models left for young black women.

Pittman died on April 8, 1998. Creighton's law school has an educational building named after her.

== Judge Elizabeth D. Pittman Award ==
In 1998, Creighton Law School and the Black American Law Students Association established the Judge Elizabeth D. Pittman Award, which has occasionally been bestowed upon a law school "Black graduate who possesses the same qualities of excellence, perseverance, and dedication that made Judge Pittman such a truly outstanding role model for all law students and lawyers."
