= 2020 Florida Amendment 1 =

- Citizenship requirement to vote in Florida elections

Results
Choice	Votes	%
Yes	8,307,109	79.29%
No	2,169,684	20.71%
Valid votes	10,476,793	94.01%
Invalid or blank votes	668,062	5.99%
Total votes	11,144,855	100.00%
Registered voters/turnout	14,441,869	77.17%

Yes
90–100%
80–90%
70–80%
60–70%
50–60%
No
90–100%
60–70%
50–60%
Other
Tie
No data

2020 Florida Amendment 1 is an amendment to the Constitution of Florida that passed on November 3, 2020, via a statewide referendum. The amendment changes the state constitution to make citizenship a requirement to vote in the state of Florida. Every county in the state voted in favor of the amendment.

== Contents ==
The amendment, which was present on all statewide ballots in the November 3, 2020 election, read as follows:

No. 1 Constitutional Amendment Article VI, Section 2. This amendment provides that only United States Citizens who are at least eighteen years of age, a permanent resident of Florida, and registered to vote, as provided by law, shall be qualified to vote in a Florida election.

== Results ==
Florida Amendment 1 (2020)
Choice	Votes	%
Yes	8,307,109	79.3%
No	2,169,684	20.7%
Total votes	10,476,793	100.0%
Registered voters and turnout	14,441,869	72.5%

== See also ==
- 2020 Alabama Amendment 1
