= Katherine Robertson =

American attorney and politician (born 1984)

Attorney General of Alabama
- Elect
- Assuming office January 2027
- Governor: Tommy Tuberville (elect)
- Succeeding: Steve Marshall

Personal details
- Born: Katherine Kincey Green; August 3, 1984 (age 42) Selma, Alabama, U.S.
- Party: Republican
- Spouse: Ryan Robertson (m. 2010)
- Education: Auburn University (BS); University of Alabama (JD)

Katherine Kincey Robertson (née Green) is an American attorney and politician. She is the first female attorney general-elect of Alabama. Robertson has worked as the chief counsel to the attorney general since March 29, 2017, and previously worked as a senior advisor.

== Early life and education ==
Robertson was born in Dallas County, Alabama. She graduated from John T. Morgan Academy in 2002. She earned a Bachelor of Science in political science from Auburn University. While at Auburn she served as the Vice President of Membership for the Kappa Delta Sorority. She also received a Juris Doctor degree in 2010 from the University of Alabama School of Law.

== Career ==
After graduation, Robertson serve as legislative counsel for U.S. senator Jeff Sessions, where she worked on legislation relating to crime, drugs, and national security.

Between April 2013 and November 2016 she worked for the right wing think-tank Alabama Policy Institute, first as Senior Policy Counsel then as the Vice President.

Robertson then began working for the Alabama Attorney General's office as a Senior Advisor in December 2016. She was then appointed as the chief counsel to the attorney general by Steve Marshall in March 2017.

In her tenure, the office saw conflict with the Alabama Department of Corrections (ADOC) over a lawsuit. The department had alleged that the attorney general's office had prevented the ADOC from settling federal lawsuits. Robertson wrote a letter denying that they were preventing the settlement.

=== 2026 Attorney General election ===
Robertson announced her campaign in the 2026 election in June 2025. She received over $1 million in dark money donations through November 2025. Jay Mitchell, one of her opponents, criticized her for accepting some of these donations. Robertson said that Mitchell sought the same donations, but Mitchell denied that he ever did. Robertson won the election; she is the first woman elected attorney general of Alabama.

== Political positions ==
Robertson joined Marshall and Liz Murrill, the Louisiana Attorney General, in a letter opposing the campaign of Kamala Harris in the 2024 United States presidential election. She supports tough on crime policies, including stronger penalties for gang activity, child exploitation, and illegal immigration.

She is pro-life in relation to abortion.

== Personal life ==
Robertson married Ryan Christopher Robertson on October 9, 2010.

Political offices
Preceded by Steve Marshall	Attorney General of Alabama; Taking office 2027	Elect
