= Russell Bedsole =

American politician

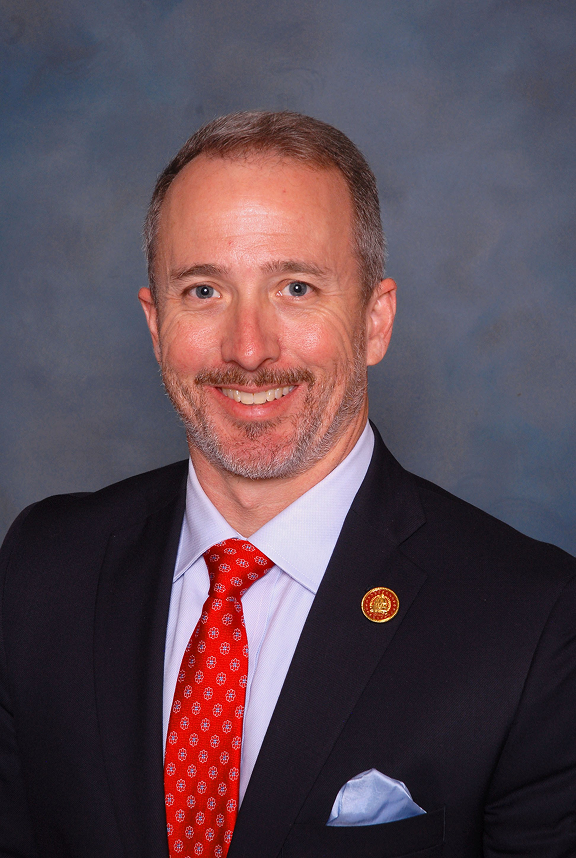

Member of the Alabama House of Representatives from the 49th district
- Incumbent
- Assumed office December 7, 2020
- Preceded by: April Weaver

Personal details
- Born: October 26, 1975 (age 51)
- Party: Republican
- Children: 2
- Education: Auburn University (BA); Troy University (MS)

Russell Bedsole is an American politician and law enforcement officer serving as a Republican member of the Alabama House of Representatives from the 49th district. He was elected in November 2020, and he assumed office on December 7, 2020.

== Education ==
Bedsole earned a Bachelor of Arts degree in criminal justice from Auburn University and a Master of Science in Public Administration from Troy University.

== Career ==
Bedsole is a major in the Shelby County Sheriff's Department. He was also a member of the Alabaster, Alabama City Council. He was elected to the Alabama House of Representatives in November 2020 and assumed office on December 7, 2020.
