= John Crawley (Irish republican) =

American former IRA member and Marine

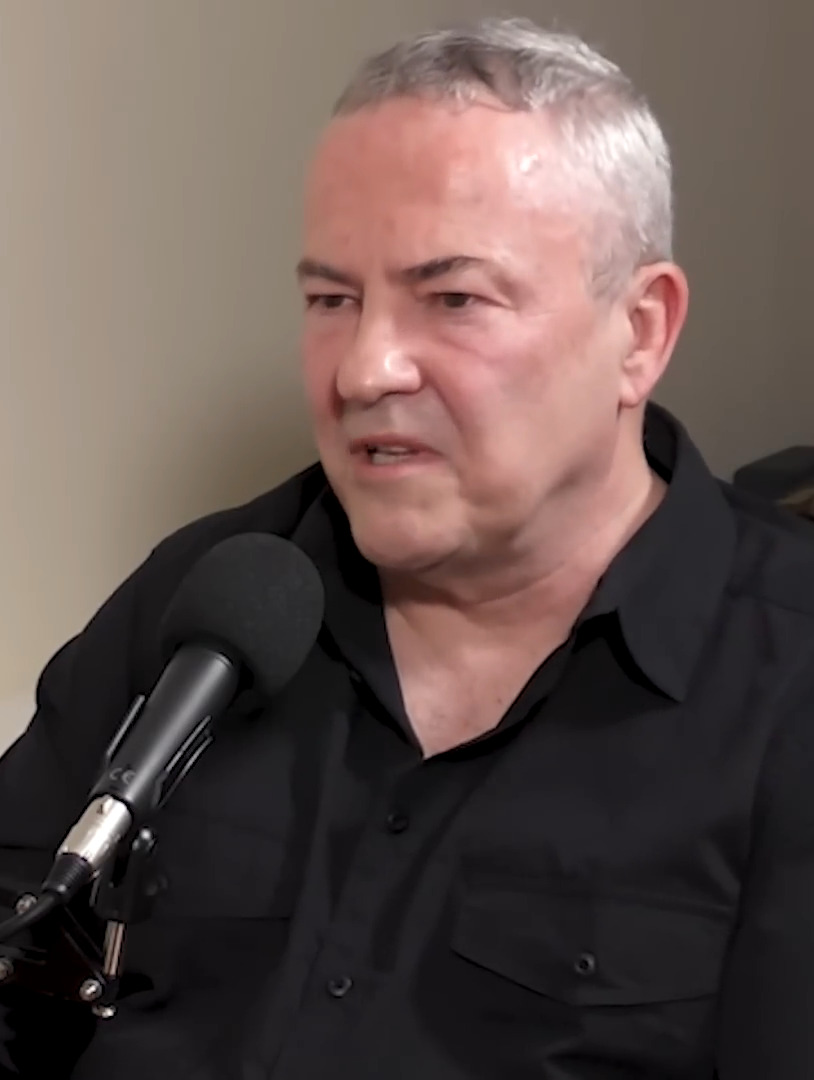
- Crawley in 2022
- Born: 1957 (age 68–69); New York City, United States
- Military career
- Branch: United States Marine Corps; Provisional Irish Republican Army
- Service years: 1975–1979 (USMC); 1980–2000 (IRA)
- Rank: Recon Marine (USMC)
- Nickname: The Yank
- Unit: Force Reconnaissance (USMC)
- Conflicts: The Troubles
- Other work: The Yank: My Life as a Former US Marine in the IRA (2022)

John Crawley is an American former member of the Provisional Irish Republican Army (IRA) and former United States Marine. He is the author of The Yank: My Life as a former US Marine in the IRA, published in September 2022.

== Early life ==
Crawley was born in New York City to Irish immigrant parents. He spent his early years in the United States before moving to Ireland at the age of 14 in 1972. He has described his inclination towards Irish republicanism as "more a process than any one event".

== US Marine Corps ==
Shortly before his 18th birthday, Crawley returned to the United States to enlist in the US Marine Corps. He trained at the Advanced Infantry Training School, Camp Pendleton, California, in October 1975.

He served from 1975 to 1979, rising through the ranks to join a special forces reconnaissance unit known as Recon. He has stated that, even as a teenager, he had planned to join the IRA once his military service was complete. He has suggested that a serious military career might otherwise have been available to him, including, he claims, an invitation to attend the United States Naval Academy at Annapolis.

== Provisional IRA ==
After leaving the Marine Corps in 1979, Crawley returned to Ireland and made contact with the IRA. Because the organisation was clandestine, it took him until 1980 to be admitted. He spent the following four years on active service.

=== Arms Procurement Mission and the Marita Ann Affair ===
In 1983, Crawley met Martin McGuinness for the first time at a pub run by veteran republican John Joe McGirl in Ballinamore, County Leitrim. McGuinness, then an IRA commander, gave Crawley £9,000 and ordered him to travel to the United States to purchase weapons from gun stores, believing that Crawley's American accent would not attract suspicion. During the mission, the two men met regularly in the Botanic Gardens in Dublin. Crawley has written that McGuinness showed little interest in his military training and expertise, and that he became "increasingly frustrated by his military illiteracy". He presented a wish-list of weapons to three members of the IRA Army Council, including the man he believed was then Chief of Staff, that included 106-millimetre recoilless rifles, assault rifles, heavy machine guns, military-grade mortars, RPG-7s, and SAM-7 surface-to-air missiles. McGuinness was not present at that meeting.

While based in Boston, Crawley was introduced to James "Whitey" Bulger, the head of the Winter Hill Gang and one of the most powerful organised crime figures in the city. Crawley told McGuinness that he was "extremely uncomfortable" working with Bulger's criminal network, to which McGuinness replied: "Little old ladies in NORAID can't get us M60 machine guns". Bulger provided the IRA with cash, weapons, and access to his crime network. Crawley has written that while Bulger's associate Pat Nee did most of the operational work, Bulger offered his opinion on IRA operations and once requested that Crawley show him how to construct an under-car booby trap bomb. Crawley declined, falsely claiming he did not know how to make one. Crawley never trusted Bulger, writing: "I never trusted him and could never relax in his company. I was a soldier, but Whitey Bulger was a killer". At one point, Bulger ordered one of his girlfriends to have sex with Crawley, an episode Crawley has described as "excruciatingly embarrassing". Crawley has also stated that he feared that if the gunrunning mission interfered with Bulger's criminal operations, he could end up "in a lobster pot at the bottom of Boston harbour".

In September 1984, Crawley boarded the American trawler Valhalla in Boston with a cargo of approximately 160 firearms and 71,000 rounds of ammunition, valued at $250,000. The vessel encountered a hurricane mid-Atlantic, causing severe damage to the boat. The arms were subsequently transferred to the Irish fishing trawler Marita Ann in the Porcupine Basin over a period of approximately eight hours, by punt, amid Force 6 winds. Shortly before the Marita Ann reached the Kerry coast, it was intercepted by the Irish Naval Service. Garda Special Branch and MI5 informer Sean O'Callaghan is believed to have betrayed the operation, though Crawley has stated his belief that at least one additional informer was also involved. Crawley, Martin Ferris (later a Sinn Féin TD), and others were arrested and convicted. Crawley was sentenced to 10 years in Portlaoise Prison.

=== London Electricity Plot and Second Imprisonment ===
Following his release from Portlaoise, Crawley returned to IRA activities. In the mid-1990s, he was part of an IRA team that planned to bomb electricity substations and cut power supplies to much of London and south-east England. He has stated that a "sympathetic engineer" working for the ESB provided the IRA with information on which transformers to target. Crawley and the team were arrested before the attacks could be carried out. John Grieve, who led Scotland Yard's anti-terror unit from the time of the 1996 Canary Wharf bombing, described Crawley and the other IRA bombers as "the A team", adding that Crawley, as an "ex-US Marine Corps demolition specialist, just epitomised the cunning, skills, experience, of the sort of people they were putting against us". Crawley has also stated that, while in custody, he declined a recruitment approach from the CIA. In 1997, he was sentenced to 35 years in prison. He was released in 2000 under the terms of the Good Friday Agreement.

In October 2019, Crawley appeared in the final episode of the BBC documentary series Spotlight on the Troubles: A Secret History, where he publicly discussed the planned attack on London's electricity grid.

== Views ==
Crawley has been openly critical of the IRA's leadership during the Troubles, arguing that the organisation was "very badly led and very badly organised". He has stated his belief that agents of influence were placed at the highest levels of the republican movement, including potentially on the Army Council, at Northern Command level, and at General Headquarters (GHQ). He has described the British as "masters at counter-insurgency" and has argued that they psychologically profiled the movement to distinguish those determined to pursue the armed campaign from those willing to compromise. He has stated that he deliberately refrains from naming individuals in his book in order not to incriminate them. Crawley has described the Good Friday Agreement as "an internal settlement on British terms" and "a complete military and ideological defeat across the board" for the republican movement.

He has stated he would not have joined the IRA had he known the outcome. Despite his disillusionment, Crawley has said he does not advocate a resumption of armed struggle, noting that there is no political context for it and that it would have no public support.

Crawley delivered a graveside oration for Father Paddy Ryan, a former member of the Catholic Pallottine order who died in County Tipperary aged 95. Ryan had been a major figure in the link between Colonel Muammar Gaddafi's Libyan government and the IRA, and had admitted involvement in the Hyde Park nail bombing of 1982, which killed four soldiers, and the Brighton bomb of 1984, which killed five civilians. Crawley praised Ryan as "both physically and morally courageous" and described him as "a proud unapologetic Irish republican".

In 2022, Crawley delivered the main address at the National Independent Republican Commemoration at Bodenstown, County Kildare, marking the death of Theobald Wolfe Tone in 1798. He stated that those attending would be reminded that "Irish republicanism is fundamentally about replacing sectarian and ethnic divisions with a united civic identity in a sovereign republic".

== The Yank (2022) ==
In September 2022, Crawley published his memoir The Yank: My Life as a former US Marine in the IRA. The book covers his time in the US Marine Corps, his IRA service, his dealings with Whitey Bulger, the Marita Ann affair, his imprisonment, the London electricity plot, and his views on the peace process. Reviewer NJ McGarrigle describes it in the Irish Times as providing "an inside account of the realities of guerrilla warfare, with none of the romanticism attached".
