= 2022 Alabama Amendment 1 =

- November 8, 2022
- Allow Denial of Bail for Offenses Enumerated by State Legislature Amendment

Results
Choice	Votes	%
Yes	1,020,464	80.48%
No	247,554	19.52%
Valid votes	1,268,018	100.00%
Invalid or blank votes	0	0.00%
Total votes	1,268,018	100.00%

Yes
90–100%
80–90%
70–80%
60–70%
50–60%
No
90–100%
80–90%
70–80%
60–70%
50–60%

Alabama Amendment 1, officially the Allow Denial of Bail for Offenses Enumerated by State Legislature Amendment, and commonly referred to as Aniah's Law, is a legislatively referred constitutional amendment that appeared on the ballot in the U.S. state of Alabama on November 8, 2022, concurrent with the 2022 United States elections. The amendment was approved by voters.

== Background ==
The Killing of Aniah Blanchard prompted a statewide response after it was revealed that the suspect had previously been released on bond after being charged with kidnapping, robbery, and attempted murder.

A constitutional amendment to expand the list of felonies for which an individual could be denied bail was first considered as early as 2019. Blanchard's mother also spoke before the Alabama Legislature in support of a potential amendment.

The amendment passed the Alabama House of Representatives unanimously. It then passed the Alabama Senate by a vote of 30–0, officially placing it on the November 2022 ballot.

== Impact ==
The amendment changed the Constitution of Alabama to allow bail to be denied for individuals charged with certain serious felonies.
