= Craig Sorrell Pittman =

American judge

Judge of the Alabama Court of Civil Appeals
- In office 2001 – January 11, 2019

Personal details
- Born: September 6, 1956 (age 69) Enterprise, Alabama
- Party: Republican
- Education: Middlebury College B.A. Cumberland School of Law J.D.

Craig Sorrell Pittman (born September 6, 1956) was a judge of the Alabama Court of Civil Appeals from 2001 until his retirement at the end of his most recent term on January 11, 2019.

== Early life and education ==
Pittman was born on September 6, 1956, in Enterprise, Alabama. He graduated from Middlebury College in Vermont, where he received his Bachelor of Arts degree in Political Science with honors in 1978. In 1981 he was awarded a Juris Doctor degree from the Cumberland School of Law. He was admitted to the practice of law in the State of Alabama in 1981 and in the State of Florida in 1982.

== Legal career ==
After graduating from law school Pittman clerked for Judge Thomas Virgil Pittman of the United States District Court for the Southern District of Alabama from 1981 to 1983. He then practiced law in Mobile with the law firm of Hamilton, Butler, Riddick, Tarlton and Sullivan from 1983 to 1986. In 1986 he started his own firm which eventually became known as Pittman, Pittman, Carwie and Fuquay. He has served as a Deputy Attorney General and General Counsel for the Alabama State Docks.

== Service on Alabama Court of Civil Appeals ==
He was first elected in November 2000. He was re-elected in 2006 and 2012 and retired at the end of his term on January 13, 2019, having not sought re-nomination in the June 2018 primary.

== Personal life ==
Pittman is married to Janet Rich Pittman of Mobile. He has two children.

He is a registered Republican.
