= 2020 Alabama Amendment 1 =

Amendment 1
- Citizen Requirement for Voting Measure

Results
Choice	Votes	%
Yes	1,535,862	77.01%
No	458,487	22.99%
Total votes	1,994,349	100.00%
County results
Yes
80–90%
70–80%
60–70%
50–60%
No
50–60%

2020 Alabama Amendment 1, the Citizen Requirement for Voting Measure, was a legislatively referred constitutional amendment decided on November 3, 2020, as part of the 2020 Alabama elections. The amendment passed with 77.01% of the vote.

== Contents ==
The proposal appeared on the ballot as follows:

Proposing an amendment to the Constitution of Alabama of 1901, to amend Article VIII of the Constitution of Alabama of 1901, now appearing as Section 177 of the Official Recompilation of the Constitution of Alabama of 1901, as amended, to provide that only a citizen of the United States has the right to vote.

== Results ==
Amendment 1
Choice	Votes	%
For	1,535,862	77.01
Against	458,487	22.99
Total	1,994,349	100.00

The amendment was approved with 77.01% of the vote.

== See also ==
- 2020 Florida Amendment 1
