= Terry A. Moore =

American judge

Judge of the Alabama Court of Civil Appeals
- Incumbent
- Assumed office 2007

Personal details
- Born: June 30, 1965 (age 60) Mobile, Alabama
- Party: Republican
- Education: University of South Alabama, B.A. Cumberland School of Law, J.D.

Terry A. Moore (born June 30, 1965) is a Judge of the Alabama Court of Civil Appeals.

== Education ==
Moore was born June 30, 1965, in Mobile, Alabama. He received his Bachelor of Arts from the University of South Alabama in 1990, and his Juris Doctor from the University of Alabama School of Law, graduating magna cum laude in 1993.

== Legal career ==
After law school, Moore practiced law in Mobile, Alabama, with the firm of Adams & Reese where he specialized in workers' compensation and civil litigation. In 1998, he became a partner in the Mobile law firm of Vickers, Riis, Murray & Curran, LLC. Moore co-founded the firm Austill, Lewis, Pipkin & Moore, P.C. in 2004. He left private practice in 2006 when he was elected to the Alabama Court of Civil Appeals.

In 1998, he published a two-volume text called "Alabama Workers' Compensation" that covers the law and many court decisions about it. Moore said his book has been cited in decisions released by the Court of Civil Appeals and the state Supreme Court.

== Service on Alabama Court of Civil Appeals ==
On December 22, 2005, Moore announced that he would run in the Republican primary June 6 for the seat then held by Republican Judge John Crawley, who retired. He was elected to the position in November 2006, and his current term expires on January 13, 2019.

== Personal life ==
Moore is a registered Republican.
