= John Crawley (judge) =

American judge

John Brantley Crawley
- Born: February 28, 1940; Troy, Alabama, U.S.
- Died: June 4, 2013 (aged 73); Montgomery, Alabama, U.S.
- Occupations: Lawyer, judge

John Brantley Crawley (February 28, 1940 – June 4, 2013) was an American jurist and lawyer, based in Alabama.

== Early life and education ==
John Brantley Crawley was born in Troy, Alabama, on February 28, 1940. He grew up with his twin brother Larry, his sister Nancy, and his younger brother William in Pike County. His parents were Wonnie Bowden Crawley and William Douglas Crawley. After a stint in the United States Army, Crawley graduated from the University of Alabama in 1964, and from the University of Alabama School of Law in 1966.

== Career ==
Crawley served as a law clerk on the Court of Appeals of Alabama for Judge George Johnson, and he then served as Assistant Attorney General assigned to the Alabama Department of Revenue. He practiced law with John J. Martin in Dothan and, in 1969, returned to Pike County. While practicing law in Troy, he helped establish Hand-In-Hand, a nonprofit organization working with disabled students. In April 1991, he was appointed Circuit Judge of the 12th Judicial Circuit by Governor Guy Hunt and served until January 1993. He then resumed his law practice until he was elected to the Court of Civil Appeals and took office in January 1995. He was re-elected in November 2000. He retired in 2007.

Judge Crawley served on the Alabama Supreme Court's Task Force on Judicial Elections. He served on the Supreme Court Standing Committee on the Alabama Rules of Juvenile Procedure, the Alabama State Bar Committee on Alternative Methods of Dispute Resolution, and the State Agency ADR Task Force. He was a member of the Judicial Inquiry Commission, having been appointed to that position by the Alabama Supreme Court.

== Publications ==
- "Is The Honeymoon Over for Common-Law Marriage: A Consideration of the Continued Viability of the Common-Law Marriage Doctrine" (Cumberland Law Review)

== Personal life ==
Crawley married Sherrie Johnston; they had a son. Crawley died in 2013, at the age of 73, at a hospital in Montgomery, Alabama.
