= Matt Fridy =

American politician

Judge of the Alabama Court of Civil Appeals
- Incumbent
- Assumed office 2021
- Preceded by: Philip Bahakel

Member of the Alabama House of Representatives from the 73rd district
- In office November 5, 2014 – December 30, 2020
- Preceded by: Joe Hubbard
- Succeeded by: Kenneth Paschal

Personal details
- Born: January 17, 1976 (age 50)
- Party: Republican
- Spouse: Kimberly
- Children: 5
- Education: University of Montevallo; Cumberland School of Law

Matt Fridy (born January 17, 1976) is an American politician and lawyer. He serves as a judge on the Alabama Court of Civil Appeals and served in the Alabama House of Representatives from the 73rd district from 2014 to 2020.

== Education ==
Fridy graduated from the University of Montevallo and received a J.D. degree from the Cumberland School of Law.

== Court of Civil Appeals ==
Fridy was elected to the Alabama Court of Civil Appeals on November 3, 2020, receiving 1,524,104 votes in an uncontested race in the general election. He defeated Judge Philip Bahakel in the March 3, 2020, Republican primary with about 66% of the vote.

== Personal life ==
Fridy suffered a massive heart attack on April 16, 2025. He recovered from the incident and released his first public statement eight days after.
