= Alabama Court of Civil Appeals =

American judicial body

The Alabama Court of Civil Appeals is one of two appellate courts in the Alabama judicial system. The court was established in 1969 when what had been one unitary state Court of Appeals was broken into a criminal appeals court and a civil appeals court. The unified Court of Appeals had been operative since 1911. The initial court's members were appointed by Governor Albert P. Brewer. The court is currently housed in the Alabama Judicial Building in Montgomery, Alabama. Judges on the court are elected in partisan elections on staggered six year terms. Today, the court's membership is all Republican but it was composed of just Democrats between 1969 and 1989. At that time, Republican Governor Guy Hunt appointed Robert J. Russell to the bench on April 16, 1989 thus becoming the first Republican on the court. Ironically, Russell was defeated for re-election in 1990 but was again appointed almost immediately to another vacancy on the court by Governor Hunt in January 1991.

The Court of Civil Appeals hears civil matters, including those related to domestic situations such as divorce, adoptions, child custody, etc. They will rule on cases appealed from certain state administrative agencies, such as worker's compensation. The Court of Civil Appeals also has jurisdiction in civil appeals where the amount in controversy does not exceed $50,000.

The Court of Civil Appeals has jurisdiction of all appeals from administrative agencies in which a judgment was rendered in the circuit court. The court also exercises jurisdiction over appeals in workmen's compensation cases and domestic relations cases, including annulment, divorce, alimony, child support, adoption, and child custody cases.

The Clerk of the Court is Nathan P. Wilson.

== Judges of the court ==
=== Election of judges ===
Judges are elected to the court in statewide partisan elections for six-year terms on the court. However, the Governor may fill vacancies should they occur during a term of office. On November 6, 2012, Judge Tommy Bryan was elected to the Alabama Supreme Court and upon his resignation, Governor Bentley appointed Tuscaloosa Circuit Judge, Scott Donaldson to the seat on January 15, 2013. The other four judges came to their positions through election. By statute, the senior judge of the Civil Appeals Court serves as its Presiding Judge. Terry Moore, who was first elected in 2006, is the current Presiding Judge.

=== Current judges ===
Name	Start	Term Ends	Party	Law School
Terry Moore, Presiding Judge	2006	2031	Republican	Alabama
Christy Edwards	2018	2031	Republican	Faulkner; Alabama (LLM)
Chad Hanson	2018	2031	Republican	Mississippi
Matt Fridy	2020	2027	Republican	Cumberland
Ben Bowden	2025 (Note: Lewis was appointed by Governor Kay Ivey)	2027	Republican	Cumberland

Judge Craig Sorrell Pittman retired at the end of his most recent term and did not seek re-nomination in the June 2018 primary. The seat was won by Christy O. Edwards, who first defeated fellow Republican, Michelle Thomason, the presiding District Judge of Baldwin County in the primary and then went on to win the General Election in November, 2018. Chad Arthur Hanson defeated incumbent Judge Terri Willingham Thomas for re-nomoination and then won that seat in the November election. Judge Donaldson has already announced that he will retire at the end of his current term and therefore, did not seek re-election in 2020. Donaldson's seat was won uncontested in the General Election by Matt Fridy following his primary win. William C. Thompson retired in February 2024 and Bill Lewis was appointed to succeed him.

=== Qualifications ===
To serve on the court, a person must:

- Be licensed to practice law in the state of Alabama and have 10 years practice experience as a lawyer.
- Have resided in the state for a minimum of one year.
- Be no more than 70 years of age at time of appointment or election.

=== Former judges of Court of Civil Appeals ===
- Tommy Bryan (R)
- Glenn Murdock (R)
- Sharon G. Yates (D)-p
- John Crawley (R)-p
- William E. Robertson (D)-p
- Roger M. Monroe (D)
- Charles A. Thigpen (D)
- Robert J. Russell (R)
- Kenneth F. Ingram (D)-p
- Richard L. Holmes (D)-p
- Robert P. Bradley (D)-p
- L. Charles Wright (D)-p
- T. Werth Thagard (D)-p
- Terri Willingham Thomas (R) (2007–2019)
- Craig Sorrell Pittman (R) (2001–2019)
- Scott Donaldson (R) (2013-2021)
- William C. Thompson (R)-p (1997–2024)

p = served as Presiding Judge

== See also ==
- Supreme Court of Alabama
- Alabama Court of Criminal Appeals
