= 2010 Alabama House of Representatives election =

2010 Alabama House of Representatives elections
- November 2, 2010

All 105 seats in the Alabama House of Representatives 53 seats needed for a majority
	Majority party	Minority party
Leader	Mike Hubbard	Craig Ford
Party	Republican	Democratic
Leader's seat	79th-Auburn	28th-Gadsden
Last election	43	62
Seats before	45	60
Seats after	62	43
Seat change	▲17	▼17
Popular vote	735,277	550,644
Percentage	56.0%	42.0%
- Results: Democratic gain Republican gain Democratic hold Republican hold
Speaker before election
Seth Hammett
Democratic
Speaker
Mike Hubbard
Republican

The 2010 Alabama House of Representatives elections were held on November 2, 2010. Voters in all 105 districts of the Alabama House of Representatives voted for their representatives. Other elections were also held on November 2.

After the election, four Democrats switched parties and became Republicans, thereby bringing the Republican majority to 66-39. Two more Democrats would switch (one became an independent and the other became a Republican) over the next four years, which gave Republicans a 67-37-1 majority by the next election.

Republicans won their first House majority since 1873.

== Overview ==
Republicans gained 17 seats, taking control of the chamber, while the Democrats lost 17 seats. After the election, four Democratic representatives switched to the Republican party, increasing the size of their caucus to 66 seats.

Summary of the November 2, 2010 Alabama House of Representatives election results
2010 Alabama State House elections
Party	Votes	Percentage	Before	After	+/–
Republican	735,277	56.0%	45	62	▲17
Democratic	550,644	42.0%	60	43	▼17
Independent	12,674	1.0%	0	0	Steady
Write-In	12,134	0.9%	0	0	Steady
Constitution Party	1,694	0.1%	0	0	Steady
Totals	1,312,423	100.0%	105	105	—

== Predictions ==
Source	Ranking	As of
Governing	Lean R (flip)	November 1, 2010

== Results ==
=== District 1 ===
Alabama's 1st House of Representatives district election, 2010
Party	Candidate	Votes	%
Democratic	Greg Burdine	7,083	50.7
Republican	Quinton Hanson	6,877	49.2
Independent	Write-In	14	0.0
Total votes		13,974	100.0
Democratic hold			

=== District 2 ===
Alabama's 2nd House of Representatives district election, 2010
Party	Candidate	Votes	%
Republican	Lynn Greer	7,599	54.7
Democratic	Mike Curtis (incumbent)	6,284	45.2
Independent	Write-In	15	0.0
Total votes		13,898	100.0
Republican gain from Democratic			

=== District 3 ===
Alabama's 3rd House of Representatives district election, 2010
Party	Candidate	Votes	%
Democratic	Marcel Black (incumbent)	9,076	97.5
Independent	Write-In	228	2.5
Total votes		9,304	100.0
Democratic hold			

=== District 4 ===
Alabama's 4th House of Representatives district election, 2010
Party	Candidate	Votes	%
Republican	Micky Hammon (incumbent)	12,153	69.8
Democratic	Vaughn Goodwin	5,244	30.1
Independent	Write-In	17	0.1
Total votes		17,414	100.0
Republican hold			

=== District 5 ===
Alabama's 5th House of Representatives district election, 2010
Party	Candidate	Votes	%
Republican	Dan Williams	8,807	56.5
Democratic	Henry A. White (incumbent)	5,402	34.7
Independent	Jerry Hill	1,359	8.7
Independent	Write-In	8	0.1
Total votes		15,576	100.0
Republican gain from Democratic			

=== District 6 ===
Alabama's 6th House of Representatives district election, 2010
Party	Candidate	Votes	%
Republican	Phil Williams	9,880	97.0
Independent	Write-In	308	3.0
Total votes		10,188	100.0
Republican hold			

=== District 7 ===
Alabama's 7th House of Representatives district election, 2010
Party	Candidate	Votes	%
Republican	Ken Johnson	7,096	50.62
Democratic	John "Jody" Letson (incumbent)	6,911	49.3
Independent	Write-In	11	.08
Total votes		14,018	100.0
Republican gain from Democratic			

=== District 8 ===
Alabama's 8th House of Representatives district election, 2010
Party	Candidate	Votes	%
Republican	Terri Collins	6,574	56.0
Democratic	Drama Breland	5,147	43.9
Independent	Write-In	15	0.1
Total votes		11,736	100.0
Republican gain from Democratic			

=== District 9 ===
Alabama's 9th House of Representatives district election, 2010
Party	Candidate	Votes	%
Republican	Ed Henry	11,405	72.6
Democratic	Kathy White Goodwin	4,294	27.3
Independent	Write-In	7	0.1
Total votes		15,706	100.0
Republican gain from Democratic			

=== District 10 ===
Alabama's 10th House of Representatives district election, 2010
Party	Candidate	Votes	%
Republican	Mike Ball (incumbent)	11,950	98.4
Independent	Write-In	192	1.6
Total votes		12,142	100.0
Republican hold			

=== District 11 ===
Alabama's 11th House of Representatives district election, 2010
Party	Candidate	Votes	%
Republican	Jeremy Oden (incumbent)	12,977	98.9
Independent	Write-In	139	1.1
Total votes		13,116	100.0
Republican hold			

=== District 12 ===
Alabama's 12th House of Representatives district election, 2010
Party	Candidate	Votes	%
Republican	Mac Buttram	9,062	54.1
Democratic	James C. Fields (incumbent)	7,667	45.8
Independent	Write-In	20	0.1
Total votes		16,749	100.0
Republican gain from Democratic			

=== District 13 ===
Alabama's 13th State House of Representatives district election, 2010
Party	Candidate	Votes	%
Republican	Bill Roberts	7,990	60.6
Democratic	Tommy Sherer (incumbent)	5,186	39.3
Independent	Write-In	12	0.1
Total votes		13,188	100.0
Republican gain from Democratic			

=== District 14 ===
Alabama's 14th State House of Representatives district election, 2010
Party	Candidate	Votes	%
Republican	Richard Baughn	9,327	69.2
Democratic	Ken Guin (incumbent)	4,121	30.6
Independent	Write-In	30	0.2
Total votes		13,478	100.0
Republican gain from Democratic			

=== District 15 ===
Alabama's 15th State House of Representatives district election, 2010
Party	Candidate	Votes	%
Republican	Allen Farley	14,117	99.1
Independent	Write-In	135	0.9
Total votes		14,252	100.0
Republican hold			

=== District 16 ===
Alabama's 16th State House of Representatives district election, 2010
Party	Candidate	Votes	%
Republican	Daniel Boman	7,451	53.8
Democratic	William E. Thigpen Sr. (incumbent)	6,379	46.1
Independent	Write-In	8	0.1
Total votes		13,838	100.0
Republican gain from Democratic			

=== District 17 ===
Alabama's 17th State House of Representatives district election, 2010
Party	Candidate	Votes	%
Democratic	Mike Millican (incumbent)	8,107	96.7
Independent	Write-In	276	3.3
Total votes		8,383	100.0
Democratic hold			

=== District 18 ===
Alabama's 18th State House of Representatives district election, 2010
Party	Candidate	Votes	%
Democratic	Johnny Mack Morrow (incumbent)	8,344	97.4
Independent	Write-In	227	2.6
Total votes		8,571	100.0
Democratic hold			

=== District 19 ===
Alabama's 19th State House of Representatives district election, 2010
Party	Candidate	Votes	%
Democratic	Laura Hall (incumbent)	10,669	97.4
Independent	Write-In	99	0.9
Total votes		10,768	100.0
Democratic hold			

=== District 20 ===
Alabama's 20th State House of Representatives district election, 2010
Party	Candidate	Votes	%
Republican	Howard Sanderford (incumbent)	17,733	98.8
Independent	Write-In	212	1.2
Total votes		17,945	100.0
Republican hold			

=== District 21 ===
Alabama's 21st State House of Representatives district election, 2010
Party	Candidate	Votes	%
Republican	Jim Patterson	6,654	51.7
Democratic	Randy Hinshaw (incumbent)	6,201	48.2
Independent	Write-In	17	0.1
Total votes		12,872	100.0
Republican gain from Democratic			

=== District 22 ===
Alabama's 22nd State House of Representatives district election, 2010
Party	Candidate	Votes	%
Republican	Wayne Johnson	9,523	64.7
Democratic	Butch Taylor	5,177	35.2
Independent	Write-In	18	0.1
Total votes		14,718	100.0
Republican gain from Democratic			

=== District 23 ===
Alabama's 23rd State House of Representatives district election, 2010
Party	Candidate	Votes	%
Democratic	John Robinson (incumbent)	7,782	90.0
Independent	Write-In	860	10.0
Total votes		8,642	100.0
Democratic hold			

=== District 24 ===
Alabama's 24th State House of Representatives district election, 2010
Party	Candidate	Votes	%
Republican	Todd Greeson (incumbent)	7,967	53.3
Democratic	Nathaniel Ledbetter	6,971	46.7
Total votes		14,938	100.0
Republican hold			

=== District 25 ===
Alabama's 25th State House of Representatives district election, 2010
Party	Candidate	Votes	%
Republican	Mac McCutcheon (incumbent)	17,822	98.3
Independent	Write-In	307	1.7
Total votes		18,129	100.0
Republican hold			

=== District 26 ===
Alabama's 26th State House of Representatives district election, 2010
Party	Candidate	Votes	%
Republican	Kerry Rich	7,203	59.5
Democratic	Randall White	4,873	40.3
Independent	Write-In	23	0.2
Total votes		12,099	100.0
Republican gain from Democratic			

=== District 27 ===
Alabama's 27th State House of Representatives district election, 2010
Party	Candidate	Votes	%
Republican	Wes Long	8,238	53.2
Democratic	Jeff McLaughlin (incumbent)	7,225	46.7
Independent	Write-In	19	0.2
Total votes		15,482	100.0
Republican gain from Democratic			

=== District 28 ===
Alabama's 28th State House of Representatives district election, 2010
Party	Candidate	Votes	%
Democratic	Craig Ford (incumbent)	8,208	96.8
Independent	Write-In	268	3.2
Total votes		8,476	100.0
Democratic hold			

=== District 29 ===
Alabama's 29th State House of Representatives district election, 2010
Party	Candidate	Votes	%
Republican	Becky Nordgren	5,845	51.9
Democratic	Jack Page (incumbent)	5,406	48.0
Independent	Write-In	7	0.1
Total votes		11,258	100.0
Republican gain from Democratic			

=== District 30 ===
Alabama's 30th State House of Representatives district election, 2010
Party	Candidate	Votes	%
Republican	Blaine Galliher (incumbent)	10,979	72.4
Democratic	Wally Burns	4,153	27.4
Independent	Write-In	24	0.2
Total votes		15,156	100.0
Republican hold			

=== District 31 ===
Alabama's 31st State House of Representatives district election, 2010
Party	Candidate	Votes	%
Republican	Barry Mask (incumbent)	13,104	98.4
Independent	Write-In	219	1.6
Total votes		13,323	100.0
Republican hold			

=== District 32 ===
Alabama's 32nd State House of Representatives district election, 2010
Party	Candidate	Votes	%
Democratic	Barbara Bigsby-Boyd (incumbent)	7,240	71.3
Republican	Ron Struzik	2,905	28.6
Independent	Write-In	11	0.1
Total votes		10,156	100.0
Democratic hold			

=== District 33 ===
Alabama's 33rd State House of Representatives district election, 2010
Party	Candidate	Votes	%
Republican	Ron Johnson (incumbent)	9,567	98.2
Independent	Write-In	180	1.8
Total votes		9,747	100.0
Republican hold			

=== District 34 ===
Alabama's 34th State House of Representatives district election, 2010
Party	Candidate	Votes	%
Republican	Elwyn Thomas (incumbent)	13,515	99.1
Independent	Write-In	123	0.9
Total votes		13,638	100.0
Republican hold			

=== District 35 ===
Alabama's 35th State House of Representatives district election, 2010
Party	Candidate	Votes	%
Democratic	Steve Hurst (incumbent)	6,722	51.6
Republican	Steven M. Dean	6,295	48.3
Independent	Write-In	15	0.1
Total votes		13,032	100.0
Democratic hold			

=== District 36 ===
Alabama's 36th State House of Representatives district election, 2010
Party	Candidate	Votes	%
Republican	Randy Wood (incumbent)	10,612	76.1
Democratic	Garry Bearden	3,301	23.7
Independent	Write-In	26	0.2
Total votes		13,939	100.0
Republican hold			

=== District 37 ===
Alabama's 37th State House of Representatives district election, 2010
Party	Candidate	Votes	%
Democratic	Richard Laird (incumbent)	8,106	53.6
Republican	Bob Fincher	7,011	46.3
Independent	Write-In	14	0.1
Total votes		15,131	100.0
Democratic hold			

=== District 38 ===
Alabama's 38th State House of Representatives district election, 2010
Party	Candidate	Votes	%
Republican	DuWayne Bridges (incumbent)	5,980	50.8
Democratic	Huey P. Long	5,748	48.8
Independent	Write-In	30	0.2
Total votes		11,768	100.0
Republican hold			

=== District 39 ===
Alabama's 39th State House of Representatives district election, 2010
Party	Candidate	Votes	%
Democratic	Richard Lindsey (incumbent)	7,808	57.0
Republican	Tim Sprayberry	5,872	42.9
Independent	Write-In	14	0.1
Total votes		13,964	100.0
Democratic hold			

=== District 40 ===
Alabama's 40th State House of Representatives district election, 2010
Party	Candidate	Votes	%
Republican	K. L. (Koven) Brown	8,587	62.4
Democratic	Ricky Whaley	5,148	37.4
Independent	Write-In	24	0.2
Total votes		13,759	100.0
Republican gain from Democratic			

=== District 41 ===
Alabama's 41st State House of Representatives district election, 2010
Party	Candidate	Votes	%
Republican	Mike Hill (incumbent)	19,319	99.1
Independent	Write-In	169	0.9
Total votes		19,588	100.0
Republican hold			

=== District 42 ===
Alabama's 42nd State House of Representatives district election, 2010
Party	Candidate	Votes	%
Republican	Kurt Wallace	9,382	63.2
Democratic	James M. "Jimmy" Martin (incumbent)	5,452	36.7
Independent	Write-In	9	0.1
Total votes		14,843	100.0
Republican gain from Democratic			

=== District 43 ===
Alabama's 43rd State House of Representatives district election, 2010
Party	Candidate	Votes	%
Republican	Mary Sue McClurkin (incumbent)	16,368	80.1
Democratic	Virginia Sweet	4,041	19.8
Independent	Write-In	29	0.1
Total votes		20,438	100.0
Republican hold			

=== District 44 ===
Alabama's 44th State House of Representatives district election, 2010
Party	Candidate	Votes	%
Republican	Arthur Payne (incumbent)	11,654	97.8
Independent	Write-In	267	2.2
Total votes		11,921	100.0
Republican hold			

=== District 45 ===
Alabama's 45th State House of Representatives district election, 2010
Party	Candidate	Votes	%
Republican	Owen Drake (incumbent)	8,165	61.5
Democratic	Charlene Cannon	5,103	38.4
Independent	Write-In	10	0.1
Total votes		13,278	100.0
Republican gain from Democratic			

=== District 46 ===
Alabama's 46th State House of Representatives district election, 2010
Party	Candidate	Votes	%
Republican	Paul DeMarco (incumbent)	15,446	98.9
Independent	Write-In	165	1.1
Total votes		15,611	100.0
Republican hold			

=== District 47 ===
Alabama's 47th State House of Representatives district election, 2010
Party	Candidate	Votes	%
Republican	Jack Williams (incumbent)	8,735	61.0
Independent	Charles "Chip" McCallum	5,527	38.6
Independent	Write-In	51	0.4
Total votes		14,313	100.0
Republican hold			

=== District 48 ===
Alabama's 48th State House of Representatives district election, 2010
Party	Candidate	Votes	%
Republican	Greg Canfield (incumbent)	16,859	99.0
Independent	Write-In	169	1.0
Total votes		17,028	100.0
Republican hold			

=== District 49 ===
Alabama's 49th State House of Representatives district election, 2010
Party	Candidate	Votes	%
Republican	April Weaver	12,411	99.0
Independent	Write-In	127	1.0
Total votes		12,538	100.0
Republican hold			

=== District 50 ===
Alabama's 50th State House of Representatives district election, 2010
Party	Candidate	Votes	%
Republican	Jim McClendon (incumbent)	14,248	99.0
Independent	Write-In	143	1.0
Total votes		14,391	100.0
Republican hold			

=== District 51 ===
Alabama's 51st State House of Representatives district election, 2010
Party	Candidate	Votes	%
Republican	Allen Treadaway (incumbent)	14,061	99.0
Independent	Write-In	149	1.0
Total votes		14,210	100.0
Republican hold			

=== District 52 ===
Alabama's 52nd State House of Representatives district election, 2010
Party	Candidate	Votes	%
Democratic	John Rogers (incumbent)	9,599	97.5
Independent	Write-In	242	2.5
Total votes		9,841	100.0
Democratic hold			

=== District 53 ===
Alabama's 53rd State House of Representatives district election, 2010
Party	Candidate	Votes	%
Democratic	Demetrius Newton (incumbent)	7,729	98.9
Independent	Write-In	87	1.1
Total votes		7,816	100.0
Democratic hold			

=== District 54 ===
Alabama's 54th State House of Representatives district election, 2010
Party	Candidate	Votes	%
Democratic	Patricia Todd (incumbent)	7,599	98.7
Independent	Write-In	97	1.3
Total votes		7,696	100.0
Democratic hold			

=== District 55 ===
Alabama's 55th State House of Representatives district election, 2010
Party	Candidate	Votes	%
Democratic	Rod Scott (incumbent)	8,670	99.1
Independent	Write-In	80	0.9
Total votes		8,750	100.0
Democratic hold			

=== District 56 ===
Alabama's 56th State House of Representatives district election, 2010
Party	Candidate	Votes	%
Democratic	Lawrence McAdory (incumbent)	9,881	98.4
Independent	Write-In	160	1.6
Total votes		10,041	100.0
Democratic hold			

=== District 57 ===
Alabama's 57th State House of Representatives district election, 2010
Party	Candidate	Votes	%
Democratic	Merika Coleman (incumbent)	10,676	98.7
Independent	Write-In	140	1.3
Total votes		10,816	100.0
Democratic hold			

=== District 58 ===
Alabama's 58th State House of Representatives district election, 2010
Party	Candidate	Votes	%
Democratic	Oliver Robinson (incumbent)	9,704	99.2
Independent	Write-In	74	0.8
Total votes		9,778	100.0
Democratic hold			

=== District 59 ===
Alabama's 59th State House of Representatives district election, 2010
Party	Candidate	Votes	%
Democratic	Mary Moore (incumbent)	7,521	98.7
Independent	Write-In	101	1.3
Total votes		7,622	100.0
Democratic hold			

=== District 60 ===
Alabama's 60th State House of Representatives district election, 2010
Party	Candidate	Votes	%
Democratic	Juandalynn "Lee Lee" Givan	10,383	98.8
Independent	Write-In	127	1.2
Total votes		10,510	100.0
Democratic hold			

=== District 61 ===
Alabama's 61st State House of Representatives district election, 2010
Party	Candidate	Votes	%
Democratic	Alan Harper (incumbent)	11,102	77.8
Republican	Frank Chandler	3,167	22.2
Independent	Write-In	4	0.0
Total votes		14,273	100.0
Democratic hold			

=== District 62 ===
Alabama's 62nd State House of Representatives district election, 2010
Party	Candidate	Votes	%
Republican	John Merrill	11,658	86.7
Constitution	Steven Kneussle	1,694	12.6
Independent	Write-In	100	0.7
Total votes		13,452	100.0
Republican hold			

=== District 63 ===
Alabama's 63rd State House of Representatives district election, 2010
Party	Candidate	Votes	%
Republican	Bill Poole	9,937	63.8
Democratic	Susan Pace Hamill	5,631	36.1
Independent	Write-In	14	0.1
Total votes		15,582	100.0
Republican hold			

=== District 64 ===
Alabama's 64th State House of Representatives district election, 2010
Party	Candidate	Votes	%
Republican	Harry Shiver (incumbent)	8,524	98.5
Independent	Write-In	128	1.5
Total votes		8,652	100.0
Republican hold			

=== District 65 ===
Alabama's 65th State House of Representatives district election, 2010
Party	Candidate	Votes	%
Democratic	Elaine Beech	11,727	85.8
Independent	Ozelle Hubert	1,920	14.0
Independent	Write-In	25	0.2
Total votes		13,692	100.0
Democratic hold			

=== District 66 ===
Alabama's 66th State House of Representatives district election, 2010
Party	Candidate	Votes	%
Republican	Alan Baker (incumbent)	8,615	98.9
Independent	Write-In	98	1.1
Total votes		8,713	100.0
Republican hold			

=== District 67 ===
Alabama's 67th State House of Representatives district election, 2010
Party	Candidate	Votes	%
Democratic	Dario Melton	10,382	98.5
Independent	Write-In	156	1.5
Total votes		10,538	100.0
Democratic hold			

=== District 68 ===
Alabama's 68th State House of Representatives district election, 2010
Party	Candidate	Votes	%
Democratic	Thomas E. (Action) Jackson (incumbent)	10,471	98.9
Independent	Write-In	113	1.1
Total votes		10,584	100.0
Democratic hold			

=== District 69 ===
Alabama's 69th State House of Representatives district election, 2010
Party	Candidate	Votes	%
Democratic	David Colston	11,058	98.6
Independent	Write-In	157	1.4
Total votes		11,215	100.0
Democratic hold			

=== District 70 ===
Alabama's 70th State House of Representatives district election, 2010
Party	Candidate	Votes	%
Democratic	Christopher John England (incumbent)	7,611	99.1
Independent	Write-In	70	0.9
Total votes		7,681	100.0
Democratic hold			

=== District 71 ===
Alabama's 71st State House of Representatives district election, 2010
Party	Candidate	Votes	%
Democratic	Artis "A. J." McCampbell (incumbent)	12,261	99.2
Independent	Write-In	100	0.8
Total votes		12,361	100.0
Democratic hold			

=== District 72 ===
Alabama's 72nd State House of Representatives district election, 2010
Party	Candidate	Votes	%
Democratic	Ralph A. Howard (incumbent)	11,552	98.8
Independent	Write-In	143	1.2
Total votes		11,695	100.0
Democratic hold			

=== District 73 ===
Alabama's 73rd State House of Representatives district election, 2010
Party	Candidate	Votes	%
Democratic	Joseph Lister "Joe" Hubbard	8,137	50.9
Republican	David Grimes (incumbent)	7,825	49.0
Independent	Write-In	15	0.1
Total votes		15,977	100.0
Democratic gain from Republican			

=== District 74 ===
Alabama's 74th State House of Representatives district election, 2010
Party	Candidate	Votes	%
Republican	Jay Love (incumbent)	8,714	76.9
Independent	Jay King	2,562	22.6
Independent	Write-In	54	0.5
Total votes		11,330	100.0
Republican hold			

=== District 75 ===
Alabama's 75th State House of Representatives district election, 2010
Party	Candidate	Votes	%
Republican	Greg Wren (incumbent)	14,046	71.6
Democratic	Glenn L. Allen	5,551	28.3
Independent	Write-In	23	0.1
Total votes		19,620	100.0
Republican hold			

=== District 76 ===
Alabama's 76th State House of Representatives district election, 2010
Party	Candidate	Votes	%
Democratic	Thad McClammy (incumbent)	10,092	98.0
Independent	Write-In	210	2.0
Total votes		10,302	100.0
Democratic hold			

=== District 77 ===
Alabama's 77th State House of Representatives district election, 2010
Party	Candidate	Votes	%
Democratic	John Knight (incumbent)	8,353	98.3
Independent	Write-In	145	1.7
Total votes		8,498	100.0
Democratic hold			

=== District 78 ===
Alabama's 78th State House of Representatives district election, 2010
Party	Candidate	Votes	%
Democratic	Alvin Holmes (incumbent)	7,349	81.2
Independent	Ken Guin	1,313	14.5
Independent	Write-In	389	4.3
Total votes		9,041	100.0
Democratic hold			

=== District 79 ===
Alabama's 79th State House of Representatives district election, 2010
Party	Candidate	Votes	%
Republican	Mike Hubbard (incumbent)	11,128	97.3
Independent	Write-In	311	2.7
Total votes		11,439	100.0
Republican hold			

=== District 80 ===
Alabama's 80th State House of Representatives district election, 2010
Party	Candidate	Votes	%
Democratic	Lesley Vance (incumbent)	5,579	54.6
Republican	Mervin Dudley	4,626	45.3
Independent	Write-In	16	0.2
Total votes		10,211	100.0
Democratic hold			

=== District 81 ===
Alabama's 81st State House of Representatives district election, 2010
Party	Candidate	Votes	%
Republican	Mark M. Tuggle	9,268	55.9
Democratic	Betty Carol Graham (incumbent)	7,306	44.1
Independent	Write-In	4	0.0
Total votes		16,578	100.0
Republican gain from Democratic			

=== District 82 ===
Alabama's 82nd State House of Representatives district election, 2010
Party	Candidate	Votes	%
Democratic	Pebblin W. Warren (incumbent)	10,180	98.0
Independent	Write-In	209	2.0
Total votes		10,389	100.0
Democratic hold			

=== District 83 ===
Alabama's 83rd State House of Representatives district election, 2010
Party	Candidate	Votes	%
Democratic	George "Tootie" Bandy (incumbent)	7,484	96.9
Independent	Write-In	237	3.1
Total votes		7,721	100.0
Democratic hold			

=== District 84 ===
Alabama's 84th State House of Representatives district election, 2010
Party	Candidate	Votes	%
Democratic	Berry Forte	7,764	65.1
Republican	Joyce L. Perrin	4,152	34.8
Independent	Write-In	12	0.1
Total votes		11,928	100.0
Democratic hold			

=== District 85 ===
Alabama's 85th State House of Representatives district election, 2010
Party	Candidate	Votes	%
Democratic	Dexter Grimsley	6,692	51.6
Republican	Jody Singleton	6,255	48.2
Independent	Write-In	23	0.2
Total votes		12,970	100.0
Democratic hold			

=== District 86 ===
Alabama's 86th State House of Representatives district election, 2010
Party	Candidate	Votes	%
Republican	Paul Lee	9,159	58.0
Democratic	Merritt Carothers	6,623	41.9
Independent	Write-In	20	0.1
Total votes		15,802	100.0
Republican hold			

=== District 87 ===
Alabama's 87th State House of Representatives district election, 2010
Party	Candidate	Votes	%
Republican	Donnie Chesteen	14,347	99.0
Independent	Write-In	146	1.0
Total votes		14,493	100.0
Republican hold			

=== District 88 ===
Alabama's 88th State House of Representatives district election, 2010
Party	Candidate	Votes	%
Republican	Paul Beckman	14,382	98.4
Independent	Write-In	229	1.6
Total votes		14,611	100.0
Republican hold			

=== District 89 ===
Alabama's 89th State House of Representatives district election, 2010
Party	Candidate	Votes	%
Democratic	Alan C. Boothe (incumbent)	7,912	97.7
Independent	Write-In	186	2.3
Total votes		8,098	100.0
Democratic hold			

=== District 90 ===
Alabama's 90th State House of Representatives district election, 2010
Party	Candidate	Votes	%
Democratic	Charles Newton (incumbent)	8,577	59.4
Republican	Jerry Hartin	5,855	40.5
Independent	Write-In	14	0.1
Total votes		14,446	100.0
Democratic hold			

=== District 91 ===
Alabama's 91st State House of Representatives district election, 2010
Party	Candidate	Votes	%
Republican	Barry Moore	9,754	64.3
Democratic	Terry Spicer (incumbent)	5,383	35.5
Independent	Write-In	30	0.2
Total votes		15,167	100.0
Republican gain from Democratic			

=== District 92 ===
Alabama's 92nd State House of Representatives district election, 2010
Party	Candidate	Votes	%
Republican	Mike Jones Jr.	6,820	52.1
Independent	Don Cotton	3,180	24.3
Democratic	David S. Darby	3,086	23.6
Independent	Write-In	13	0.1
Total votes		13,099	100.0
Republican gain from Democratic			

=== District 93 ===
Alabama's 93rd State House of Representatives district election, 2010
Party	Candidate	Votes	%
Republican	Steve Clouse (incumbent)	11,418	77.5
Democratic	Ronnie Helms	3,271	22.2
Independent	Write-In	36	0.3
Total votes		14,275	100.0
Republican hold			

=== District 94 ===
Alabama's 94th State House of Representatives district election, 2010
Party	Candidate	Votes	%
Republican	Joe Faust (incumbent)	16,481	98.9
Independent	Write-In	178	1.1
Total votes		16,659	100.0
Republican hold			

=== District 95 ===
Alabama's 95th State House of Representatives district election, 2010
Party	Candidate	Votes	%
Republican	Steve McMillan (incumbent)	16,239	99.0
Independent	Write-In	156	1.0
Total votes		16,395	100.0
Republican hold			

=== District 96 ===
Alabama's 96th State House of Representatives district election, 2010
Party	Candidate	Votes	%
Republican	Randy Davis (incumbent)	13,319	98.8
Independent	Write-In	157	1.2
Total votes		13,476	100.0
Republican hold			

=== District 97 ===
Alabama's 97th State House of Representatives district election, 2010
Party	Candidate	Votes	%
Democratic	Yvonne Kennedy (incumbent)	6,714	97.1
Independent	Write-In	200	2.9
Total votes		6,914	100.0
Democratic hold			

=== District 98 ===
Alabama's 98th State House of Representatives district election, 2010
Party	Candidate	Votes	%
Democratic	Napoleon Bracy Jr.	6,767	60.6
Republican	Sharon L. Powe	3,222	28.9
Independent	Write-In	1,177	10.5
Total votes		11,166	100.0
Democratic hold			

=== District 99 ===
Alabama's 99th State House of Representatives district election, 2010
Party	Candidate	Votes	%
Democratic	James E. Buskey (incumbent)	8,554	82.3
Independent	Rashawn Figures	1,800	17.3
Independent	Write-In	45	0.4
Total votes		10,399	100.0
Democratic hold			

=== District 100 ===
Alabama's 100th State House of Representatives district election, 2010
Party	Candidate	Votes	%
Republican	Victor Gaston (incumbent)	12,640	98.8
Independent	Write-In	154	1.2
Total votes		12,794	100.0
Republican hold			

=== District 101 ===
Alabama's 101st State House of Representatives district election, 2010
Party	Candidate	Votes	%
Republican	Jamie Ison (incumbent)	8,414	98.2
Independent	Write-In	155	1.8
Total votes		8,569	100.0
Republican hold			

=== District 102 ===
Alabama's 102nd State House of Representatives district election, 2010
Party	Candidate	Votes	%
Republican	Chad Fincher (incumbent)	9,641	99.0
Independent	Write-In	99	1.0
Total votes		9,740	100.0
Republican hold			

=== District 103 ===
Alabama's 103rd State House of Representatives district election, 2010
Party	Candidate	Votes	%
Democratic	Joseph C. Mitchell (incumbent)	6,962	98.9
Independent	Write-In	75	1.1
Total votes		7,037	100.0
Democratic hold			

=== District 104 ===
Alabama's 104th State House of Representatives district election, 2010
Party	Candidate	Votes	%
Republican	Jim Barton (incumbent)	11,155	98.7
Independent	Write-In	144	1.3
Total votes		11,299	100.0
Republican hold			

=== District 105 ===
Alabama's 105th State House of Representatives district election, 2010
Party	Candidate	Votes	%
Republican	Spencer Collier (incumbent)	7,807	98.3
Independent	Write-In	135	1.7
Total votes		7,942	100.0
Republican hold			

== See also ==
- List of Alabama state legislatures
