= 2014 Alabama House of Representatives election =

2014 Alabama House of Representatives elections
- November 4, 2014

All 105 seats in the Alabama House of Representatives 53 seats needed for a majority
	Majority party	Minority party
Leader	Mike Hubbard	Craig Ford
Party	Republican	Democratic
Leader's seat	79th-Auburn	28th-Gadsden
Last election	62	43
Seats before	67+1 (Note: Independent Richard Laird from House District 37 caucused with Republicans.)	37
Seats after	72	33
Seat change	▲4	▼4
- Results: Republican gain Democratic hold Republican hold
Speaker before election
Mike Hubbard
Republican
Speaker
Mike Hubbard
Republican

The 2014 Alabama House of Representatives elections were held on November 4, 2014. Voters in all 105 districts of the Alabama House of Representatives voted for their representatives. Other elections were also held on November 4.

== Overview ==
Before the election, Republicans already held a 66–37 majority over the Democrats with one independent siding with the GOP and one seat was vacant. After the election, Republicans obtained a supermajority with a margin of 72–33.

Summary of the November 4, 2014 Alabama House of Representatives election results
2014 Alabama State House elections
Party	Votes	Percentage	Before	After	+/–
Republican	n/a	n/a	66	72	▲6
Democratic	n/a	n/a	37	33	▼4
Independent	n/a	n/a	1	0	▼1
Write-In	n/a	n/a	0	0	Steady
Constitution Party	n/a	n/a	0	0	Steady
Totals	n/a	100.0%	105	105	—

== Predictions ==
Source	Ranking	As of
Governing	Safe R	October 20, 2014

== Close races ==
Seats where the margin of victory was under 10%:

1. District 7, 1.32%

2. District 38, 2%

3. District 1, 2.9% (gain)

4. District 35, 3.3%

5. District 85, 3.4%

6. District 21, 3.5% (gain)

7. District 29, 3.9% (gain)

8. District 24, 6.3%

9. District 27, 6.5%

10. District 37, 7.3%

11. District 12, 8.3%

12. District 80, 9.3%

== Results ==
=== District 1 ===
Alabama's 1st House of Representatives district election, 2014
Party	Candidate	Votes	%
Republican	Phillip Pettus	4,933	51.4
Democratic	Greg Burdine (incumbent)	4,652	48.5
Independent	Write-In	10	0.1
Total votes		9,595	100.0
Republican gain from Democratic			

=== District 2 ===
Alabama's 2nd House of Representatives district election, 2014
Party	Candidate	Votes	%
Republican	Lynn Greer (incumbent)	8,561	62.1
Democratic	Andy Betterton	5,224	37.8
Independent	Write-In	11	0.1
Total votes		13,796	100.0
Republican hold			

=== District 3 ===
Alabama's 3rd House of Representatives district election, 2014
Party	Candidate	Votes	%
Democratic	Marcel Black (incumbent)	7,993	59.8
Republican	Fred Joly	5,357	40.1
Independent	Write-In	8	0.1
Total votes		13,358	100.0
Democratic hold			

=== District 4 ===
Alabama's 4th House of Representatives district election, 2014
Party	Candidate	Votes	%
Republican	Micky Hammon (incumbent)	8,473	98.35
Independent	Write-In	142	1.65
Total votes		8,615	100.0
Republican hold			

=== District 5 ===
Alabama's 5th House of Representatives district election, 2014
Party	Candidate	Votes	%
Republican	Dan Williams (incumbent)	8,807	56.24
Democratic	Henry A. White	5,520	43.56
Independent	Write-In	30	0.2
Total votes		15,576	100.0
Republican hold			

=== District 6 ===
Alabama's 6th House of Representatives district election, 2014
Party	Candidate	Votes	%
Republican	Phil Williams	8,323	97.2
Independent	Write-In	237	2.8
Total votes		8,560	100.0
Republican hold			

=== District 7 ===
Alabama's 7th House of Representatives district election, 2014
Party	Candidate	Votes	%
Republican	Ken Johnson (incumbent)	7,096	50.62
Democratic	Jody Letson	6,911	49.3
Independent	Write-In	11	.08
Total votes		14,018	100.0
Republican hold			

=== District 8 ===
Alabama's 8th House of Representatives district election, 2014
Party	Candidate	Votes	%
Republican	Terri Collins	6,574	56.0
Democratic	Drama Breland	5,147	43.9
Independent	Write-In	15	0.1
Total votes		11,736	100.0
Republican hold			

=== District 9 ===
Alabama's 9th House of Representatives district election, 2014
Party	Candidate	Votes	%
Republican	Ed Henry	11,405	72.6
Democratic	Kathy White Goodwin	4,294	27.3
Independent	Write-In	7	0.1
Total votes		15,706	100.0
Republican hold			

=== District 10 ===
Alabama's 10th House of Representatives district election, 2014
Party	Candidate	Votes	%
Republican	Mike Ball (incumbent)	11,950	98.4
Independent	Write-In	192	1.6
Total votes		12,142	100.0
Republican hold			

=== District 11 ===
Alabama's 11th House of Representatives district election, 2014
Party	Candidate	Votes	%
Republican	Jeremy H. Oden (incumbent)	12,977	98.9
Independent	Write-In	139	1.1
Total votes		13,116	100.0
Republican hold			

=== District 12 ===
Alabama's 12th House of Representatives district election, 2014
Party	Candidate	Votes	%
Republican	Mac Buttram	9,062	54.1
Democratic	James C. Fields Jr.	7,667	45.8
Independent	Write-In	20	0.1
Total votes		16,749	100.0
Republican hold			

=== District 13 ===
Alabama's 13th House of Representatives district election, 2014
Party	Candidate	Votes	%
Republican	Connie Rowe	9,455	98.1
Independent	Write-In	180	1.9
Total votes		9,662	100.0
Republican hold			

=== District 14 ===
Alabama's 14th House of Representatives district election, 2014
Party	Candidate	Votes	%
Republican	Richard Baughn	9,255	98.6
Independent	Write-In	134	1.4
Total votes		9,389	100.0
Republican hold			

=== District 15 ===
Alabama's 15th House of Representatives district election, 2014
Party	Candidate	Votes	%
Republican	Allen Farley	14,117	99.1
Independent	Write-In	135	0.9
Total votes		14,252	100.0
Republican hold			

=== District 16 ===
Alabama's 16th House of Representatives district election, 2014
Party	Candidate	Votes	%
Republican	Kyle South	10,467	75.3
Democratic	Daniel Boman (incumbent)	3,430	24.7
Independent	Write-In	11	0.0
Total votes		13,908	100.0
Republican gain from Democratic			

=== District 17 ===
Alabama's 17th House of Representatives district election, 2014
Party	Candidate	Votes	%
Democratic	Mike Millican (incumbent)	8,107	96.7
Independent	Write-In	276	3.3
Total votes		8,383	100.0
Democratic hold			

=== District 18 ===
Alabama's 18th House of Representatives district election, 2014
Party	Candidate	Votes	%
Democratic	Johnny Mack Morrow (incumbent)	8,344	97.4
Independent	Write-In	227	2.6
Total votes		8,571	100.0
Democratic hold			

=== District 19 ===
Alabama's 19th House of Representatives district election, 2014
Party	Candidate	Votes	%
Democratic	Laura Hall (incumbent)	7,615	82.88
Independent	A.J. Smith	1,557	16.95
Independent	Write-In	16	0.17
Total votes		9,188	100.0
Democratic hold			

=== District 20 ===
Alabama's 20th House of Representatives district election, 2014
Party	Candidate	Votes	%
Republican	Howard Sanderford (incumbent)	17,733	98.8
Independent	Write-In	212	1.2
Total votes		17,945	100.0
Republican hold			

=== District 21 ===
Alabama's 21st House of Representatives district election, 2014
Party	Candidate	Votes	%
Republican	Jim Patterson	6,654	51.7
Democratic	Randy Hinshaw (incumbent)	6,201	48.2
Independent	Write-In	17	0.1
Total votes		12,872	100.0
Republican gain from Democratic			

=== District 22 ===
Alabama's 22nd House of Representatives district election, 2014
Party	Candidate	Votes	%
Republican	Wayne Johnson	9,523	64.7
Democratic	Butch Taylor	5,177	35.2
Independent	Write-In	18	0.1
Total votes		14,718	100.0
Republican hold			

=== District 23 ===
Alabama's 23rd House of Representatives district election, 2014
Party	Candidate	Votes	%
Democratic	John Robinson (incumbent)	7,782	90.0
Independent	Write-In	860	10.0
Total votes		8,642	100.0
Democratic hold			

=== District 24 ===
Alabama's 24th House of Representatives district election, 2014
Party	Candidate	Votes	%
Republican	Todd Greeson (incumbent)	7,967	53.3
Democratic	Nathaniel Ledbetter	6,971	46.7
Total votes		14,938	100.0
Republican hold			

=== District 25 ===
Alabama's 25th House of Representatives district election, 2014
Party	Candidate	Votes	%
Republican	Mac McCutcheon (incumbent)	17,822	98.3
Independent	Write-In	307	1.7
Total votes		18,129	100.0
Republican hold			

=== District 26 ===
Alabama's 26th House of Representatives district election, 2014
Party	Candidate	Votes	%
Republican	Kerry Rich	7,203	59.5
Independent	Write-In	23	0.2
Total votes		12,099	100.0
Republican hold			

=== District 27 ===
Alabama's 27th House of Representatives district election, 2014
Party	Candidate	Votes	%
Republican	Will Ainsworth	8,238	53.2
Democratic	Jeff McLaughlin	7,225	46.7
Independent	Write-In	19	0.2
Total votes		15,482	100.0
Republican hold			

=== District 28 ===
Alabama's 28th House of Representatives district election, 2014
Party	Candidate	Votes	%
Democratic	Craig Ford (incumbent)	8,208	96.8
Independent	Write-In	268	3.2
Total votes		8,476	100.0
Democratic hold			

=== District 29 ===
Alabama's 29th House of Representatives district election, 2014
Party	Candidate	Votes	%
Republican	Becky Nordgren	5,845	51.9
Democratic	Michael Gladden (incumbent)	5,406	48.0
Independent	Write-In	7	0.1
Total votes		11,258	100.0
Republican gain from Democratic			

=== District 30 ===
Alabama's 30th House of Representatives district election, 2014
Party	Candidate	Votes	%
Republican	Blaine Galliher (incumbent)	10,979	72.4
Democratic	Wally Burns	4,153	27.4
Independent	Write-In	24	0.2
Total votes		15,156	100.0
Republican hold			

=== District 31 ===
Alabama's 31st House of Representatives district election, 2014
Party	Candidate	Votes	%
Republican	Barry Mask (incumbent)	13,104	98.4
Independent	Write-In	219	1.6
Total votes		13,323	100.0
Republican hold			

=== District 32 ===
Alabama's 32nd House of Representatives district election, 2014
Party	Candidate	Votes	%
Democratic	Barbara Bigsby-Boyd (incumbent)	7,240	71.3
Republican	Ron Struzik	2,905	28.6
Independent	Write-In	11	0.1
Total votes		10,156	100.0
Democratic hold			

=== District 33 ===
Alabama's 33rd House of Representatives district election, 2014
Party	Candidate	Votes	%
Republican	Ron Johnson (incumbent)	9,567	98.2
Independent	Write-In	180	1.8
Total votes		9,747	100.0
Republican hold			

=== District 34 ===
Alabama's 34th House of Representatives district election, 2014
Party	Candidate	Votes	%
Republican	Elwyn Thomas (incumbent)	13,515	99.1
Independent	Write-In	123	0.9
Total votes		13,638	100.0
Republican hold			

=== District 35 ===
Alabama's 35th House of Representatives district election, 2014
Party	Candidate	Votes	%
Democratic	Steve Hurst (incumbent)	6,722	51.6
Republican	Steven M. Dean	6,295	48.3
Independent	Write-In	15	0.1
Total votes		13,032	100.0
Democratic hold			

=== District 36 ===
Alabama's 36th House of Representatives district election, 2014
Party	Candidate	Votes	%
Republican	Randy Wood (incumbent)	10,612	76.1
Democratic	Garry Bearden	3,301	23.7
Independent	Write-In	26	0.2
Total votes		13,939	100.0
Republican hold			

=== District 37 ===
Alabama's 37th House of Representatives district election, 2014
Party	Candidate	Votes	%
Democratic	Richard Laird (incumbent)	8,106	53.6
Republican	Bob Fincher	7,011	46.3
Independent	Write-In	14	0.1
Total votes		15,131	100.0
Democratic hold			

=== District 38 ===
Alabama's 38th House of Representatives district election, 2014
Party	Candidate	Votes	%
Republican	DuWayne Bridges (incumbent)	5,980	50.8
Democratic	Huey P. Long	5,748	48.8
Independent	Write-In	30	0.2
Total votes		11,768	100.0
Republican hold			

=== District 39 ===
Alabama's 39th House of Representatives district election, 2014
Party	Candidate	Votes	%
Democratic	Richard Lindsey (incumbent)	7,808	57.0
Republican	Tim Sprayberry	5,872	42.9
Independent	Write-In	14	0.1
Total votes		13,964	100.0
Democratic hold			

=== District 40 ===
Alabama's 40th House of Representatives district election, 2014
Party	Candidate	Votes	%
Republican	K. L. (Koven) Brown	8,587	62.4
Democratic	Ted Copeland	5,148	37.4
Independent	Write-In	24	0.2
Total votes		13,759	100.0
Republican hold			

=== District 41 ===
Alabama's 41st House of Representatives district election, 2014
Party	Candidate	Votes	%
Republican	Mike Hill (incumbent)	19,319	99.1
Independent	Write-In	169	0.9
Total votes		19,588	100.0
Republican hold			

=== District 42 ===
Alabama's 42nd House of Representatives district election, 2014
Party	Candidate	Votes	%
Republican	Jimmy Martin	9,382	63.2
Independent	Write-In	9	0.1
Total votes		14,843	100.0
Republican hold			

=== District 43 ===
Alabama's 43rd House of Representatives district election, 2014
Party	Candidate	Votes	%
Republican	Mary Sue McClurkin (incumbent)	16,368	80.1
Democratic	Virginia Sweet	4,041	19.8
Independent	Write-In	29	0.1
Total votes		20,438	100.0
Republican hold			

=== District 44 ===
Alabama's 44th House of Representatives district election, 2014
Party	Candidate	Votes	%
Republican	Arthur Payne (incumbent)	11,654	97.8
Independent	Write-In	267	2.2
Total votes		11,921	100.0
Republican hold			

=== District 45 ===
Alabama's 45th House of Representatives district election, 2014
Party	Candidate	Votes	%
Republican	Dickie Drake (incumbent)	8,165	61.5
Independent	Write-In	10	0.1
Total votes		13,278	100.0
Republican hold			

=== District 46 ===
Alabama's 46th House of Representatives district election, 2014
Party	Candidate	Votes	%
Republican	Paul DeMarco (incumbent)	15,446	98.9
Independent	Write-In	165	1.1
Total votes		15,611	100.0
Republican hold			

=== District 47 ===
Alabama's 47th House of Representatives district election, 2014
Party	Candidate	Votes	%
Republican	Jack Williams (incumbent)	7,073	72.7
Democratic	Salvatore Bambinelli	2,642	27.15
Independent	Write-In	15	0.15
Total votes		9,730	100.0
Republican hold			

=== District 48 ===
Alabama's 48th House of Representatives district election, 2014
Party	Candidate	Votes	%
Republican	Greg Canfield (incumbent)	16,859	99.0
Independent	Write-In	169	1.0
Total votes		17,028	100.0
Republican hold			

=== District 49 ===
Alabama's 49th House of Representatives district election, 2014
Party	Candidate	Votes	%
Republican	April Weaver	12,411	99.0
Independent	Write-In	127	1.0
Total votes		12,538	100.0
Republican hold			

=== District 50 ===
Alabama's 50th House of Representatives district election, 2014
Party	Candidate	Votes	%
Republican	Jim McClendon (incumbent)	14,248	99.0
Independent	Write-In	143	1.0
Total votes		14,391	100.0
Republican hold			

=== District 51 ===
Alabama's 51st House of Representatives district election, 2014
Party	Candidate	Votes	%
Republican	Allen Treadaway (incumbent)	14,061	99.0
Independent	Write-In	149	1.0
Total votes		14,210	100.0
Republican hold			

=== District 52 ===
Alabama's 52nd House of Representatives district election, 2014
Party	Candidate	Votes	%
Democratic	John Rogers (incumbent)	9,599	97.5
Independent	Write-In	242	2.5
Total votes		9,841	100.0
Democratic hold			

=== District 53 ===
Alabama's 53rd House of Representatives district election, 2014
Party	Candidate	Votes	%
Democratic	Demetrius Newton (incumbent)	7,729	98.9
Independent	Write-In	87	1.1
Total votes		7,816	100.0
Democratic hold			

=== District 54 ===
Alabama's 54th House of Representatives district election, 2014
Party	Candidate	Votes	%
Democratic	Patricia Todd (incumbent)	7,599	98.7
Independent	Write-In	97	1.3
Total votes		7,696	100.0
Democratic hold			

=== District 55 ===
Alabama's 55th House of Representatives district election, 2014
Party	Candidate	Votes	%
Democratic	Rod Scott (incumbent)	8,670	99.1
Independent	Write-In	80	0.9
Total votes		8,750	100.0
Democratic hold			

=== District 56 ===
Alabama's 56th House of Representatives district election, 2014
Party	Candidate	Votes	%
Democratic	Lawrence McAdory (incumbent)	9,881	98.4
Independent	Write-In	160	1.6
Total votes		10,041	100.0
Democratic hold			

=== District 57 ===
Alabama's 57th House of Representatives district election, 2014
Party	Candidate	Votes	%
Democratic	Merika Coleman (incumbent)	10,676	98.7
Independent	Write-In	140	1.3
Total votes		10,816	100.0
Democratic hold			

=== District 58 ===
Alabama's 58th House of Representatives district election, 2014
Party	Candidate	Votes	%
Democratic	Oliver Robinson (incumbent)	9,704	99.2
Independent	Write-In	74	0.8
Total votes		9,778	100.0
Democratic hold			

=== District 59 ===
Alabama's 59th House of Representatives district election, 2014
Party	Candidate	Votes	%
Democratic	Mary Moore (incumbent)	7,521	98.7
Independent	Write-In	101	1.3
Total votes		7,622	100.0
Democratic hold			

=== District 60 ===
Alabama's 60th House of Representatives district election, 2014
Party	Candidate	Votes	%
Democratic	Juandalynn "Lee Lee" Givan	10,383	98.8
Independent	Write-In	127	1.2
Total votes		10,510	100.0
Democratic hold			

=== District 61 ===
Alabama's 61st House of Representatives district election, 2014
Party	Candidate	Votes	%
Democratic	Alan Harper (incumbent)	11,102	77.8
Republican	Frank Chandler	3,167	22.2
Independent	Write-In	4	0.0
Total votes		14,273	100.0
Democratic hold			

=== District 62 ===
Alabama's 62nd House of Representatives district election, 2014
Party	Candidate	Votes	%
Republican	John Merrill	11,658	86.7
Constitution	Steven Kneussle	1,694	12.6
Independent	Write-In	100	0.7
Total votes		13,452	100.0
Republican hold			

=== District 63 ===
Alabama's 63rd House of Representatives district election, 2014
Party	Candidate	Votes	%
Republican	Bill Poole	9,937	63.8
Democratic	Susan Pace Hamill	5,631	36.1
Independent	Write-In	14	0.1
Total votes		15,582	100.0
Republican hold			

=== District 64 ===
Alabama's 64th House of Representatives district election, 2014
Party	Candidate	Votes	%
Republican	Harry Shiver (incumbent)	8,524	98.5
Independent	Write-In	128	1.5
Total votes		8,652	100.0
Republican hold			

=== District 65 ===
Alabama's 65th House of Representatives district election, 2014
Party	Candidate	Votes	%
Democratic	Elaine Beech	11,727	85.8
Independent	Ozelle Hubert	1,920	14.0
Independent	Write-In	25	0.2
Total votes		13,692	100.0
Democratic hold			

=== District 66 ===
Alabama's 66th House of Representatives district election, 2014
Party	Candidate	Votes	%
Republican	Alan Baker (incumbent)	8,615	98.9
Independent	Write-In	98	1.1
Total votes		8,713	100.0
Republican hold			

=== District 67 ===
Alabama's 67th House of Representatives district election, 2014
Party	Candidate	Votes	%
Democratic	Dario Melton	10,382	98.5
Independent	Write-In	156	1.5
Total votes		10,538	100.0
Democratic hold			

=== District 68 ===
Alabama's 68th House of Representatives district election, 2014
Party	Candidate	Votes	%
Democratic	Thomas E. (Action) Jackson (incumbent)	10,471	98.9
Independent	Write-In	113	1.1
Total votes		10,584	100.0
Democratic hold			

=== District 69 ===
Alabama's 69th House of Representatives district election, 2014
Party	Candidate	Votes	%
Democratic	David Colston	11,058	98.6
Independent	Write-In	157	1.4
Total votes		11,215	100.0
Democratic hold			

=== District 70 ===
Alabama's 70th House of Representatives district election, 2014
Party	Candidate	Votes	%
Democratic	Christopher John England (incumbent)	7,611	99.1
Independent	Write-In	70	0.9
Total votes		7,681	100.0
Democratic hold			

=== District 71 ===
Alabama's 71st House of Representatives district election, 2014
Party	Candidate	Votes	%
Democratic	Artis "A. J." McCampbell (incumbent)	12,261	99.2
Independent	Write-In	100	0.8
Total votes		12,361	100.0
Democratic hold			

=== District 72 ===
Alabama's 72nd House of Representatives district election, 2014
Party	Candidate	Votes	%
Democratic	Ralph A. Howard (incumbent)	11,552	98.8
Independent	Write-In	143	1.2
Total votes		11,695	100.0
Democratic hold			

=== District 73 ===
Alabama's 73rd House of Representatives district election, 2014
Party	Candidate	Votes	%
Republican	Matt Fridy	7,825	49.0
Independent	Write-In	15	0.1
Total votes		15,977	100.0
Republican gain from Democratic			

=== District 74 ===
Alabama's 74th House of Representatives district election, 2014
Party	Candidate	Votes	%
Republican	Jay Love (incumbent)	8,714	76.9
Independent	Jay King	2,562	22.6
Independent	Write-In	54	0.5
Total votes		11,330	100.0
Republican hold			

=== District 75 ===
Alabama's 75th House of Representatives district election, 2014
Party	Candidate	Votes	%
Republican	Greg Wren (incumbent)	14,046	71.6
Democratic	Glenn L. Allen	5,551	28.3
Independent	Write-In	23	0.1
Total votes		19,620	100.0
Republican hold			

=== District 76 ===
Alabama's 76th House of Representatives district election, 2014
Party	Candidate	Votes	%
Democratic	Thad McClammy (incumbent)	10,092	98.0
Independent	Write-In	210	2.0
Total votes		10,302	100.0
Democratic hold			

=== District 77 ===
Alabama's 77th House of Representatives district election, 2014
Party	Candidate	Votes	%
Democratic	John Knight (incumbent)	8,353	98.3
Independent	Write-In	145	1.7
Total votes		8,498	100.0
Democratic hold			

=== District 78 ===
Alabama's 78th House of Representatives district election, 2014
Party	Candidate	Votes	%
Democratic	Alvin Holmes (incumbent)	7,349	81.2
Independent	Ken Guin	1,313	14.5
Independent	Write-In	389	4.3
Total votes		9,041	100.0
Democratic hold			

=== District 79 ===
Alabama's 79th House of Representatives district election, 2014
Party	Candidate	Votes	%
Republican	Mike Hubbard (incumbent)	11,128	97.3
Independent	Write-In	311	2.7
Total votes		11,439	100.0
Republican hold			

=== District 80 ===
Alabama's 80th House of Representatives district election, 2014
Party	Candidate	Votes	%
Democratic	Lesley Vance (incumbent)	5,579	54.6
Republican	Mervin Dudley	4,626	45.3
Independent	Write-In	16	0.2
Total votes		10,211	100.0
Democratic hold			

=== District 81 ===
Alabama's 81st House of Representatives district election, 2014
Party	Candidate	Votes	%
Republican	Mark Tuggle	9,268	55.9
Democratic	Betty Carol Graham (incumbent)	7,306	44.1
Independent	Write-In	4	0.0
Total votes		16,578	100.0
Republican gain from Democratic			

=== District 82 ===
Alabama's 82nd House of Representatives district election, 2014
Party	Candidate	Votes	%
Democratic	Pebblin W. Warren (incumbent)	10,180	98.0
Independent	Write-In	209	2.0
Total votes		10,389	100.0
Democratic hold			

=== District 83 ===
Alabama's 83rd House of Representatives district election, 2014
Party	Candidate	Votes	%
Democratic	George "Tootie" Bandy (incumbent)	7,484	96.9
Independent	Write-In	237	3.1
Total votes		7,721	100.0
Democratic hold			

=== District 84 ===
Alabama's 84th House of Representatives district election, 2014
Party	Candidate	Votes	%
Democratic	Berry Forte	7,764	65.1
Republican	Joyce L. Perrin	4,152	34.8
Independent	Write-In	12	0.1
Total votes		11,928	100.0
Democratic hold			

=== District 85 ===
Alabama's 85th House of Representatives district election, 2014
Party	Candidate	Votes	%
Democratic	Dexter Grimsley	6,692	51.6
Republican	Jody Singleton	6,255	48.2
Independent	Write-In	23	0.2
Total votes		12,970	100.0
Democratic hold			

=== District 86 ===
Alabama's 86th House of Representatives district election, 2014
Party	Candidate	Votes	%
Republican	Paul Lee	9,159	58.0
Democratic	Merritt Carothers	6,623	41.9
Independent	Write-In	20	0.1
Total votes		15,802	100.0
Republican hold			

=== District 87 ===
Alabama's 87th House of Representatives district election, 2014
Party	Candidate	Votes	%
Republican	Donnie Chesteen	14,347	99.0
Independent	Write-In	146	1.0
Total votes		14,493	100.0
Republican hold			

=== District 88 ===
Alabama's 88th House of Representatives district election, 2014
Party	Candidate	Votes	%
Republican	Paul Beckman	14,382	98.4
Independent	Write-In	229	1.6
Total votes		14,611	100.0
Republican hold			

=== District 89 ===
Alabama's 89th House of Representatives district election, 2014
Party	Candidate	Votes	%
Democratic	Alan C. Boothe (incumbent)	7,912	97.7
Independent	Write-In	186	2.3
Total votes		8,098	100.0
Democratic hold			

=== District 90 ===
Alabama's 90th House of Representatives district election, 2014
Party	Candidate	Votes	%
Democratic	Charles Newton (incumbent)	8,577	59.4
Republican	Jerry Hartin	5,855	40.5
Independent	Write-In	14	0.1
Total votes		14,446	100.0
Democratic hold			

=== District 91 ===
Alabama's 91st House of Representatives district election, 2014
Party	Candidate	Votes	%
Republican	Barry Moore	9,754	64.3
Democratic	Terry Spicer (incumbent)	5,383	35.5
Independent	Write-In	30	0.2
Total votes		15,167	100.0
Republican gain from Democratic			

=== District 92 ===
Alabama's 92nd House of Representatives district election, 2014
Party	Candidate	Votes	%
Republican	Mike Jones Jr.	6,820	52.1
Independent	Don Cotton	3,180	24.3
Democratic	David S. Darby	3,086	23.6
Independent	Write-In	13	0.1
Total votes		13,099	100.0
Republican gain from Democratic			

=== District 93 ===
Alabama's 93rd House of Representatives district election, 2014
Party	Candidate	Votes	%
Republican	Steve Clouse (incumbent)	11,418	77.5
Democratic	Ronnie Helms	3,271	22.2
Independent	Write-In	36	0.3
Total votes		14,275	100.0
Republican hold			

=== District 94 ===
Alabama's 94th House of Representatives district election, 2014
Party	Candidate	Votes	%
Republican	Joe Faust (incumbent)	16,481	98.9
Independent	Write-In	178	1.1
Total votes		16,659	100.0
Republican hold			

=== District 95 ===
Alabama's 95th House of Representatives district election, 2014
Party	Candidate	Votes	%
Republican	Steve McMillan (incumbent)	16,239	99.0
Independent	Write-In	156	1.0
Total votes		16,395	100.0
Republican hold			

=== District 96 ===
Alabama's 96th House of Representatives district election, 2014
Party	Candidate	Votes	%
Republican	Randy Davis (incumbent)	13,319	98.8
Independent	Write-In	157	1.2
Total votes		13,476	100.0
Republican hold			

=== District 97 ===
Alabama's 97th House of Representatives district election, 2014
Party	Candidate	Votes	%
Democratic	Yvonne Kennedy (incumbent)	6,714	97.1
Independent	Write-In	200	2.9
Total votes		6,914	100.0
Democratic hold			

=== District 98 ===
Alabama's 98th House of Representatives district election, 2014
Party	Candidate	Votes	%
Democratic	Napoleon Bracy Jr.	6,767	60.6
Republican	Sharon L. Powe	3,222	28.9
Independent	Write-In	1,177	10.5
Total votes		11,166	100.0
Democratic hold			

=== District 99 ===
Alabama's 99th House of Representatives district election, 2014
Party	Candidate	Votes	%
Democratic	James E. Buskey (incumbent)	8,554	82.3
Independent	Rashawn Figures	1,800	17.3
Independent	Write-In	45	0.4
Total votes		10,399	100.0
Democratic hold			

=== District 100 ===
Alabama's 100th House of Representatives district election, 2014
Party	Candidate	Votes	%
Republican	Victor Gaston (incumbent)	12,640	98.8
Independent	Write-In	154	1.2
Total votes		12,794	100.0
Republican hold			

=== District 101 ===
Alabama's 101st House of Representatives district election, 2014
Party	Candidate	Votes	%
Republican	Jamie Ison (incumbent)	8,414	98.2
Independent	Write-In	155	1.8
Total votes		8,569	100.0
Republican hold			

=== District 102 ===
Alabama's 102nd House of Representatives district election, 2014
Party	Candidate	Votes	%
Republican	Chad Fincher (incumbent)	9,641	99.0
Independent	Write-In	99	1.0
Total votes		9,740	100.0
Republican hold			

=== District 103 ===
Alabama's 103rd House of Representatives district election, 2014
Party	Candidate	Votes	%
Democratic	Joseph C. Mitchell (incumbent)	6,962	98.9
Independent	Write-In	75	1.1
Total votes		7,037	100.0
Democratic hold			

=== District 104 ===
Alabama's 104th House of Representatives district election, 2014
Party	Candidate	Votes	%
Republican	Jim Barton (incumbent)	11,155	98.7
Independent	Write-In	144	1.3
Total votes		11,299	100.0
Republican hold			

=== District 105 ===
Alabama's 105th House of Representatives district election, 2014
Party	Candidate	Votes	%
Republican	Spencer Collier (incumbent)	7,807	98.3
Independent	Write-In	135	1.7
Total votes		7,942	100.0
Republican hold			

== See also ==
- List of Alabama state legislatures
