= 2016 United States presidential election in Alabama =

- November 8, 2016
- Turnout: 66.8% (▼6.4)

Nominee	Donald Trump	Hillary Clinton
Party	Republican	Democratic
Home state	New York	New York
Running mate	Mike Pence	Tim Kaine
Electoral vote	9	0
Popular vote	1,318,255	729,547
Percentage	62.08%	34.36%

Trump
40–50%
50–60%
60–70%
70–80%
80–90%
90–100%
Clinton
40–50%
50–60%
60–70%
70–80%
80–90%
90–100%
President before election
Barack Obama
Democratic
Elected President
Donald Trump
Republican

Treemap of the popular vote by county.

The 2016 United States presidential election in Alabama was held on Tuesday, November 8, 2016, as part of the 2016 United States presidential election in which all 50 states plus the District of Columbia participated. Alabama voters chose electors to represent them in the Electoral College via a popular vote, pitting the Republican Party's nominee, businessman Donald Trump, and running mate Indiana Governor Mike Pence against Democratic Party nominee, former Secretary of State Hillary Clinton, and her running mate Virginia Senator Tim Kaine. Alabama has nine electoral votes in the Electoral College.

Alabama has voted for the Republican candidate in every election since it was won by Ronald Reagan in 1980. As such, Trump was heavily favored to win the state. On the day of the election, Trump won the election in Alabama with 62.08% of the vote, while Clinton received 34.36% of the vote. The state had given 60.55% of its votes to Republican nominee Mitt Romney in 2012, meaning that it had shifted 1.53% more Republican from the previous election. Trump's margin of victory in Alabama was 27.72%, a 5.53% increase from Romney's 22.19% margin of victory. Alabama did not swing particularly hard to the right, as its white voters without college degrees were already extremely Republican.

This was the largest loss by a Democrat since Democratic nominee George McGovern in 1972. On the other hand, Trump became the first Republican to win the White House without carrying Jefferson County since Richard Nixon in 1968, and Clinton the first Democrat since Adlai Stevenson II in 1952 to carry the county without winning the White House.

== Primary elections ==
=== Democratic primary ===
==== Results ====
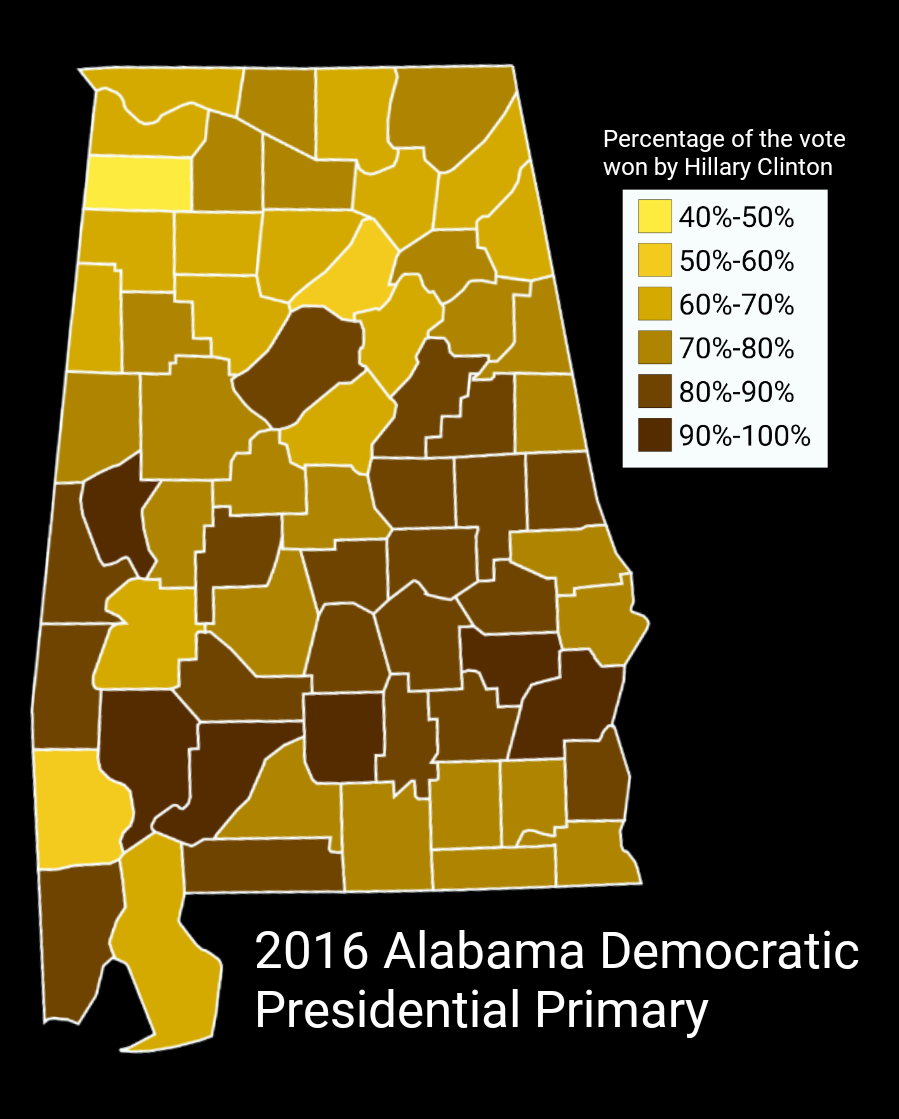
Results of the Democratic primary by county.

2016 Democratic Party's presidential nominating process in Alabama – Summary of results –
Candidate	Popular vote (March 1 primary)		Estimated delegates		
Candidate	Count	Percentage	Pledged	Unpledged	Total
Hillary Clinton (campaign)	309,928	77.84%	44	6	50
Bernie Sanders (campaign)	76,399	19.19%	9	0	9
Martin O'Malley (campaign) (withdrawn)	1,485	0.37%			
Rocky De La Fuente (campaign)	811	0.20%			
Uncommitted	9,534	2.39%	0	1	1
Total	398,157	100%	53	7	60

=== Republican primary ===
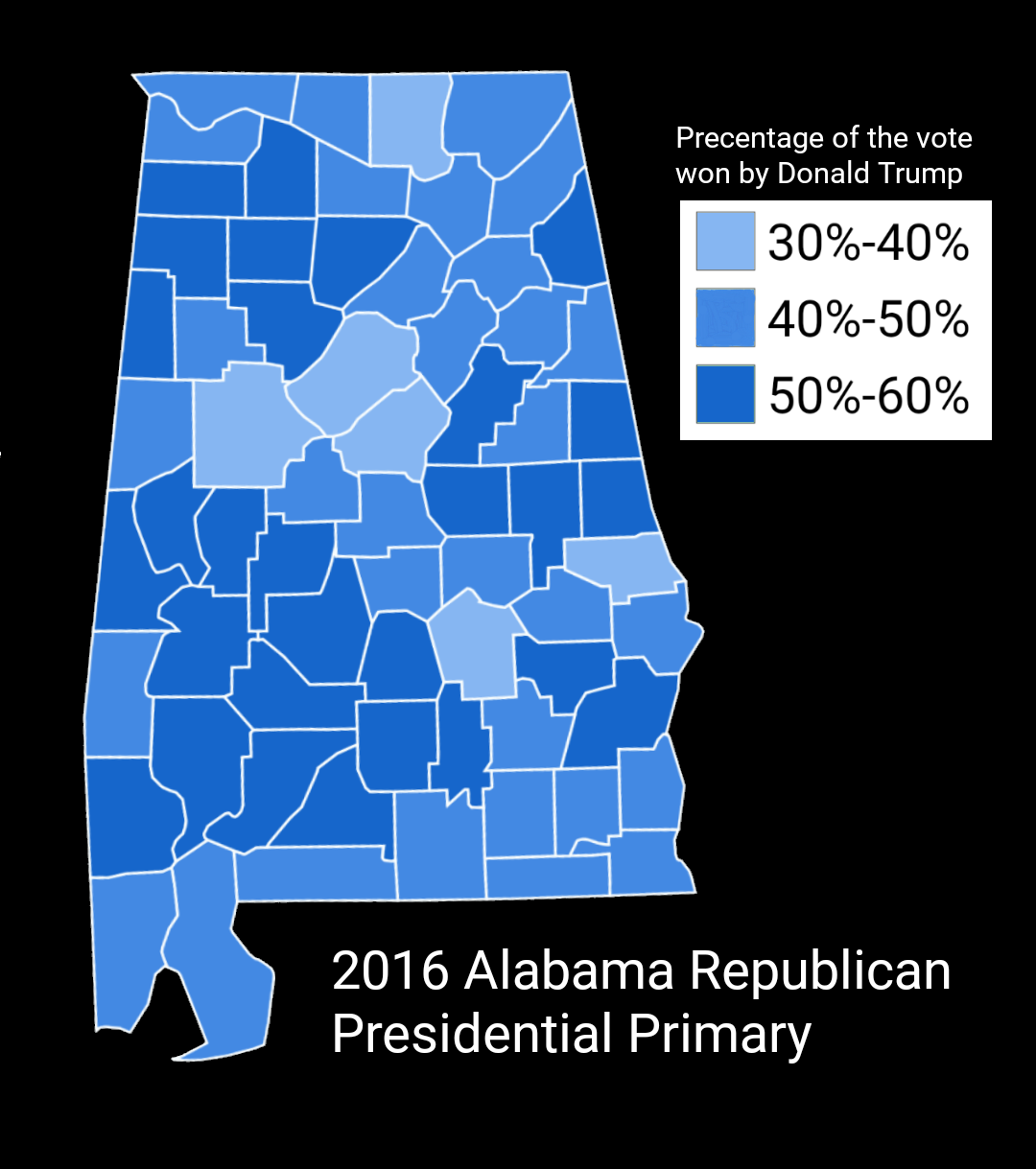
Map showing the results of the 2016 Republican presidential primary in Alabama by county

Alabama Republican primary, March 1, 2016
Candidate	Votes	Percentage	Actual delegate count		
Candidate	Votes	Percentage	Bound	Unbound	Total
Donald Trump	373,721	43.42%	36	0	36
Ted Cruz	181,479	21.09%	13	0	13
Marco Rubio	160,606	18.66%	1	0	1
Ben Carson	88,094	10.24%	0	0	0
John Kasich	38,119	4.43%	0	0	0
Uncommitted	7,953	0.92%	0	0	0
Jeb Bush (withdrawn)	3,974	0.46%	0	0	0
Mike Huckabee (withdrawn)	2,539	0.30%	0	0	0
Rand Paul (withdrawn)	1,895	0.22%	0	0	0
Chris Christie (withdrawn)	858	0.10%	0	0	0
Rick Santorum (withdrawn)	617	0.07%	0	0	0
Carly Fiorina (withdrawn)	544	0.06%	0	0	0
Lindsey Graham (withdrawn)	253	0.03%	0	0	0
Unprojected delegates:			0	0	0
Total:	860,652	100.00%	50	0	50
Source: The Green Papers

== General election ==
=== Predictions ===
The following are final 2016 predictions from various organizations for Alabama as of Election Day.

Source	Ranking	As of
Los Angeles Times	Safe R	November 6, 2016
CNN	Safe R	November 8, 2016
Rothenberg Political Report	Safe R	November 7, 2016
Sabato's Crystal Ball	Safe R	November 7, 2016
NBC	Likely R	November 7, 2016
RealClearPolitics	Safe R	November 8, 2016
Fox News	Safe R	November 7, 2016
ABC	Safe R	November 7, 2016

=== Results ===
Chart of popular vote
1. Trump (62.1%)
2. Clinton (34.4%)
3. Johnson (2.09%)
4. Write-ins (1.02%)
5. Stein (0.44%)

2016 United States presidential election in Alabama
Party	Candidate	Votes	%	±%
Republican	Donald Trump	1,318,255	62.08%	+1.53%
Democratic	Hillary Clinton	729,547	34.36%	−4.00%
Independent	Gary Johnson	44,467	2.09%	+1.50%
Independent	Jill Stein	9,391	0.44%	+0.28%
Write-in		21,712	1.02%	N/A
Total votes		2,123,372	100.00%	N/A

==== By county ====
County	Donald Trump Republican		Hillary Clinton Democratic		Various candidates Other parties		Margin		Total
County	#	%	#	%	#	%	#	%	Total
Autauga	18,172	72.77%	5,936	23.77%	865	3.46%	12,236	49.00%	24,973
Baldwin	72,883	76.55%	18,458	19.39%	3,874	4.07%	54,425	57.16%	95,215
Barbour	5,454	52.10%	4,871	46.53%	144	1.38%	583	5.57%	10,469
Bibb	6,738	76.40%	1,874	21.25%	207	2.35%	4,864	55.15%	8,819
Blount	22,859	89.33%	2,156	8.43%	573	2.24%	20,703	80.91%	25,588
Bullock	1,140	24.20%	3,530	74.95%	40	0.85%	-2,390	-50.74%	4,710
Butler	4,901	56.13%	3,726	42.67%	105	1.20%	1,175	13.46%	8,732
Calhoun	32,865	68.66%	13,242	27.67%	1,757	3.67%	19,623	41.00%	47,864
Chambers	7,843	56.42%	5,784	41.61%	273	1.96%	2,059	14.81%	13,900
Cherokee	8,953	83.42%	1,547	14.41%	233	2.17%	7,406	69.00%	10,733
Chilton	15,081	82.10%	2,911	15.85%	377	2.05%	12,170	66.25%	18,369
Choctaw	4,106	56.31%	3,109	42.64%	77	1.06%	997	13.67%	7,292
Clarke	7,140	54.79%	5,749	44.12%	142	1.09%	1,391	10.67%	13,031
Clay	5,245	79.18%	1,237	18.67%	142	2.14%	4,008	60.51%	6,624
Cleburne	5,764	87.43%	684	10.37%	145	2.20%	5,080	77.05%	6,593
Coffee	15,875	76.44%	4,221	20.33%	671	3.23%	11,654	56.12%	20,767
Colbert	16,746	67.21%	7,312	29.35%	857	3.44%	9,434	37.86%	24,915
Conecuh	3,420	51.94%	3,080	46.77%	85	1.29%	340	5.16%	6,585
Coosa	3,381	64.38%	1,782	33.93%	89	1.69%	1,599	30.45%	5,252
Covington	13,267	83.23%	2,387	14.97%	286	1.79%	10,880	68.26%	15,940
Crenshaw	4,513	72.01%	1,664	26.55%	90	1.44%	2,849	45.46%	6,267
Cullman	32,989	87.10%	3,798	10.03%	1,086	2.87%	29,191	77.08%	37,873
Dale	13,808	73.65%	4,413	23.54%	528	2.82%	9,395	50.11%	18,749
Dallas	5,789	30.81%	12,836	68.31%	167	0.89%	-7,047	-37.50%	18,792
DeKalb	21,405	82.88%	3,622	14.02%	799	3.09%	17,783	68.86%	25,826
Elmore	27,634	74.17%	8,443	22.66%	1,183	3.17%	19,191	51.51%	37,260
Escambia	9,935	66.92%	4,605	31.02%	305	2.05%	5,330	35.90%	14,845
Etowah	32,353	73.26%	10,442	23.64%	1,369	3.10%	21,911	49.61%	44,164
Fayette	6,712	81.37%	1,362	16.51%	175	2.12%	5,350	64.86%	8,249
Franklin	9,466	78.62%	2,197	18.25%	377	3.13%	7,269	60.37%	12,040
Geneva	9,994	85.00%	1,525	12.97%	239	2.03%	8,469	72.03%	11,758
Greene	838	17.17%	4,013	82.23%	29	0.59%	-3,175	-65.06%	4,880
Hale	3,173	39.47%	4,775	59.39%	92	1.14%	-1,602	-19.93%	8,040
Henry	5,632	69.77%	2,292	28.39%	148	1.83%	3,340	41.38%	8,072
Houston	30,728	72.07%	10,664	25.01%	1,247	2.92%	20,064	47.06%	42,639
Jackson	16,672	79.45%	3,673	17.50%	639	3.05%	12,999	61.95%	20,984
Jefferson	134,768	44.30%	156,873	51.57%	12,550	4.13%	-22,105	-7.27%	304,191
Lamar	5,823	83.59%	1,036	14.87%	107	1.54%	4,787	68.72%	6,966
Lauderdale	27,899	70.59%	9,952	25.18%	1,674	4.24%	17,947	45.41%	39,525
Lawrence	10,833	73.05%	3,627	24.46%	369	2.49%	7,206	48.59%	14,829
Lee	34,617	58.48%	21,230	35.87%	3,344	5.65%	13,387	22.62%	59,191
Limestone	29,067	72.14%	9,468	23.50%	1,759	4.37%	19,599	48.64%	40,294
Lowndes	1,751	26.20%	4,883	73.06%	50	0.75%	-3,132	-46.86%	6,684
Macon	1,431	15.66%	7,566	82.78%	143	1.56%	-6,135	-67.12%	9,140
Madison	89,520	54.79%	62,822	38.45%	11,047	6.76%	26,698	16.34%	163,389
Marengo	5,233	47.60%	5,615	51.07%	146	1.33%	-382	-3.47%	10,994
Marion	11,274	86.83%	1,432	11.03%	278	2.14%	9,842	75.80%	12,984
Marshall	29,233	82.78%	4,917	13.92%	1,166	3.30%	24,316	68.85%	35,316
Mobile	95,116	55.06%	72,186	41.79%	5,435	3.15%	22,930	13.27%	172,737
Monroe	5,795	56.42%	4,332	42.18%	144	1.40%	1,463	14.24%	10,271
Montgomery	34,003	35.46%	58,916	61.45%	2,959	3.09%	-24,913	-25.98%	95,878
Morgan	37,486	74.02%	11,254	22.22%	1,904	3.76%	26,232	51.80%	50,644
Perry	1,407	26.66%	3,824	72.45%	47	0.89%	-2,417	-45.79%	5,278
Pickens	5,456	57.18%	3,972	41.63%	114	1.19%	1,484	15.55%	9,542
Pike	7,693	58.42%	5,056	38.40%	419	3.18%	2,637	20.03%	13,168
Randolph	7,705	75.64%	2,291	22.49%	191	1.87%	5,414	53.15%	10,187
Russell	9,210	47.83%	9,579	49.75%	467	2.43%	-369	-1.92%	19,256
Shelby	73,020	72.12%	22,977	22.69%	5,257	5.19%	50,043	49.42%	101,254
St. Clair	31,651	82.42%	5,589	14.55%	1,160	3.02%	26,062	67.87%	38,400
Sumter	1,581	24.66%	4,746	74.03%	84	1.31%	-3,165	-49.37%	6,411
Talladega	20,614	61.71%	12,121	36.28%	672	2.01%	8,493	25.42%	33,407
Tallapoosa	13,594	69.76%	5,519	28.32%	373	1.91%	8,075	41.44%	19,486
Tuscaloosa	47,723	57.71%	31,762	38.41%	3,215	3.89%	15,961	19.30%	82,700
Walker	24,266	82.34%	4,497	15.26%	709	2.41%	19,769	67.08%	29,472
Washington	6,042	70.81%	2,374	27.82%	117	1.37%	3,668	42.99%	8,533
Wilcox	1,742	28.45%	4,339	70.86%	42	0.69%	-2,597	-42.41%	6,123
Winston	9,228	89.48%	872	8.46%	213	2.07%	8,356	81.02%	10,313
Totals	1,318,255	62.08%	729,547	34.36%	75,570	3.56%	588,708	27.73%	2,123,372

Counties that flipped from Democratic to Republican

- Barbour (largest city: Eufaula)
- Conecuh (largest city: Evergreen)

==== By congressional district ====
Trump won six of seven congressional districts.

District	Trump	Clinton	Representative
1st	63%	34%	Bradley Byrne
2nd	64%	33%	Martha Roby
3rd	65%	32%	Mike Rogers
4th	80%	17%	Robert Aderholt
5th	64%	31%	Mo Brooks
6th	70%	26%	Gary Palmer
7th	29%	69%	Terri Sewell

=== Turnout ===
According to the Alabama Secretary of State website, voter turnout was 66.82% with 2,137,482 ballots cast out of 3,198,703 registered voters.

== Electors ==
Alabama had 9 electors in 2016 all of them voted for Donald Trump for president and Mike Pence for vice president.

The electors were:

- Frank Burt Jr.
- Will Sellers
- James Eldon Wilson
- Tim Wadsworth
- J. Elbert Peters
- Mary Sue McClurkin
- Robert A. Cusanelli
- Perry O. Hooper Jr.
- Grady H. Thornton

== See also ==
- 2016 Democratic Party presidential debates and forums
- 2016 Democratic Party presidential primaries
- 2016 Republican Party presidential debates and forums
- 2016 Republican Party presidential primaries
- United States presidential elections in Alabama
