= Danny Garrett =

American politician

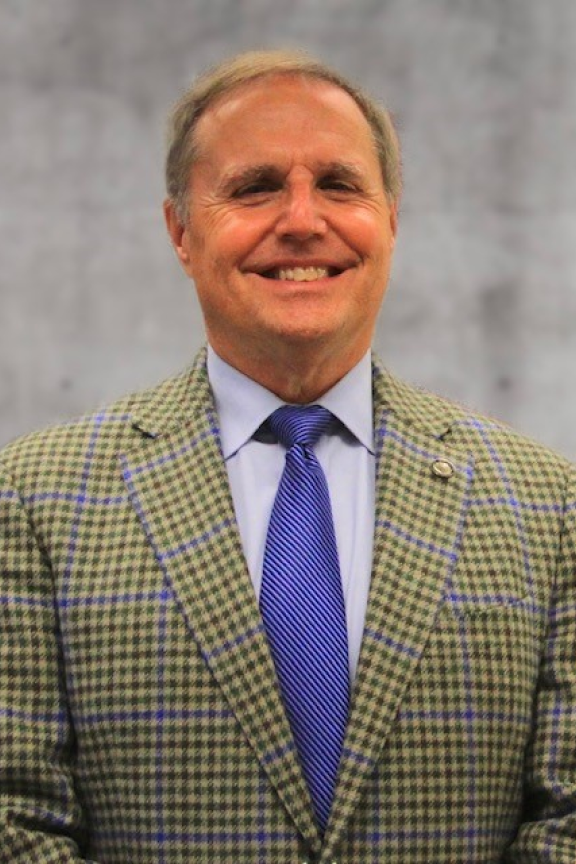

Member of the Alabama House of Representatives from the 44th district
- Incumbent
- Assumed office November 5, 2014
- Preceded by: Arthur Payne

Personal details
- Born: October 11, 1957 (age 69)
- Party: Republican

Danny Garrett (born October 11, 1957) is an American politician who has represented District 44 in the Alabama House of Representatives since 2014. A member of the Republican Party, Garrett currently serves as the House majority whip. He represents the 44th House District in Jefferson County, which includes the cities of Trussville, Clay and portions of Pinson.

== Personal life ==
Garrett is the oldest of four children born to John Ray Garrett, Jr. and Shirley Ferguson Garrett. He was born in Memphis, Tennessee and his family moved to Decatur, Alabama on his first birthday in 1958. In 1962, the family moved to Center Point, which was then a suburb of Birmingham. Garrett attended Erwin Elementary School, Erwin Junior High School and Erwin High School (now Center Point High School), graduating in 1976. He was elected class president in both his junior and senior years.

From 1976 to 1978, Garrett attended the University of Alabama at Birmingham. In 1978, he transferred to the University of Alabama in Tuscaloosa, where he earned a bachelor's and a master's degree.

In 1984, Garrett married Carol Sisson of Haleyville, Alabama. The couple first met as students while at the University of Alabama. They have three married adult sons and one grandchild.

== Political career ==
In 2010, Garrett was appointed by the Trussville City Council to the Trussville City Schools Board of Education. He was named vice president of the Board in 2012.

In 2014, Garrett ran for the open seat of State Representative for House District 44, which had been held for 36 years by Arthur Payne.

In 2018, Garrett was re-elected without opposition.

Garrett currently serves as House majority whip, a position he was selected for in 2018. He serves as vice chair of the Education Ways and Means Committee and Education Policy Committee. He also serves as a member of the Fiscal Responsibility Committee and previously served as a member of the Small Business and Commerce Committee. Garrett served as co-chair of the Joint Task Force on Budget Reform and Co-Chair of the Joint Task Force on the Tax Cuts and Jobs Act. During the COVID-19 pandemic in 2020, he was named chair of the Emergency Small Business Task Force subcommittee of the Executive Branch Small Business Commission, which prepared detailed plans, procedures and recommendations for reopening the state's economy. Garrett also was appointed to the Lieutenant Governor's Workforce Development Task Force.

== Business career ==
Upon graduation from college, Garrett began his career with the Birmingham office of Ernst & Young, during which time he passed the Certified Public Accountant exam. In 1983, Garrett joined Sonat oil and gas company as a tax analyst. In 1986, he was named director of finance and planning for Birmingham Steel Corporation, a mini-mill steel producer. He worked for Birmingham Steel for sixteen years in a number of positions. For two years, he relocated to Cleveland, Ohio, where he oversaw the acquisition and assimilation of American Steel & Wire Corporation, a steel rod and wire producer. Following a series of management changes that began in 1997, Birmingham Steel's chairman/chief executive officer was removed from office as a result of a proxy contest. Garrett, then vice president of finance, was promoted by the new management and board of directors to executive vice president and CFO. During most of his tenure with Birmingham Steel, Garrett was the company's primary contract for Wall Street investment and banking firms, institutional investors, and shareholders. In 2002, Birmingham Steel was sold to Nucor Corporation for $550 million.

In 2003, Garrett joined NABI (North American Bus Industries) as the chief financial officer for North American operations. The company primarily sold buses to transit authorities located in the United States, and the company's assembly plant was located in Anniston, Alabama. During his tenure with NABI, Garrett worked with numerous European banks and investors. Garrett was named interim chief executive officer of North American Operations and CFO for the worldwide group. He led efforts to restructure and turn around operations, which ultimately led to the sale in 2005 of NABI to Cerberus Capital Management, a private investment firm headquartered in New York.

In 2005, Garrett joined Progress Rail Services, a $1 billion provider of repair and maintenance services to the U.S. railroad industry, as senior vice president and chief financial officer. Progress Rail, headquartered in Albertville, Alabama, had recently been acquired by One Equity, an affiliate of J.P. Morgan, from Progress Energy for $400 million. Garrett was hired to help organize and structure the company to enable a possible public offering of the company's shares within a three- to four-year time frame. Along with other members of management, Garrett received an equity interest in the company. Within months of Garrett joining Progress Rail, market valuations for the railroad industry significantly increased, and the board of directors initiated a public offering process. Garrett led efforts to effect the IPO and comply with Security and Exchange Commission requirements and stock exchange listing requirements. Prior to the finalizing of the IPO, Caterpillar, Inc. made a cash offer in May 2005 to acquire the company for $1 billion. Garrett was offered a senior position with Caterpillar in Peoria, Illinois, but declined in order to maintain his residence in Alabama.

In 2007, Garrett served briefly as chief financial officer for Summit Products, a $35 million toy company headquartered in Birmingham. Garrett was hired to assist Summit with developing an expansion strategy with “big box” retailers and toy stores. Following a general decline in the overall U.S. economy in late 2008, the company's plans for expansion were no longer feasible. Garrett resigned and joined Vulcan Steel Products in 2009 as chief financial officer.

Vulcan, headquartered in Pelham, Alabama, was a family-owned steel company that had been adversely impacted by the U.S. economic decline. Garrett renegotiated the company's loan agreements and led efforts to develop and implement a turnaround strategy for the company. Within 12 months, the company streamlined operations, changed its management and operations structure, and returned to profitability. Garrett served as CFO for seven years and led efforts to sell the business at the direction of the owners. In 2016, the company was sold to Steel Dynamics (SDI), a multi-billion dollar steel producer headquartered in Fort Wayne, Indiana. Garrett, who had been elected to the Alabama Legislature in 2014, was offered a position with SDI in Fort Wayne, but declined the offer and remained in Alabama.

In 2016, Garrett briefly joined Signature Homes, a residential construction company headquartered in Hoover, Alabama, as chief financial officer. Garrett was asked by Signature's chief executive officer to assist with a management team transition of the current CFO to another role as chief operating officer. Garrett restructured the financial reporting and reorganized the financial staff while continuing to serve in the Legislature. He resigned in 2018, when a permanent CFO was hired.
