= Letson =

Letson is a surname. Notable people with the surname include:

- Al Letson (born 1972), American poet, journalist, and radio and podcast host
- Harry Letson (1896–1992), Canadian engineer and educator
- Jody Letson (born 1949), American politician
- Tom Letson (born 1952), American politician
