= Barry Moore (American politician) =

American politician (born 1966)

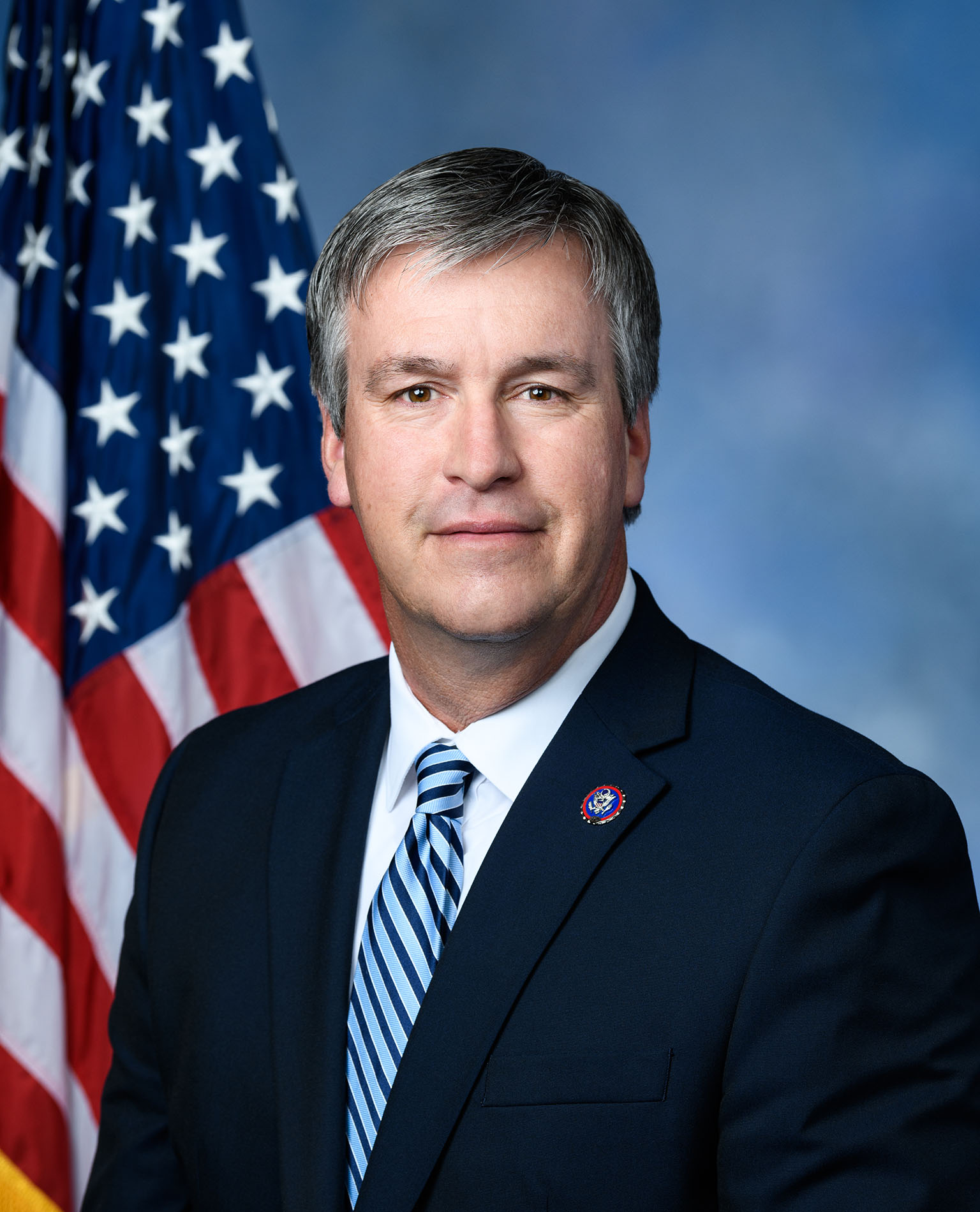
- Official portrait, 2021

United States Senator-elect from Alabama
- Assuming office January 3, 2027
- Succeeding: Tommy Tuberville

Member of the U.S. House of Representatives from Alabama
- Incumbent
- Assumed office January 3, 2021
- Preceded by: Martha Roby
- Constituency: 2nd district (2021–2025); 1st district (2025–present)

Member of the Alabama House of Representatives from the 91st district
- In office November 3, 2010 – November 7, 2018
- Preceded by: Terry Spicer
- Succeeded by: Rhett Marques

Personal details
- Born: Felix Barry Moore; September 26, 1966 (age 60) Coffee County, Alabama, U.S.
- Party: Republican
- Spouse: Heather Hopper (m. 1992)
- Children: 4
- Education: Enterprise State Community College (AS); Troy University (attended); Auburn University (BS)
- Website: House website Campaign website
- Moore's voice Moore questions a witness on reduced recidivism rates. Recorded November 7, 2023

Felix Barry Moore (born September 26, 1966) is an American politician who is a United States senator-elect from Alabama. A member of the Republican Party, he has served as the U.S. representative for Alabama's 1st congressional district since 2025. The district includes Baldwin, Coffee, Covington, Dale, Escambia, Geneva, Henry, and Houston Counties, as well as most of Mobile County. From 2010 to 2018, Moore represented the 91st district in the Alabama House of Representatives.

Moore was first elected to the U.S. House of Representatives in 2020, having previously run for the seat as a primary challenger in 2018, and was reelected in 2022. In 2024, court-ordered redistricting placed him and fellow U.S. Representative Jerry Carl into the same district, forcing an incumbent-on-incumbent Republican primary. Moore narrowly won the nomination in the new district and was reelected in 2024.

Moore won the 2026 United States Senate election in Alabama, succeeding retiring incumbent Tommy Tuberville and defeating Democratic nominee Everett Wess.

== Early life and education ==
Moore was born in Coffee County, Alabama, on September 26, 1966. He grew up on a farm in Coffee County, and attended Enterprise State Community College. He later attended Auburn University, where he received a Bachelor of Science degree in agricultural science in 1992. While attending Auburn, Moore enlisted in the Alabama National Guard.

== Early career ==
In 1998, Moore founded Barry Moore Industries, a waste hauling company.

=== Alabama House of Representatives ===
Moore entered politics in 2010 at the urging of then-chair of the Alabama Republican Party Mike Hubbard. Moore was elected to the Alabama House of Representatives in 2010, defeating Democratic incumbent Terry Spicer.

In April 2014, Moore was arrested for felony perjury and lying to authorities during a grand jury investigation into Hubbard. Moore was recorded threatening another candidate for his seat, Josh Pipkin, allegedly at Hubbard's behest. Moore told Pipkin that Hubbard would eliminate a job incentive program in Enterprise, Alabama, and bring "holy hell" on Pipkin if he did not end his campaign. Moore was acquitted of all charges.

== U.S. House of Representatives (2021-present) ==
=== Elections ===
==== 2018 ====
In 2018, Moore challenged incumbent U.S. Representative Martha Roby in the Republican primary for AL-02, placing third behind Roby and former U.S. Representative Bobby Bright.

==== 2020 ====
Moore again sought the nomination in 2020. The seat was open after Roby opted not to run for a sixth term. Moore placed second in the seven-way Republican primary, the real contest in the heavily Republican district, trailing Dothan businessman Jeff Coleman. He then defeated Coleman in the runoff, which had been delayed almost three months due to the COVID-19 pandemic. In that time, Coleman's campaign faltered, and Moore eventually won. He defeated Democratic nominee Phyllis Harvey-Hall in the general election with 65.2% of the vote.

==== 2022 ====
Moore ran for reelection in 2022. In the Republican primary, Moore initially faced a challenge from Jeff Coleman, who announced another bid for the second congressional district. But a federal panel ruled against Coleman's candidacy, as he had qualified to run after the first deadline passed, and the decision implementing a second deadline was reversed. This left Moore unopposed in the Republican primary. In the general election, Moore defeated Democratic nominee Phyllis Harvey-Hall in a rematch with 69% of the vote.

==== 2024 ====
In 2024, redistricting as a result of Allen v. Milligan placed Moore into Alabama's 1st congressional district, which was represented by Jerry Carl, setting up a primary in which Moore and Carl were pitted against each other in the 1st district. On October 30, 2023, Moore confirmed to 1819 News that he would run in the first congressional district, challenging Carl in the Republican primary.

On March 5, 2024, Moore narrowly won the primary, despite running in a district that was geographically more Carl's than his. The new 1st retained 60% of Carl’s constituents.

In October 2024, The Washington Post reported that the Chinese government was using its Spamouflage influence operation to target Moore with accusations that he won his primary because of "the bloody Jewish consortium" and to call him a "Jewish dog", among other antisemitic tropes. Moore has been critical of the Chinese Communist Party, and has directed support for Taiwanese independence. He is not Jewish.

=== Tenure ===
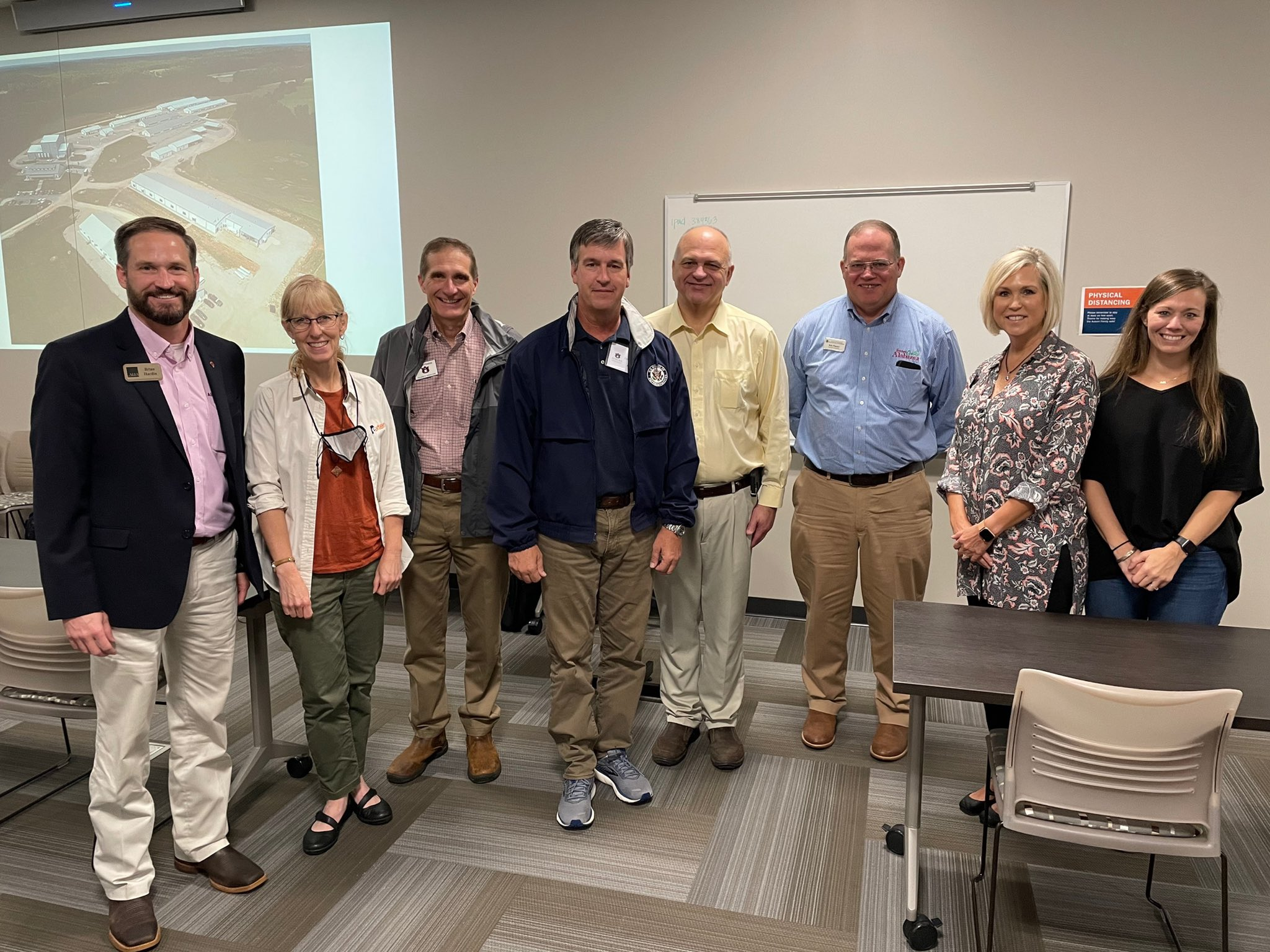
Moore visiting Auburn Agriculture in Auburn, Alabama on September 16, 2021

On January 6, 2021, Moore objected to the certification of the 2020 U.S. presidential election results in Congress. On January 7, he was one of 147 Republican lawmakers who voted to overturn results in the election, immediately after the storming of the U.S. Capitol. On January 10, Moore drew criticism for two posts on his personal Twitter account, one of which echoed the false claim of "stealing an election on November 3rd". Moore also posted about the killing of Ashli Babbitt, saying that a black officer shooting a white female veteran "doesn't fit the narrative". Twitter temporarily suspended his account; in response, Moore deactivated the account, alleging censorship of conservative voices. His official government Twitter account was unaffected.

In February 2021, Moore voted against the American Rescue Plan, calling it a "blue state bailout". The same month, he co-signed Bob Good's Right To Earn A Living Act, which would make state and local governments that implement pandemic-related stay-at-home orders ineligible for funding through the Coronavirus Relief Fund.

In March 2021, during a House vote on a measure condemning the Myanmar coup d'état that overwhelmingly passed, Moore was one of 14 House Republicans to vote against it.

In June 2021, Moore was one of 21 House Republicans to vote against a resolution to give the Congressional Gold Medal to police officers who defended the U.S. Capitol on January 6.

In June 2021, Moore was one of 49 House Republicans to vote to repeal the AUMF against Iraq.

In July 2021, Moore voted against the bipartisan ALLIES Act, which would increase by 8,000 the number of special immigrant visas for allies of the U.S. military during its invasion of Afghanistan, while also reducing some application requirements that caused long application backlogs; the bill passed in the House 407–16. In August 2021, after the Taliban gained control of Afghanistan, Moore called the American withdrawal from Afghanistan "a painful betrayal of our Afghan allies".

As of January 2022, Moore had voted in line with Joe Biden's stated position 6% of the time.

In February 2023, Moore introduced a bill, co-sponsored by Andrew Clyde, Lauren Boebert, and George Santos, to designate the "AR-15-style rifle" the National Gun of the United States.

During a town hall meeting in Daphne, Alabama on August 27, 2025, Moore was booed and heckled by his constituents and left abruptly out the back door without completing the town hall.

=== Committee assignments ===
For the 119th Congress:

- Committee on Agriculture
  - Subcommittee on Forestry and Horticulture (Vice Chair)
  - Subcommittee on General Farm Commodities, Risk Management, and Credit
  - Subcommittee on Livestock, Dairy, and Poultry
- Committee on the Judiciary
  - Subcommittee on Crime and Federal Government Surveillance
  - Subcommittee on Immigration Integrity, Security, and Enforcement
  - Subcommittee on Oversight

=== Caucus memberships ===
- Sunset and Repeal Caucus (Founder)
- Congressional Peanut Caucus (Co-Chair)
- Freedom Caucus
- Congressional Western Caucus
- Republican Study Committee
  - Messaging Task Force (Southern Region)
- House Republican Israel Caucus

== U.S. Senate ==
=== Elections ===
==== 2026 ====
Moore won the 2026 United States Senate election in Alabama, succeeding retiring incumbent Tommy Tuberville and defeating Democratic nominee Everett Wess.

== Political positions ==
=== Abortion ===
Moore supported the 2022 overturning of Roe v. Wade, calling it "a huge victory for the pro-life movement and the Constitution".

=== Debt ceiling ===
Moore was among the 71 Republicans who voted against final passage of the Fiscal Responsibility Act of 2023 in the House. He was also one of three members of Alabama's House delegation to vote against the bill, along with Dale Strong and Gary Palmer.

=== Israel ===
Moore voted in favor of the Israel Security Supplemental Appropriations Act, 2024, which would continue to provide Israel with military support during the Gaza war while also providing humanitarian aid to Palestinian civilians. In a press release, he wrote: "We must stand with Israel and provide the support and resources necessary to rid the Middle East and the world of Hamas' terrorist regime. Any threat to Israel is a threat to the United States and our freedoms."

=== Sharia ===
Like Tuberville, Moore has adopted anti-Muslim rhetoric. As a state representative in 2014, he said banning sharia (Islamic law) in Alabama was one of his top priorities. In 2026, Moore introduced the CRUSADE Act, which would require immigrants applying for a religious worker visa to explicitly disavow sharia. The title of the bill references the Crusades, a series of religious wars between Christians and Muslims. Moore has also joined the Sharia Free caucus and, alongside Tuberville, sponsored the Defeat Sharia Law in America Act. He has said: "We must be clear that Sharia law has no place in a nation built on Christian moral foundations, constitutional rights, and the rule of law. That's why I co-sponsored the No Sharia Act to preserve our constitutional and God-given rights. To allow otherwise would be to abandon the foundation of America."

=== Social Security ===
In November 2024, Moore voted for the Social Security Fairness Act, which allows people to receive full Social Security benefits in addition to any other benefits they may be entitled to.

=== Ukraine ===
Moore was one of 112 Republicans to vote against the Ukraine Security Supplemental Appropriations Act, 2024, which would continue to provide military, economic, and humanitarian aid to Ukraine during the Russo-Ukrainian War. In a press release, he wrote: "I oppose another blank check to Ukraine while we are $35 trillion in debt and our border has been overrun by more than nine million illegals. Americans are tired of being last on their government's list of priorities, and they deserve better."

== Electoral history ==
Electoral history of Barry Moore
Year	Office	Party	Primary						General			Result	Swing	Ref.
Year	Office	Party	Total	%	P.	Runoff	%	P.	Total	%	P.	Result	Swing	Ref.
2010	State Representative	Republican							9,754	64.31%	1st	Won	Gain	
2014	State Representative	Republican	3,905	55.46%	1st				7,484	96.27%	1st	Won	Hold	
2018	U.S. Representative	Republican	18,177	19.30%	3rd							Lost	N/A	
2020	U.S. Representative	Republican	21,354	20.45%	2nd	52,248	60.45%	1st	197,996	65.22%	1st	Won	Hold	
2022	U.S. Representative	Republican							137,460	69.09%	1st	Won	Hold	
2024	U.S. Representative	Republican	53,956	51.7%	1st				258,619	78.40%	1st	Won	Hold	

== Personal life ==
Moore married Heather Hopper in 1992; they have four children. The Moore family attend Hillcrest Baptist Church in Enterprise, Alabama.

U.S. House of Representatives
Preceded by Martha Roby	Member of the U.S. House of Representatives from Alabama's 2nd congressional district 2021–2025	Succeeded by Shomari Figures
Preceded by Jerry Carl	Member of the U.S. House of Representatives from Alabama's 1st congressional district 2025–present	Incumbent
Party political offices
Preceded by Tommy Tuberville	Republican nominee for U.S. Senator from Alabama (Class 2); 2026	Most recent
U.S. Senate
Preceded by Tommy Tuberville	United States Senator (Class 2) from Alabama; Taking office 2027; Served alongside: Katie Britt	Elect
U.S. order of precedence (ceremonial)
Preceded by Mariannette Miller-Meeks	United States representatives by seniority 266th	Succeeded by Blake Moore
