= Ralph Burke =

American politician

Member of the Alabama House of Representatives from the 24th district
- In office November 3, 1982 – November 4, 1998
- Succeeded by: Todd Greeson

Personal details
- Born: April 10, 1960 Rainsville, Alabama
- Died: July 3, 2025 (aged 65) Gadsden, Alabama
- Party: Democratic

Ralph Burke (April 10, 1960 – July 3, 2025) was an American politician who served in the Alabama House of Representatives from the 24th district from 1982 to 1998.

He died on July 3, 2025, in Gadsden, Alabama at age 65.
