= Dickie Drake =

American politician from Alabama

Member of the Alabama House of Representatives from the 45th district
- In office November 30, 2011 – November 9, 2022
- Preceded by: Owen Drake
- Succeeded by: Susan DuBose

Personal details
- Born: April 2, 1946 (age 80) Leeds, Alabama
- Party: Republican

Dickie Drake (born April 2, 1946) is an American politician who served in the Alabama House of Representatives from the 45th district from 2011 to 2022. He served in the United States Air Force for 42 years.
