= Tracy Estes =

American politician

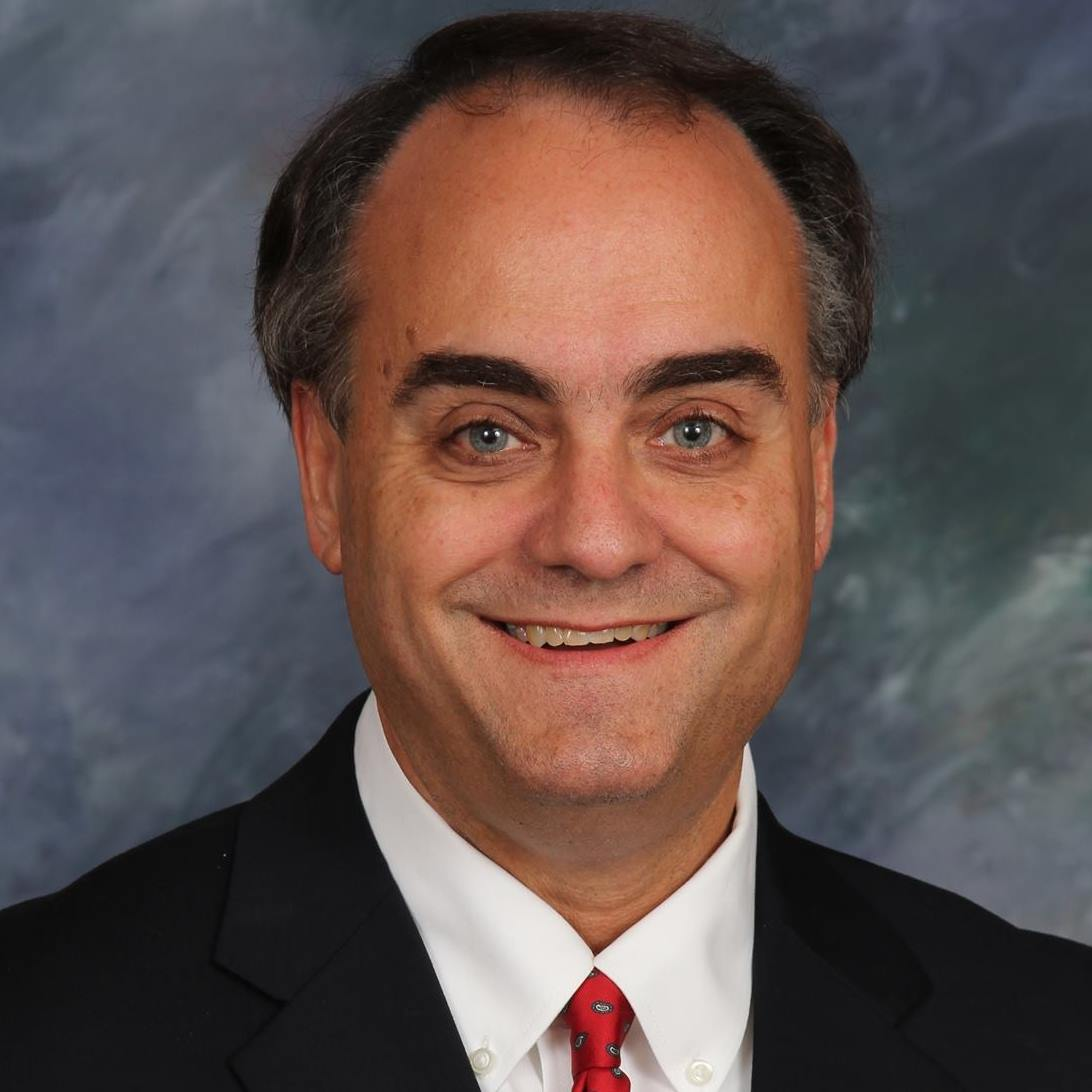

Member of the Alabama House of Representatives from the 17th district
- Incumbent
- Assumed office November 6, 2018
- Preceded by: Mike Millican
- Succeeded by: Phil Segraves (elect)

Personal details
- Born: John Tracy Estes; June 20, 1967 (age 59)
- Party: Republican
- Spouse: Tawanna (December 1988)
- Children: 2

John Tracy Estes is an American politician from the state of Alabama. He currently represents Alabama's 17th District in the Alabama House of Representatives as a member of the Republican Party.

== Education ==
Estes graduated from the University of Alabama with a bachelor's degree in news editorial journalism in 1989.

== Career ==
After graduating from the University of Alabama in 1989, Estes began working as an employee as the Tuscaloosa News. After a year of working at the Tuscaloosa News, he took a new job with the Montgomery Advertiser Sports Department. In 1991, he quit to take a news editor position at the Journal Record Newspaper, Marion County. He worked as an editor for 27 years before retiring to run for office. During his time as an editor, Estes became a member of the Marion County Republican Party. Estes was also a member of the Alabama Association of School Boards Board of Directors and Winfield Chamber of Commerce. During his time as a legislator, Estes won the Legislative Award from the Alabama Association of School Boards Board of Directors. Estes narrowly defeated his 2018 Republican primary opponent, Phil Segraves, by 139 votes after being endorsed by the Conservation Alabama Action Fund. Estes then ran unopposed and won the 2018 General Election with 98.8% of the vote.

=== Committee Positions ===
Estes is a member of the Education Policy, Public Safety and Homeland Security, and Children and Senior Advocacy Committees

== 2024 arrest and protective order ==
On September 20, 2024, Estes was arrested on a misdemeanor charge of third degree harassment following a verbal disagreement with his wife. The charge was later dismissed.

== Elections ==
=== Alabama House of Representatives District 17 ===
==== 2018 Republican Primary ====
2018 Republican Primary
Party	Candidate	Votes	%
Republican	Tracy Estes	4,293	44.1%
Republican	Phil Segraves	3,062	31.4%
Republican	David Hall	2,389	24.5%
Total votes		9,744	100.0%

==== 2018 Republican Runoff ====
2018 Republican Primary
Party	Candidate	Votes	%
Republican	Tracy Estes	3,871	50.9%
Republican	Phil Segraves	3,732	49.1%
Total votes		7,603	100.0%

==== 2018 General Election ====
2018 General Election
Party	Candidate	Votes	%
Republican	Tracy Estes	12,158	98.8%
Write-in		151	1.2%
Total votes		12,309	100.0%
