= Phil Segraves =

American politician

Member-elect of the Alabama House of Representatives from the 17th district
- Assuming office November 3, 2026
- Succeeding: Tracy Estes

Personal details
- Party: Republican

Phil Segraves is an American politician. A member of the Republican Party, he is the member-elect for the 17th district of the Alabama House of Representatives.
