= Allen Layson =

American politician

Member of the Alabama House of Representatives from the 61st district
- In office November 5, 1986 – November 8, 2006
- Succeeded by: Alan Harper

Personal details
- Born: December 16, 1931 Eatonton, Georgia
- Died: January 5, 2007 (aged 75) Reform, Alabama
- Party: Democratic

Allen Layson (December 16, 1931 – January 5, 2007) was an American politician who served in the Alabama House of Representatives from the 61st district from 1986 to 2006.

He died of ALS on January 5, 2007, in Reform, Alabama at age 75.
