= Jack Venable =

American politician

Member of the Alabama House of Representatives from the 31st district
- In office November 6, 1974 – November 18, 2005
- Succeeded by: Barry Mask

Personal details
- Born: February 25, 1939 Wetumpka, Alabama
- Died: November 18, 2005 (aged 66) Tallassee, Alabama
- Party: Democratic

Jack Venable (February 25, 1939 – November 18, 2005) was an American politician who served in the Alabama House of Representatives from the 31st district from 1974 to until his death in 2005.

He died of leukemia on November 18, 2005, in Tallassee, Alabama at age 66.
