= Mike Holmes (politician) =

American politician

Member of the Alabama House of Representatives from the 31st district
- In office January 30, 2014 – November 9, 2022
- Preceded by: Barry Mask
- Succeeded by: Troy Stubbs

Personal details
- Born: James Michael Holmes; March 8, 1942 (age 84) Crenshaw County, Alabama, United States
- Party: Republican
- Education: Troy University
- Profession: real estate broker, teacher, agri-business executive

James Michael Holmes (born March 8, 1942) is an American politician. He was a member of the Alabama House of Representatives from the 31st District, serving from 2014 to 2021. He is a member of the Republican party.
