= Troy Stubbs =

American politician

Member of the Alabama House of Representatives from the 31st district
- Incumbent
- Assumed office November 9, 2022
- Preceded by: Mike Holmes

Personal details
- Born: Charleston, South Carolina
- Party: Republican
- Spouse: Jenny
- Children: 4
- Education: Bachelor of Science in Finance, Master's degree in sports administration, Master's degree in secondary mathematics
- Alma mater: United States Air Force Academy, University of Alabama, University of Louisville, Alabama State University
- Profession: Financial adviser

Troy Stubbs is an American politician who has served as a Republican member of the Alabama House of Representatives since November 8, 2022. He represents Alabama's 31st House district.

== Electoral history ==
Stubbs was elected on November 8, 2022, in the 2022 Alabama House of Representatives election unopposed. He assumed office the next day on November 9, 2022. He was elected to the Elmore County Commission twice, in 2016 and in 2020.

== Biography ==
Stubbs was born in Charleston, South Carolina. He attended the United States Air Force Academy for three semesters before dropping out to go on a two-year mission for the Church of Jesus Christ of Latter Day Saints in the area of Europe East in St. Petersburg, Russia. He has a Bachelor of Science in Finance from the University of Alabama, a Master's degree in sports administration from the University of Louisville, and a Master's degree in secondary mathematics from Alabama State University His father was a Football Coach for the University of Alabama.

Alabama House of Representatives
Preceded by Mike Holmes	Member of the Alabama House of Representatives; 2022–present	Succeeded by incumbent
