= Jeanette Greene =

American politician

Member of the Alabama House of Representatives from the 96th district
- In office 1998–2002
- Preceded by: Mike Box
- Succeeded by: Randy Davis

Personal details
- Born: 1939 or 1940 (age 86–87)
- Party: Republican

Jeanette Greene (born 1939 or 1940) is an American politician. She served one term in the Alabama House of Representatives as a Republican, representing the 96th district.

== Biography ==
Greene worked as an English and journalism teacher for 33 years, largely at Satsuma High School in Satsuma, Alabama. She retired from teaching in 1997. In 1998, she ran for office, narrowly defeating Howard Hill in the primary election for the Republican nomination for District 96. She defeated Democratic challenger Tonia Eason in the general election that November. At the time of her election, she lived in Saraland, Alabama. During her time in the House, she served on the House Committees for Elections and Education. She ran for re-election in 2002, but lost in the primary to Randy Davis.
