= Susan DuBose =

American politician

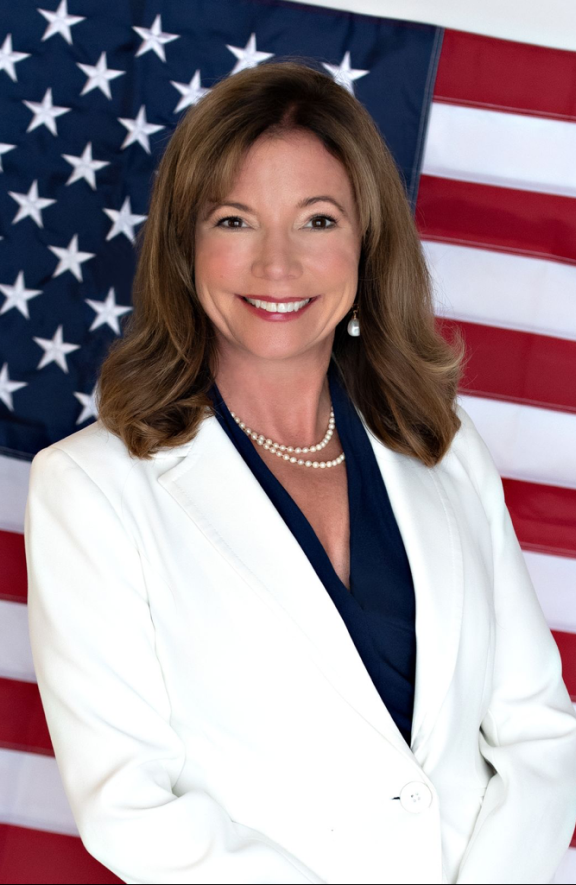

Member of the Alabama House of Representatives from the 45th district
- Incumbent
- Assumed office November 9, 2022
- Preceded by: Dickie Drake

Personal details
- Born: Biloxi, Mississippi
- Party: Republican
- Spouse: Dennis DuBose
- Children: 2
- Education: Master of Business Administration, Bachelor's degree
- Alma mater: University of South Alabama; Spring Hill College

Susan DuBose is an American politician who has served as a Republican member of the Alabama House of Representatives since November 8, 2022. She represents Alabama's 45th House district.

== Electoral history ==
She was elected on November 8, 2022, in the 2022 Alabama House of Representatives election against Libertarian opponent Kari Whitaker. She assumed office the next day on November 9, 2022.

== Biography ==
DuBose is a retired banker. She is a Methodist. She was born in Biloxi, Mississippi. She got her Bachelor's degree at the University of South Alabama in 1985, and a Master of Business Administration from Spring Hill College.

Alabama House of Representatives
Preceded by Dickie Drake	Member of the Alabama House of Representatives; 2022–present	Succeeded by incumbent
