= Tim Wadsworth =

American politician

Member of the Alabama House of Representatives from the 14th district
- Incumbent
- Assumed office November 5, 2014
- Preceded by: Richard Baughn

Personal details
- Born: Timothy Ray Wadsworth; June 3, 1957 (age 69)
- Party: Republican

Timothy Ray Wadsworth (born June 3, 1957) is an American politician who has served in the Alabama House of Representatives from the 14th district since 2014.
