= Bill Roberts (Alabama politician) =

American politician

Member of the Alabama House of Representatives from the 13th district
- In office 2010–2014
- Preceded by: Tommy Sherer
- Succeeded by: Connie Rowe

Personal details
- Born: December 29, 1946 (age 79) Jasper, Alabama, U.S.
- Party: Republican
- Spouse: Sandra
- Children: one
- Education: University of Alabama

William Roberts (born December 29, 1946) is an American politician in the state of Alabama. He served in the Alabama House of Representatives from 2010 to 2014. He was the Assistant State Commissioner of Labor in Alabama from 1972 to 1976. He ran unsuccessfully for the Alabama Senate District 32 in 2018.
