= Richard Baughn =

American politician

Member of the Alabama House of Representatives from the 14th district
- In office November 3, 2010 – November 5, 2014
- Preceded by: Ken Guin
- Succeeded by: Tim Wadsworth

Personal details
- Born: June 9, 1958 (age 68)
- Party: Republican

Richard Baughn (born June 9, 1958) is an American politician who served in the Alabama House of Representatives from the 14th district from 2010 to 2014.
