= Tommy Sherer =

American politician

Member of the Alabama House of Representatives from the 13th district
- In office 2002–2010
- Succeeded by: Bill Roberts

Personal details
- Born: November 11, 1948 (age 76); Jasper, Alabama, U.S.
- Political party: Democratic
- Spouse: Jeannette
- Children: two
- Education: Jacksonville State University, University of Alabama Birmingham, Samford University
- Profession: educator

Thomas L. Sherer (born November 11, 1948) is an American politician in the state of Alabama. He served in the Alabama House of Representatives from 2002 to 2010.
