= Kurt Wallace =

American politician

Member of the Alabama House of Representatives from the 42nd district
- Incumbent
- Assumed office November 3, 2010
- Preceded by: James Martin

Personal details
- Born: July 17, 1957 (age 69) Maplesville, Alabama, U.S.
- Spouse: Connie Wallace

Kurt Wallace (born July 17, 1957) is an American Republican politician. He is a member of the Alabama House of Representatives, being first elected in 2010.

He also was Mayor of Maplesville from 2008 to 2010.
