= Barry Mask =

American politician

Member of the Alabama House of Representatives from the 31st district
- In office March 1, 2006 – September 30, 2013
- Preceded by: Jack Venable
- Succeeded by: Mike Holmes

Personal details
- Born: Charles Barrett Mask; July 25, 1959 (age 66) Alexander City, Alabama
- Party: Republican

Barry Mask (born July 25, 1959) is an American politician who served in the Alabama House of Representatives from the 31st district from 2006 to 2013.
