= Alvin Holmes =

American politician (1939–2020)

Member of the Alabama House of Representatives from the 78th district
- In office 1974–2018

Personal details
- Born: October 26, 1939 Montgomery, Alabama, U.S.
- Died: November 21, 2020 (aged 81) Montgomery, Alabama, U.S.
- Party: Democratic
- Education: Alabama State University; Faulkner University
- Profession: real estate broker, professor

Alvin Adolf Holmes (October 26, 1939 – November 21, 2020) was an American politician who served as a member of the Alabama House of Representatives from the 78th District from 1974 to 2018. He was a member of the Democratic Party and was African American.

Alvin Holmes was an Alabama Delegate to the 1968 Democratic National Convention and again to the 1996 Democratic National Convention.

He campaigned to remove the Confederate flag from Alabama's capitol.

Holmes died on November 21, 2020, at the age of 81.
