= Mac Buttram =

American politician

Member of the Alabama House of Representatives from the 12th district
- In office November 3, 2010 – November 5, 2014
- Preceded by: James C. Fields
- Succeeded by: Corey Harbison

Personal details
- Born: July 5, 1947 (age 79)
- Party: Republican

Mac Buttram (born July 5, 1947) is an American politician who served in the Alabama House of Representatives from the 12th district from 2010 to 2014.
