= Greg Canfield =

American politician (born 1960)

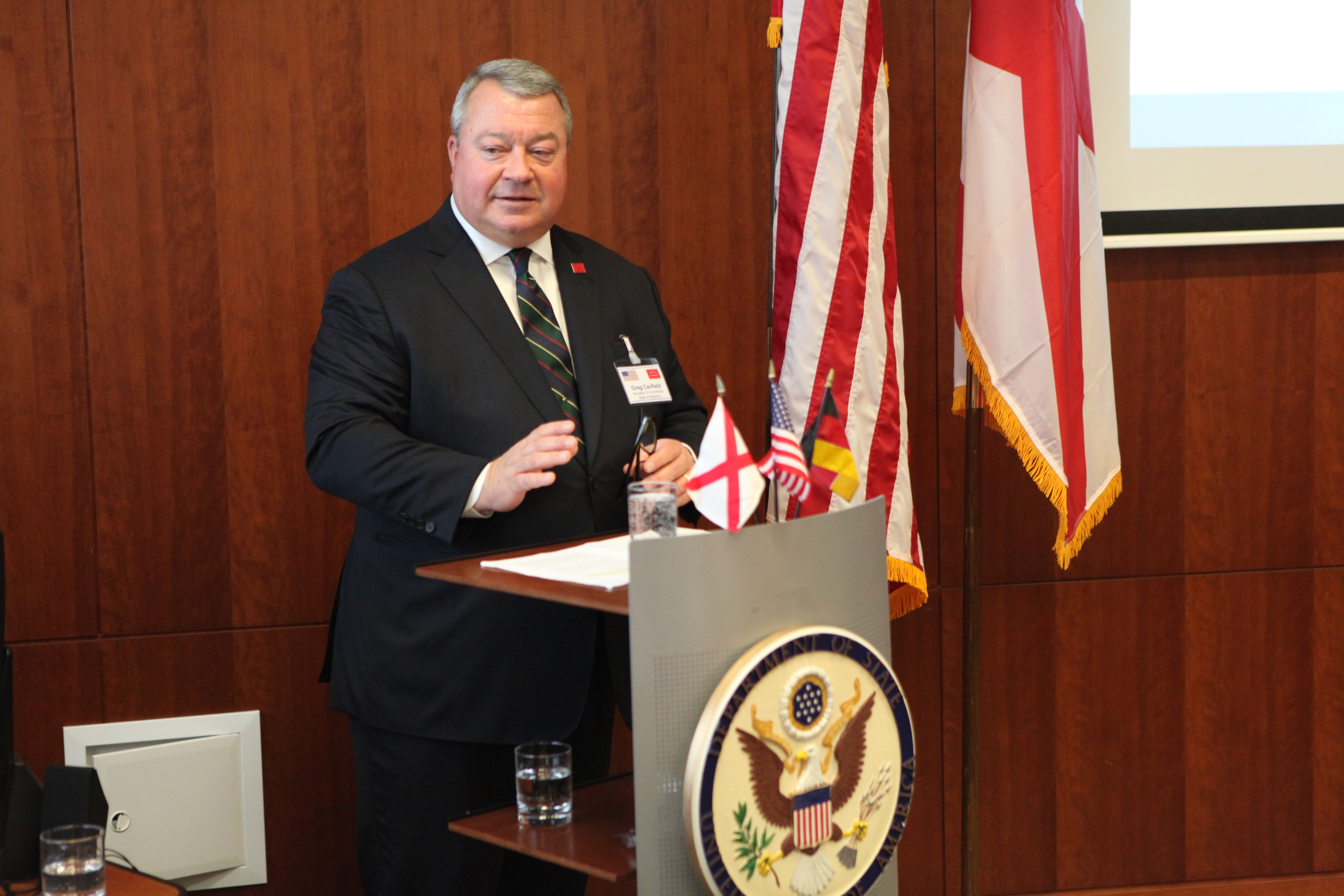
Greg Canfield (2017)

John Gregory Canfield (born July 12, 1960) is an American politician from the state of Alabama. From 2011 to 2024, he served as the Secretary of Commerce for the State of Alabama.

Canfield was elected the Alabama House of Representatives in the 2006 elections. He was re-elected in 2010. Governor Robert J. Bentley appointed Canfield to the Alabama Development Office in July 2011, succeeding Seth Hammett.
