= Terry Spicer =

American politician

Member of the Alabama House of Representatives from the 91st district
- In office November 4, 1998 – November 3, 2010
- Preceded by: Garreth Moore
- Succeeded by: Barry Moore

Personal details
- Born: September 17, 1965 (age 60) Opp, Alabama, U.S.
- Party: Democratic

Terry Spicer (born September 17, 1965) is an American politician who served in the Alabama House of Representatives from the 91st district from 1998 to 2010.

In 2010, Spicer pled guilty to accepting monthly bribes from gambling developer Ronnie Gilley and lobbyist Jarrod Massey. He was found guilty of accepting bribes, forced to resign his position, and sentenced to 57 months in prison.
