= Ken Johnson (Alabama politician) =

American politician

Member of the Alabama House of Representatives from the 7th district
- In office 2010–2018
- Preceded by: Jody Letson
- Succeeded by: Proncey Robertson

Personal details
- Party: Republican
- Profession: Businessman

Ken Johnson is an American politician. He was a member of the Alabama House of Representatives 7th District, serving from 2010 to 2018. He is a member of the Republican party.
