= Lesley Vance (politician) =

American politician

Member of the Alabama House of Representatives from the 80th district
- In office 2006–2015
- Succeeded by: Chris Blackshear

Personal details
- Born: October 23, 1939 Pike County, Alabama, U.S.
- Died: November 3, 2015 (aged 76) Columbus, Georgia, U.S.
- Party: Republican (2010–2015); Democratic (1994–2010)
- Profession: Funeral director, former coroner

Lesley Vance (October 23, 1939 – November 3, 2015) was an American politician.

Born in Phenix City, Alabama, Vance owned a funeral home. He served as county commissioner for Russell County, Alabama and was a member of the Alabama House of Representatives from 1994 to his death in 2015. He was a member of the Democratic Party but switched to the Republican Party about two weeks after the November, 2010 general election.

Vance died at a hospice in Columbus, Georgia on November 3, 2015, from colon cancer at the age of 76.
