= Richard Laird =

American politician (1939–2020)

Member of the Alabama House of Representatives from the 37th district
- In office November 9, 1983 – November 5, 2014
- Preceded by: C. Howard Nevett
- Succeeded by: Bob Fincher

Member of the Alabama House of Representatives from the 61st district
- In office November 8, 1978 – November 9, 1983
- Preceded by: Monroe Smith
- Succeeded by: Bryant Melton

Personal details
- Born: Richard Joel Laird; July 4, 1939 Rome, Georgia, U.S.
- Died: December 14, 2020 (aged 81) Carrollton, Georgia, U.S.
- Party: Independent (2013–2020)
- Other political affiliations: Democratic (before 2013)

Richard Joel Laird Sr. (July 4, 1939 – December 14, 2020) was an American politician who served in the Alabama House of Representatives from 1978 to 2014.

== Biography ==
Laird was born in Floyd County, Georgia, and graduated from Handley High School in Roanoke, Alabama. He was a businessman in Roanoke, Alabama, and in Randolph County, Alabama. He served on the Roanoke City Council from 1972 to 1976.

He died from COVID-19 in Carrollton, Georgia, on December 14, 2020, at age 81, during the COVID-19 pandemic in Georgia (U.S. state).
