= Todd Greeson =

American politician

Member of the Alabama House of Representatives from the 24th district
- In office November 4, 1998 – 2014
- Preceded by: Ralph Burke
- Succeeded by: Nathaniel Ledbetter

Personal details
- Born: March 7, 1971 (age 55)
- Party: Republican
- Education: Troy University; Athens State University
- Profession: Administrator for business and industry
- Website: VoteToddGreeson.com

Todd Greeson (born March 7, 1971) was a Republican member of the Alabama State House of Representatives. Greeson was first elected in 1998 when he defeated incumbent Democrat Ralph Burke. He did not seek re-election in 2014, instead opting to run for the open State Senate seat in District 8. He lost in the Republican primary.

Greeson holds bachelor's degrees in political science and business administration from Athens State University. Greeson received his master's degree in public administration in 2007 from Troy University. He works in the department of Workforce Development at Northeast Alabama Community College.
