= Jim Patterson (Alabama politician) =

American businessman and politician

Member of the Alabama House of Representatives from the 21st district
- In office November 2, 2010 – October 2, 2017
- Preceded by: Randy Hinshaw
- Succeeded by: Rex Reynolds

Personal details
- Born: April 2, 1950 Huntsville, Alabama
- Died: October 2, 2017 (aged 67) Meridianville, Alabama
- Party: Republican
- Spouse: Susan Carter
- Children: 3
- Profession: Businessman

James Malcom Patterson Jr. (April 2, 1950 – October 2, 2017) was an American businessman and politician.

Patterson was born in Huntsville, Alabama. In 1972, he received his bachelor's degree in business from the Jacksonville State University. Patterson served in the United States Army and was commissioned a captain. Patterson was involved in the real estate business. Patterson served on the Morgan County, Alabama School Board from 1988 to 2000. He lived with his family in Meridianville, Alabama. He had been a member of the Alabama House of Representatives from the 21st District, serving from 2010 until his death in 2017. He was a member of the Republican party. In 2017, Patterson died of a heart attack while still in office.
