= Blaine Galliher =

American politician

Member of the Alabama House of Representatives from the 30th district
- In office November 9, 1994 – July 31, 2012
- Succeeded by: Mack Butler

Personal details
- Born: January 13, 1949 (age 77) Abingdon, Virginia
- Party: Republican

Blaine Galliher (born January 13, 1949) is an American politician who served in the Alabama House of Representatives from the 30th district from 1994 to 2012.
