= Johnny Mack Morrow =

American politician (born 1942)

Member of the Alabama House of Representatives from the 18th district
- In office 1990–2018
- Succeeded by: Jamie Kiel

Personal details
- Born: November 25, 1942 (age 83) Vina, Alabama, United States
- Party: Democratic

Johnny Mack Morrow (born November 25, 1942, in Vina, Al) is an American Democratic politician. From 1990 to 2018, he was a member of the Alabama House of Representatives for the 18th district. He resides in Red Bay, Alabama.
