= Randy Hinshaw =

American politician

Member of the Alabama House of Representatives from the 21st district
- In office November 6, 2002 – November 3, 2010
- Preceded by: Patrick Jones
- Succeeded by: Jim Patterson
- In office November 9, 1994 – November 4, 1998
- Succeeded by: Patrick Jones

Personal details
- Born: March 29, 1960 (age 66) Huntington Park, California
- Party: Democratic

Randy Hinshaw (born March 29, 1960) is an American politician who served in the Alabama House of Representatives from the 21st district from 1994 to 1998 and from 2002 to 2010.
