= Yvonne Kennedy =

American politician (1945–2012)

Member of the Alabama House of Representatives
- In office April 1979 – December 2012

Personal details
- Born: January 8, 1945 Mobile, Alabama, US
- Died: December 8, 2012 (aged 67) Birmingham, Alabama
- Party: Democratic
- Education: Bishop State Community College; Alabama State University; Morgan State University
- Profession: College president

Yvonne Kennedy (January 8, 1945 – December 8, 2012) was an American politician and college president. She served in the Alabama House of Representatives for more than thirty years and was president of Bishop State Community College. She was also a national president of Delta Sigma Theta sorority.

== Early life ==
Kennedy was born in Mobile, Alabama on January 8, 1945. Her parents were Leroy and Thelma Kennedy.

She attended Bishop State Community College where she received an associate degree. She then attended Alabama State University, graduating with a B.S. While at Alabama State, she became a member of Delta Sigma Theta sorority in 1964.

Next, Kennedy went to Morgan State University, receiving a M.A. She received a doctorate in higher education administration at Alabama State University in 1979.

== Career ==
Kennedy was a federal grants officer at Bishop State Community College. She became the college's second president in 1981. She resigned from that position in 2007 amidst a scandal regarding alleged embezzlement by several other college employees. Under her leadership, the college added new campuses and expanded its health care and technology programs.

In April 1979, she won a special election and became the representative of Mobile in the Alabama House of Representatives. She was reelected in 2006 and 2010. She worked with and was the chair of the Alabama Legislative Black Caucus. Many of her activities in the legislature related to education, including securing funding for kindergarten, standardized testing, and better funding for public schools. She fought against voter identification laws and supported voter rights for ex-felons. She served in the legislature until she died in 2012. She was a Democrat.

She served on the American Association for Higher Education Board.

== Honors ==
Kennedy received an Honorary Doctor of Letters from Lane College.

== Personal life ==
Kennedy served as national president of Delta Sigma Theta sorority from 1988 to 1992. She was a trustee of Miles College and board member of the Junior Miss Scholarship Foundation Incorporated. She was a member of the Stewart Memorial Christian Methodist Episcopal Church in Mobile.

She died on December 8, 2012, at UAB Hospital in Birmingham, Alabama. She was buried in Oaklawn Cemetery in Mobile.
