= Mike Millican =

American politician

Member of the Alabama House of Representatives from the 17th district
- In office 1990–2018
- Succeeded by: Tracy Estes

Personal details
- Born: December 5, 1950 (age 75) Sulligent, Alabama, United States
- Party: Democratic (before 2010); Republican (2010-present)

Michael J. Millican (born December 5, 1950) was an American politician. He was a member of the Alabama House of Representatives from the 17th District, serving from 1990 to 2018. He is a member of the Republican party.
