= Alan Harper (politician) =

American politician (1957–2025)

Member of the Alabama House of Representatives from the 61st district
- In office 2006–2018
- Preceded by: Allen Layson
- Succeeded by: Rodney Sullivan

Personal details
- Born: November 9, 1957 Tuscaloosa County, Alabama, U.S.
- Died: December 18, 2025 (aged 68) Northport, Alabama, U.S.
- Party: Democratic (before 2012); Republican (2012–2025)

Samuel Alan Harper (November 9, 1957 – December 18, 2025) was an American politician. He served as a member of the Alabama House of Representatives from the 61st District, from 2006 to 2018. He was a member of the Republican Party, having swapped from the Democrats in 2012. Harper died in Northport, Alabama, on December 18, 2025, at the age of 68.
