= Owen Drake =

American politician

Owen Drake (1936 – June 27, 2011) was an American Republican politician.

A veteran of the United States Air Force, Drake served in the Alabama House of Representatives from 2006 until his death.
