= David Colston =

American politician

Member of the Alabama House of Representatives from the 69th district
- In office November 3, 2010 – November 5, 2014
- Preceded by: James Thomas
- Succeeded by: Kelvin Lawrence

Personal details
- Party: Democratic

David Colston is an American politician who served in the Alabama House of Representatives from the 69th district from 2010 to 2014.
