= Greg Wren =

American politician (born 1955)

Member of the Alabama House of Representatives from the 75th district
- In office November 8, 2006 – April 1, 2014
- Preceded by: Dick Brewbaker
- Succeeded by: Reed Ingram
- In office November 9, 1994 – November 6, 2002
- Preceded by: Claud Walker
- Succeeded by: Dick Brewbaker

Personal details
- Born: January 21, 1955 (age 71) Ithaca, New York
- Party: Republican

Gregory D. Wren (born January 21, 1955) is an American politician in the Republican Party who served in the Alabama House of Representatives from Montgomery in the 75th District from 1994 to 2002 and again from 2006 to 2014.

In 2013 he obtained confidential, non-public information and sold it to RxAlly, a national company that represented the interests of member pharmacies. In return for passing on privileged information, they paid him $24,000. He was charged with a violation of ethics and found guilty, forcing him to resign his House seat. He was then sentenced to twelve months in jail (suspended) and fined $24,000.
