= Randy Davis =

American politician

Member of the Alabama House of Representatives from the 96th district
- In office 2002–2019
- Preceded by: Jeanette Greene
- Succeeded by: Matt Simpson

Personal details
- Born: July 14, 1952 (age 74) Mobile, Alabama, U.S.
- Party: Republican
- Profession: businessman, professor, musical conductor

Randy Davis (born July 14, 1952) is an American politician. He is a former member of the Alabama House of Representatives from the 96th District, serving from 2002 to 2019. He is a member of the Republican Party.
