= Lawrence McAdory =

American politician (born 1929)

Member of the Alabama House of Representatives from the 56th district
- In office November 2009 – November 5, 2014
- Preceded by: Priscilla Dunn
- Succeeded by: Louise Alexander
- In office November 9, 1994 – November 4, 1998
- Preceded by: Bobbie McDowell
- Succeeded by: Priscilla Dunn

Personal details
- Born: June 21, 1929 (age 97) Bessemer, Alabama
- Party: Democratic

Lawrence McAdory (born June 21, 1929) is an American politician who served in the Alabama House of Representatives from the 56th district from 1994 to 1998 and from 2009 to 2014.
