= Jody Letson =

American politician

Member of the Alabama House of Representatives from the 7th district
- In office July 17, 1996 – November 3, 2010
- Preceded by: Sam Letson
- Succeeded by: Ken Johnson

Personal details
- Born: January 1, 1949 (age 77) Lawrence County, Alabama
- Party: Democratic

Jody Letson (born January 1, 1949) is an American politician who served in the Alabama House of Representatives from the 7th district from 1996 to 2010.
