= George Bandy =

American minister and politician (1945–2018)

Member of the Alabama House of Representatives from the 83rd district
- In office November 6, 1994 – January 16, 2018

Personal details
- Born: February 7, 1945
- Died: January 16, 2018 (aged 72) Macon, Georgia, U.S.
- Profession: Missionary Baptist minister

George Bandy (February 7, 1945 – January 16, 2018) was an American Baptist minister and politician.

Bandy lived in Opelika, Alabama. He received his bachelor's degree from Morehouse College. Bandy served as the pastor of the Saint James Missionary Baptist Church in Opelika, Alabama. He served on the Opelika City Council and was the president pro tempore. Bandy also served on the Lee County Commission. Bandy served in the Alabama House of Representatives from the 83rd District, from 1994 until his death in 2018. Bandy was involved with the Democratic party and served as chairman of the Alabama Democratic Conference. Bandy died on January 16, 2018, in a hospital in Macon, Georgia.
