= Spencer Collier =

American politician

Member of the Alabama House of Representatives from the 105th district
- In office 2002–2010
- Succeeded by: David Sessions

Personal details
- Born: March 27, 1973 (age 53)
- Party: Republican
- Spouse: Melissa
- Children: 4
- Profession: legal investigator, former Alabama State Trooper

Jack Spencer Collier (born March 27, 1973) is an American politician who served as a Republican member for the 105th district in the Alabama House of Representatives from 2002 to 2011. After two terms in the legislature, Collier was appointed as the state's Homeland Security Director by Governor Robert Bentley. In 2013, the Alabama Legislature passed a bill that consolidated law enforcement and public safety agencies. On April 5, 2013, after signing the bill into law, Collier was named to the cabinet position as the Secretary of Law Enforcement. In 2016, Collier was fired and accused of wrongdoing by Governor Bentley for refusing to lie to authorities about an ongoing affair between the then Governor and one of his top political advisors. Collier was exonerated and won a lawsuit against his accusers for an undisclosed amount. He served as the Police Chief in Selma, Alabama from January 2017 to June 2019. He was arrested again in 2019.
