= Mike Hubbard (politician) =

American politician (born 1962)

65th Speaker of the Alabama House of Representatives
- In office November 3, 2010 – June 10, 2016
- Preceded by: Seth Hammett
- Succeeded by: Victor Gaston (Acting)

Member of the Alabama House of Representatives from the 79th district
- In office 1998 – June 10, 2016
- Preceded by: Pete Turnham
- Succeeded by: Joe Lovvorn

Personal details
- Born: February 11, 1962 (age 64) Hartwell, Georgia, U.S.
- Party: Republican
- Spouse: Susan Hubbard
- Children: 2
- Education: University of Georgia (BA)
- Website: House website

Mike Hubbard (born February 11, 1962) is an American former state politician who was a Republican member of the Alabama House of Representatives, representing the 79th district in Lee County. He was first elected in 1998 and previously served as Speaker of the Alabama House of Representatives. Before that, he was House Minority Leader six years (2004–10) and was twice chairman of the Alabama Republican Party (2007–11).

== Early life and education ==
Hubbard was born and raised in Hartwell, Georgia. During high school, Hubbard beat Ralph Reed to become the Georgia state champion in the Voice of Democracy speech contest. Hubbard went to the University of Georgia on a journalism scholarship, where he helped lead the successful public relations campaign for Herschel Walker’s 1982 Heisman Trophy.

== Career ==
After graduating, Hubbard got a job in the Auburn University athletic department and led a successful public relations campaign for Bo Jackson’s 1985 Heisman candidacy. Hubbard left Auburn and started a new company, which then won exclusive broadcast rights for all Auburn Tigers sports and made Hubbard a millionaire. Prior to forming Auburn Network in 1994, he was a general manager of Host Communications (1990–1994), and associate sports information director for Auburn University (1984–1990).

His company, Auburn Network, owns and operates four radio stations in the Auburn/Opelika market and publishes a quarterly magazine, East Alabama Living. It also operates an advertising agency, Network Creative Media. His company sold the multi-media rights to Auburn University athletics to International Sports Properties in 2003, which merged with IMG's college sports marketing/broadcasting group in 2010.

=== Political career ===
In 1996, Patrick Nix, (Auburn's starting quarterback in 1994 and 1995), recommended that Hubbard apply his public relations expertise to Bob Riley’s congressional campaign. Riley won and, in gratitude, invited Hubbard to attend the swearing-in ceremony in the Alabama State Capitol, where Hubbard says he was impressed by the "symbols of our nation’s power."

In 1998, Bill Canary provided polling during Hubbard's first election campaign. Hubbard won, taking a seat in the Alabama House of Representatives representing much of Lee County, Alabama.

In 2002, Riley won the Alabama gubernatorial election, and gave Hubbard the leadership of the Alabama Republican Party. Hubbard would later name his youngest son Riley. As leader of the state's Republican party, Hubbard became a member of the Republican National Committee, and received invitations to visit the White House.

=== Arrest and conviction ===
In 2014, a special Grand Jury indicted Hubbard on 23 ethics related to use of his office for personal gain to land consulting contracts and investment help with a failing printing company. In 2016, Hubbard went to trial on those 23 ethic counts. Former Alabama Attorney General Bill Baxley served as Hubbard's main defense counsel.

Hubbard was convicted on 12 of the 23 charges. His conviction automatically expelled him as a member of the House. The Alabama Court of Criminal Appeals upheld 11 of the 12 convictions and the Alabama Supreme Court eventually overturned five of the other charges but upheld six.

On September 11, 2020, he reported to the Lee County Sheriff's Office to be taken into custody and turned over to the Alabama Department of Corrections to begin his term of imprisonment. Hubbard was released from prison on January 8, 2023.

Alabama House of Representatives
Preceded by Pete Turnham	Member of the Alabama House of Representatives from the 79th district 1998–2016	Succeeded by Joe Lovvorn
Preceded by Jim Carns	Minority Leader of the Alabama House of Representatives; 2004–2010	Succeeded by Craig Ford
Party political offices
Preceded by Twinkle Andress Cavanaugh	Chair of the Alabama Republican Party; 2007–2011	Succeeded by Bill Armistead
Political offices
Preceded by Seth Hammett	Speaker of the Alabama House of Representatives; 2010–2016	Succeeded by Mac McCutcheon
