= Arthur Payne (politician) =

American politician (born 1946)

Member of the Alabama House of Representatives from the 44th district
- In office January 3, 1984 – November 5, 2014
- Preceded by: Jarushia Thornton
- Succeeded by: Danny Garrett

Member of the Alabama House of Representatives from the 15th district
- In office November 6, 1978 – January 3, 1984
- Preceded by: Robert B. Hall
- Succeeded by: Earl Mitchell

Personal details
- Born: June 5, 1946 (age 80) Birmingham, Alabama, United States

Arthur Payne (born June 5, 1946) is an American Republican politician. He is a member of the Alabama House of Representatives from the 44th District, being first elected in 1978.
