= Mary Sue McClurkin =

American politician

Member of the Alabama House of Representatives from the 43rd district
- In office November 6, 2002 – November 5, 2014
- Preceded by: Allen Sanderson
- Succeeded by: Arnold Mooney

Member of the Alabama House of Representatives from the 40th district
- In office November 4, 1998 – November 6, 2002
- Preceded by: Al Knight
- Succeeded by: Lea Fite

Personal details
- Born: February 14, 1947 (age 79) Abbeville, Alabama
- Party: Republican

Mary Sue McClurkin (born February 14, 1947) is an American politician who served in the Alabama House of Representatives from 1998 to 2014.
