= Ken Guin =

American politician (born 1962)

Member of the Alabama House of Representatives from the 14th district
- In office 1994–2010
- Preceded by: Johnny Cagle
- Succeeded by: Richard Baughn

Personal details
- Born: January 23, 1962 (age 64) Carbon Hill, Alabama, United States
- Party: Democratic
- Profession: Lawyer

James Kenneth Guin Jr. (born January 23, 1962) is an American politician and lawyer. Guin was a member of the Alabama House of Representatives from the 14th District, serving from 1994 to 2010 with the following distinctions:

- He was Majority Leader of the Alabama House of Representatives from 1997 to 2010.
- He was Chair of the Committee on Constitutions and Election from 2001 - 2005 and
- Chair of the Committee on Rules from 2005 to 2010.

In 1991 he founded of Ken Guin Attorney at Law PC. Guin co-founded The Corridor Messenger, a weekly newspaper in Walker County, Alabama where he served as its first publisher and editor. He is a graduate of Auburn University with a BA in English and he holds a Juris Doctor degree from Samford University's Cumberland School of Law. He is a member of the Democratic party.
