= Reed Blankenship =

American football player (born 1999)

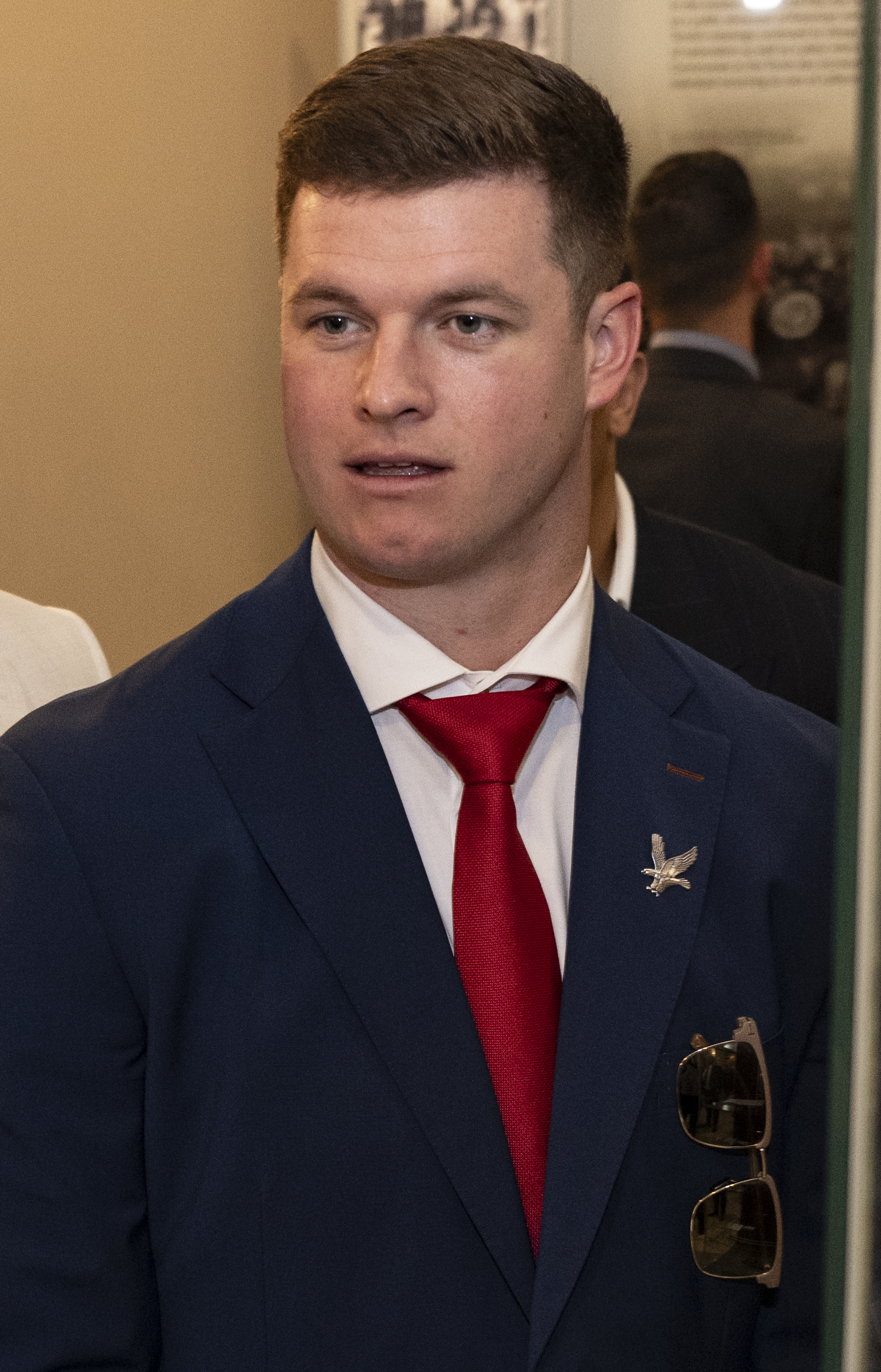
- Blankenship in 2025

No. 6 – Houston Texans
- Position: Safety
- Roster status: Active

Personal information
- Born: March 2, 1999 (age 27); Athens, Alabama, U.S.
- Listed height: 6 ft 1 in (1.85 m)
- Listed weight: 203 lb (92 kg)

Career information
- High school: West Limestone (Lester, Alabama)
- College: Middle Tennessee (2017–2021)
- NFL draft: 2022: undrafted

Career history
- Philadelphia Eagles (2022–2025); Houston Texans (2026–present)

Awards and highlights
- Super Bowl champion (LIX); First-team All-C-USA (2021)

Career NFL statistics as of Week 11, 2026
- Total tackles: 359
- Forced fumbles: 1
- Fumble recoveries: 3
- Pass deflections: 26
- Interceptions: 10
- Stats at Pro Football Reference

Reed Scott Blankenship (born March 2, 1999) is an American professional football safety for the Houston Texans of the National Football League (NFL). He played college football for the Middle Tennessee Blue Raiders and was signed by the Philadelphia Eagles as an undrafted free agent after the 2022 NFL draft.

== Early life ==
Blankenship was born on March 2, 1999, and grew up in Lester, Alabama. He attended West Limestone High School and played football and basketball. He was an all-state, all-region, all-county, and all-area selection in football and earned the Player of the Year award in 2016. He served as the team's captain in two seasons and finished his career with 3,192 rushing yards, 1,004 yards receiving, 1,056 yards passing and 46 total touchdowns. He was also a member of the 2015 4A State Championship basketball team as well as an all-area and all-county player in basketball.

After graduating from high school, Blankenship received scholarship offers from Middle Tennessee, Alabama A&M, Marist, Minnesota, Southern Miss, Georgia State, Tulane, Troy, Samford, Arkansas State, Western Carolina, Arkansas Tech, Mercer, UT Martin, and Central Arkansas.

== College career ==
Blankenship accepted the offer from Middle Tennessee and played in 13 games, nine as a starter, in his true freshman season (2017). He placed fourth on the team with 68 tackles and also made a sack and two interceptions, earning honorable mention all-conference and C-USA All-Freshman honors.

As a sophomore in 2018, Blankenship appeared in 13 games and started 12, making a team-leading and career-high 107 tackles along with four interceptions and seven passes defended. His four interceptions ranked 16th in the nation. Against Old Dominion on October 27, he made a sack, 17 tackles, 3 for loss and returned an interception 100 yards for a touchdown, earning the Bronko Nagurski National Defensive Player of the Week award and conference defensive player of the week honors. His interception return ranked number two on ESPN's top plays of the day list. At the end of the season, Blankenship was named first-team all-conference.

As a junior in 2019, Blankenship played in seven games before suffering a season-ending leg injury. A team captain, he compiled 58 tackles (fourth place on the team), two interceptions, three passes defended and a forced fumble before the injury. He also blocked two kicks, placing him first in the nation. Despite missing half the season, Blankenship was named second-team all-conference at the end of the year.

In 2020, Blankenship appeared in and started all nine games and made a team-leading 76 tackles. He was part of the Bednarik Award and Jim Thorpe Award watchlists. He was projected a mid-round pick for the 2021 NFL draft, but he decided to return for one more season at Middle Tennessee.

In 2021, as a fifth-year senior, Blankenship started all 13 games and was the school's leading tackler with 110 stops. He made three fumble recoveries which ranked third in the nation, and also placed eighth nationally in solo tackles per game with 5.8. He played 1,030 snaps which was more than any other player on the team. Against Marshall, Blankenship returned a fumble 90 yards for a touchdown and made a forced fumble, two recoveries and seven stops, being named the conference defensive player of the week for his efforts. Against Charlotte, he made 13 tackles and set the all-time Middle Tennessee tackles record. He was named a candidate for the Senior CLASS Award on October 6. At the end of the year, he was named first-team all-conference, C-USA all-academic, the conference Spirit Service Award winner, the Middle Tennessee Defensive Ironman of the Year and a selection to the East–West Shrine Bowl.

== Professional career ==
Pre-draft measurables
Height	Weight	Arm length	Hand span	Wingspan	40-yard dash	10-yard split	20-yard split	20-yard shuttle	Three-cone drill	Vertical jump	Broad jump	Bench press
6 ft 0 3/4 in (1.85 m)	203 lb (92 kg)	31 5/8 in (0.80 m)	9 3/8 in (0.24 m)	6 ft 4 1/4 in (1.94 m)	4.55 s	1.50 s	2.57 s	4.22 s	7.09 s	33.5 in (0.85 m)	10 ft 1 in (3.07 m)	15 reps
All values from Pro Day

=== Philadelphia Eagles ===
==== 2022 ====
Blankenship went undrafted in the 2022 NFL draft. On May 5, 2022, the Philadelphia Eagles signed Blankenship to a three–year, $2.56 million rookie contract as an undrafted free agent that included $55,000 guaranteed upon signing and an initial signing bonus of $5,000.

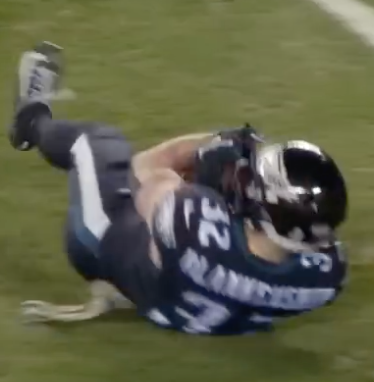
Blankenship records his first career interception in 2022

Throughout training camp, he competed for a roster spot as a backup safety and special teams player against Anthony Harris, Josiah Scott, Jaquiski Tartt, and Andre Chachere. Head coach Nick Sirianni named him a backup safety to begin the regular season, behind starting safeties C. J. Gardner-Johnson and Marcus Epps and primary backup safety K'Von Wallace. He was one of three 2022 undrafted players to make the Eagles' final roster, along with Josh Sills and Josh Jobe.

On October 9, 2022, Blankenship made his professional regular season debut and had two tackles during a 20–17 win at the Arizona Cardinals. On November 27, 2022, Blankenship saw his first significant playing time on defense after appearing mainly on special teams, but received increase playing time after C. J. Gardner-Johnson suffered an injury. He led the team with six combined tackles (three solo), had a pass deflection, and made his first career interception on Aaron Rodgers to tight end Tyler Davis during a 40-33 win against the Green Bay Packers. On December 3, 2022, the Eagles' defensive coordinator Jonathan Gannon named him the starting strong safety after placing C. J. Gardner-Johnson on injured reserve due to a lacerated kidney. On December 4, 2022, Blankenship earned his first career start in place of Gardner-Johnson and made three solo tackles and a pass deflection as the Eagles routed the Tennessee Titans 35–10. He was inactive for the Eagles' 25–20 win against the Chicago Bears after injuring his knee. In Week 17, he collected a season-high eight combined tackles (five solo) as the Eagles defeated the New Orleans Saints 10–20. He finished his rookie season with a total of 34 combined tackles (20 solo), two pass deflections, and one interception in ten games and four starts.

The Philadelphia Eagles finished the 2022 NFL season atop the NFC East with a 14–3 record to clinch a first-round bye. On January 21, 2023, he started his first playoff game and made five combined tackles (two solo) and a pass deflection as the Eagles routed the New York Giants 38–7 in the Divisional Round. The following week, he played in the NFC Championship Game and had six combined tackles (two solo) and recovered a fumble after forcing Deebo Samuel to fumble the ball during a run as the Eagles defeated the San Francisco 49ers 31–7 to advance to the Super Bowl. On February 12, 2023, Blankenship appeared in Super Bowl LVII, but saw limited playing time as the Eagles lost 38–35 to the Kansas City Chiefs.

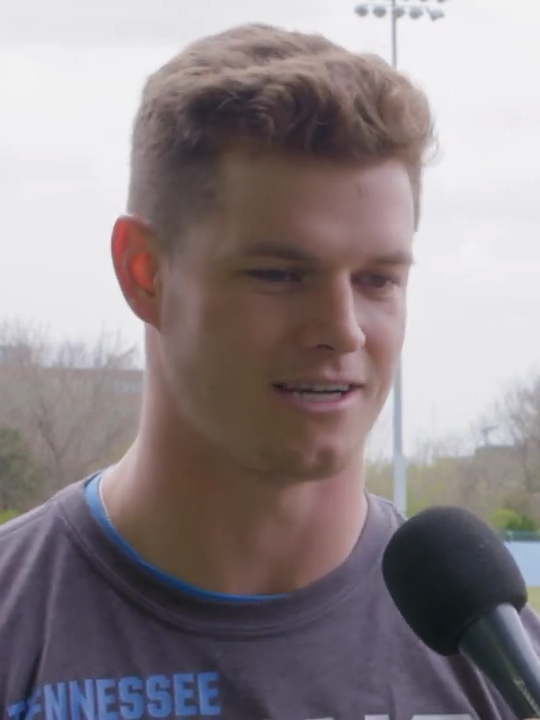
Blankenship in 2022

==== 2023 ====
On February 28, 2023, the Philadelphia Eagles announced the hiring of Seattle Seahawks' defensive assistant Sean Desai as their new defensive coordinator to replace Jonathan Gannon after he accepted the head coaching role with the Arizona Cardinals. During training camp, Blankenship competed against Terrell Edmunds, Sydney Brown, K'Von Wallace, Justin Evans, and Josiah Scott to be the starting free safety after C. J. Gardner-Johnson departed during free agency. Head coach Nick Sirianni named him the starting free safety to start the season and paired him with Justin Evans.

On September 10, 2023, Blankenship started in the Philadelphia Eagles' season-opener at the New England Patriots and collected a season-high 12 combined tackles (eight solo) and made two pass deflections during a 25–20 victory. He sustained an injury to his ribs and was unable to play during the Eagles' 34–28 victory against the Minnesota Vikings in Week 2. In Week 4, he had eight combined tackles (four solo) and a career-high four pass deflections during a 34–31 overtime victory against the Washington Commanders. He was sidelined in Week 7 after re-aggravating his rib injury as the Eagles defeated the Miami Dolphins 31–17. The following week, he made nine combined tackles (seven solo), a pass deflection, and intercepted a pass by Sam Howell to wide receiver Terry McLaurin during a 37–31 win at the Washington Commanders. He finished the season with a total of 113 combined tackles (79 solo), 11 passes defended, three interceptions, and one fumble recovery in 15 games and 15 starts.

==== 2024 ====
On April 1, 2024, the Philadelphia Eagles signed Blankenship to a one–year, $3.93 million contract extension that is fully-guaranteed and includes an initial signing bonus of $1.85 million. He entered training camp slated as the de facto starting free safety under new defensive coordinator Vic Fangio after Sean Desai was fired after one season. Head coach Nick Sirianni named him the starting free safety to begin the season and paired him with strong safety C. J. Gardner-Johnson.

On September 6, 2024, in a week one matchup against the Green Bay Packers in São Paulo, Blankenship picked off quarterback Jordan Love in the 3rd Quarter. The following week, Blankenship racked up a season-high ten combined tackles (nine solo) during a 21–22 loss to the Atlanta Falcons. In Week 3, he made two solo tackles, broke up a pass, and secured a 15–12 win against the New Orleans Saints with an interception off a pass by Derek Carr to wide receiver Rashid Shaheed. On December 4, 2024, Blankenship made four combined tackles (three solo) before exiting the game in the third quarter of a 24–19 win at the Baltimore Ravens after suffering a concussion following an accidental collision with cornerback Cooper DeJean while breaking up a pass to wide receiver Nelson Agholor. On December 22, 2024, Blankenship made five solo tackles and set a career-high with his fourth interception of the season off a pass attempt thrown by Jayden Daniels intended for wide receiver Luke McCaffrey as the Eagles lost 33–36 at the Washington Commanders. He finished the season with a total of 78 combined tackles (62 solo), six pass deflections, and a career-high four interceptions in 15 games and 15 starts.

The Philadelphia Eagles finished the 2024 NFL season first in the NFC East with a 14–3 record. On January 12, 2025, Blankenship recorded his first start in the postseason and had 11 combined tackles (seven solo) and a forced fumble during a 22–10 victory in the NFC Wildcard Game against the Green Bay Packers. The following week, the Eagles secured a 28–22 win against the Los Angeles Rams in the Divisional Round. On January 26, 2025, he had seven combined tackles (five solo) and recovered a fumble as the Eagles routed the Washington Commanders 55–23 to advance to the Super Bowl. On February 9, 2025, Blankenship started in Super Bowl LIX and had three combined tackles (one solo) during a 40–22 victory against the Kansas City Chiefs. He earned the first Super Bowl ring of his career.

=== Houston Texans ===
On March 13, 2026, Blankenship signed a three-year, $24.75 million contract with the Houston Texans.

== NFL career statistics ==
Legend
	Won the Super Bowl
	Led the league
**Bold**	Career best

=== Regular season ===
Year	Team	Games		Tackles					Interceptions						Fumbles			
Year	Team	GP	GS	Cmb	Solo	Ast	Sck	TFL	PD	Int	Yds	Avg	Lng	TD	FF	FR	Yds	TD
2022	PHI	10	4	34	20	14	0.0	0	2	1	4	4.0	4	0	0	0	0	0
2023	PHI	15	15	**113**	**79**	**34**	0.0	**2**	**11**	3	17	5.7	17	0	0	**1**	0	0
2024	PHI	15	15	78	52	26	0.0	0	6	**4**	**29**	**7.3**	**28**	0	0	**1**	**16**	0
2025	PHI	16	16	83	53	30	0.0	1	4	1	0	0	0	0	**1**	**1**	0	0
2026	HOU	8	6	51	28	23	0.0	1	3	1	0	0	0	0	0	0	0	0
Career		64	56	359	232	127	0.0	4	26	10	50	5.0	28	0	1	3	16	0

=== Postseason ===
Year	Team	Games		Tackles					Interceptions						Fumbles			
Year	Team	GP	GS	Cmb	Solo	Ast	Sck	TFL	PD	Int	Yds	Avg	Lng	TD	FF	FR	Yds	TD
2022	PHI	3	1	11	4	7	0.0	**1**	**1**	0	0	0.0	0	0	**1**	**1**	0	0
2024	PHI	4	4	**27**	**18**	**9**	0.0	0	0	0	0	0.0	0	0	**1**	**1**	0	0
2025	PHI	1	1	6	3	3	0.0	0	0	0	0	0.0	0	0	0	0	0	0
Career		8	6	44	25	19	0.0	1	1	0	0	0.0	0	0	2	2	0	0

== Personal life ==
Throughout the 2024 season, Blankenship and rookie cornerback Cooper DeJean were hailed together by fellow Eagles players and fans in a tandem known as "Exciting Whites", due to their ability to make plays together, in reference to a longstanding Internet meme.

Blankenship married Elsa Shafer, a kindergarten teacher, in July 2025. In November 2025 the couple announced they were expecting their first child.
