= Elkmont =

Elkmont may refer to:

- Elkmont, Alabama, a town in Limestone County
  - Elkmont High School, in the above town
- Elkmont, Tennessee, a region
