= Philadelphia Phillies all-time roster (R) =

List of baseball players

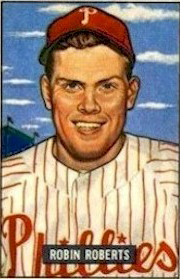
Robin Roberts pitched for the Phillies from 1948 to 1961, was inducted into the Baseball Hall of Fame and the Philadelphia Baseball Wall of Fame, and had his number 36 retired by the team.

The Philadelphia Phillies are a Major League Baseball team based in Philadelphia, Pennsylvania. They are a member of the Eastern Division of Major League Baseball's National League. The team has played officially under two names since beginning play in 1883: the current moniker, as well as the "Quakers", which was used in conjunction with "Phillies" during the team's early history. The team was also known unofficially as the "Blue Jays" during the World War II era. Since the franchise's inception, 2,081 players have made an appearance in a competitive game for the team, whether as an offensive player (batting and baserunning) or a defensive player (fielding, pitching, or both).

Of those 2,081 Phillies, 97 have had surnames beginning with the letter R. Two of those players have been inducted into the Baseball Hall of Fame: pitcher Eppa Rixey, who was a Phillie for six seasons in two different stints (1912–1917, 1919); and Robin Roberts, who won 20 games during the 1950 season as the ace pitcher of the Whiz Kids. The Hall of Fame lists the Phillies as Roberts' primary team; during his career, the right-hander won 234 games and lost 199, the latter one of his three franchise records. During his 14 seasons with the team, he pitched 3,739 1/3 innings and completed 272 games, both records; he also held the major league record for most career home runs allowed until it was broken in 2010. Roberts was also elected to the Philadelphia Baseball Wall of Fame as the Phillies' first inductee in 1978.

Among the 49 batters in this list, second baseman Lou Raymond has the highest batting average, at .500; he notched one hit in two career at-bats. No other player on this list has batted above .300; the next-highest average belongs to Pete Rose, Major League Baseball's all-time hits leader, who batted .291 in his five seasons with Philadelphia. Jimmy Rollins leads all members of this list in home runs and runs batted in, with 154 and 662, respectively.

Of this list's 48 pitchers, Chuck Ricci has the best win–loss record, in terms of winning percentage; he won one game and lost none in his seven appearances with the Phillies. Roberts' 234 victories and 199 defeats are the highest totals in this list, and he also leads in strikeouts, with 1,871. Ricci's 1.80 earned run average (ERA) is the lowest among this list's pitchers; one position player, second baseman Cookie Rojas, has a 0.00 ERA in his only pitching appearance.

Key to symbols in player list(s)
† or ‡	Indicates a member of the National Baseball Hall of Fame and Museum; ‡ indicates that the Phillies are the player's primary team^{[H]}
§	Indicates a member of the Philadelphia Baseball Wall of Fame
*	Indicates a team record^{[R]}
(#)	A number following a player's name indicates that the number was retired by the Phillies in the player's honor.
Year	Italic text indicates that the player is a member of the Phillies' active (25-man) roster.
Position(s)	Indicates the player's primary position(s)^{[P]}
Notes	Statistics shown only for playing time with Phillies^{[S]}
Ref	References

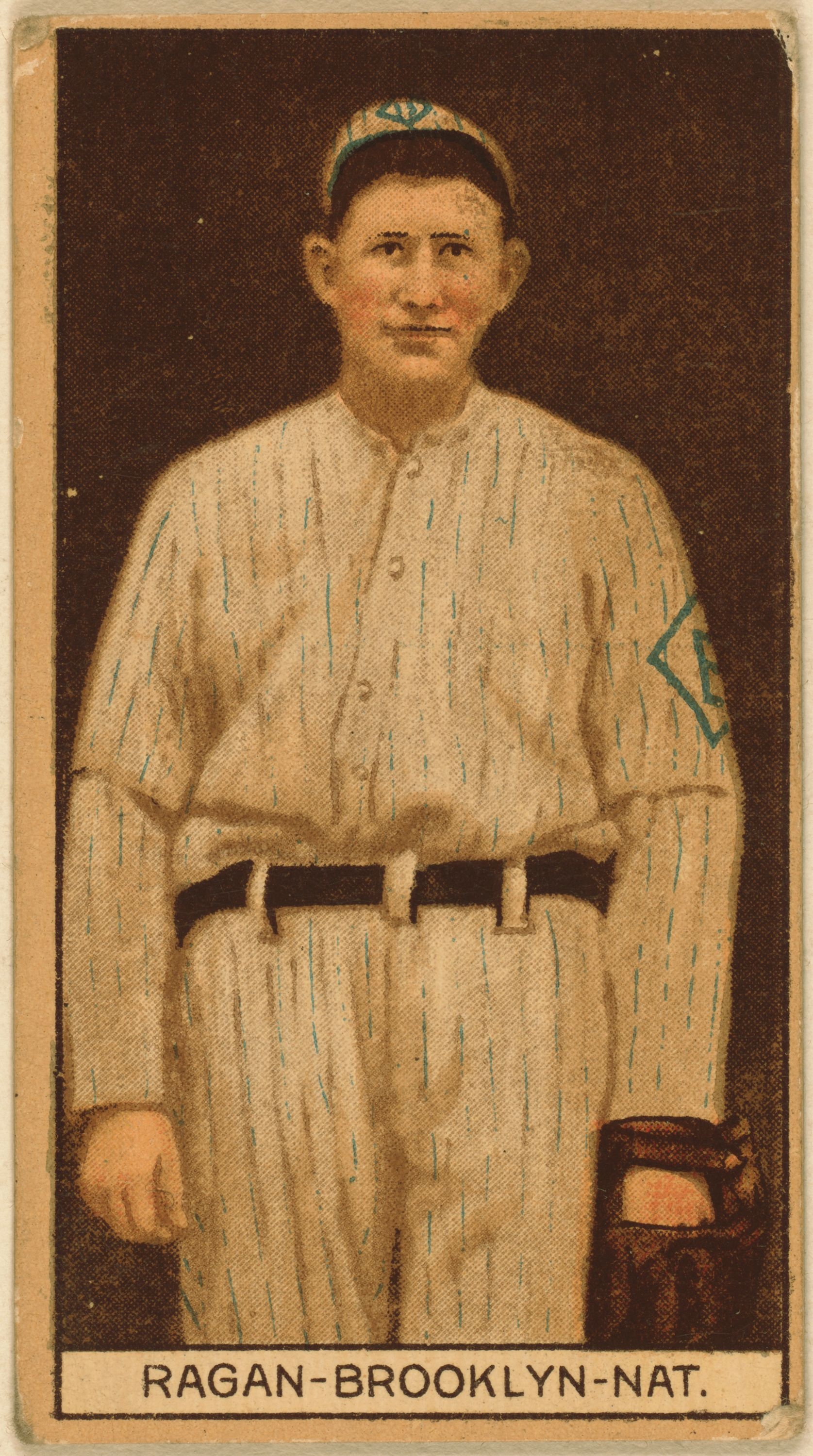
Pitcher Pat Ragan allowed two earned runs in his only season with the Phillies.

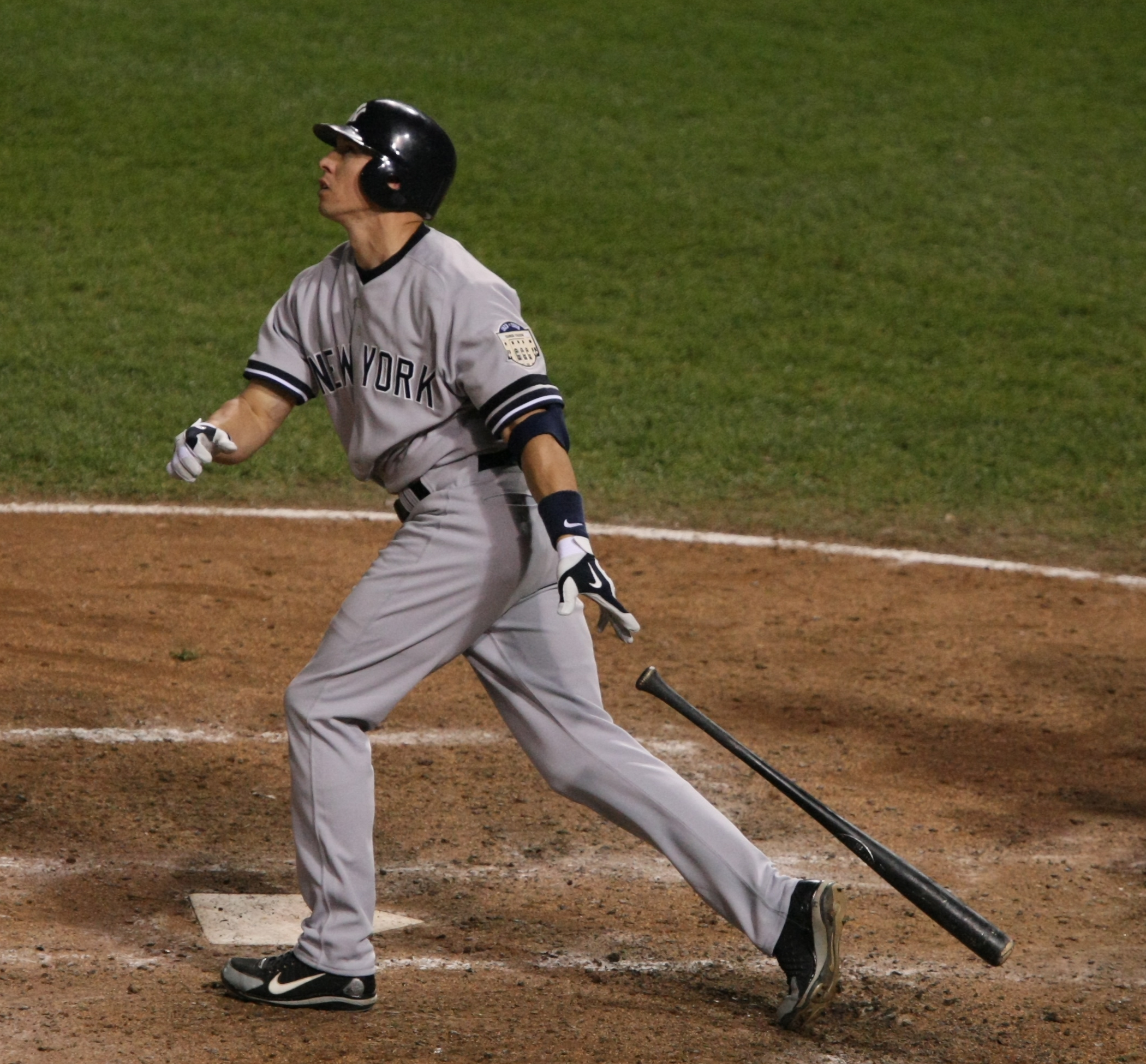
Cody Ransom played for Philadelphia in the 2010 season.

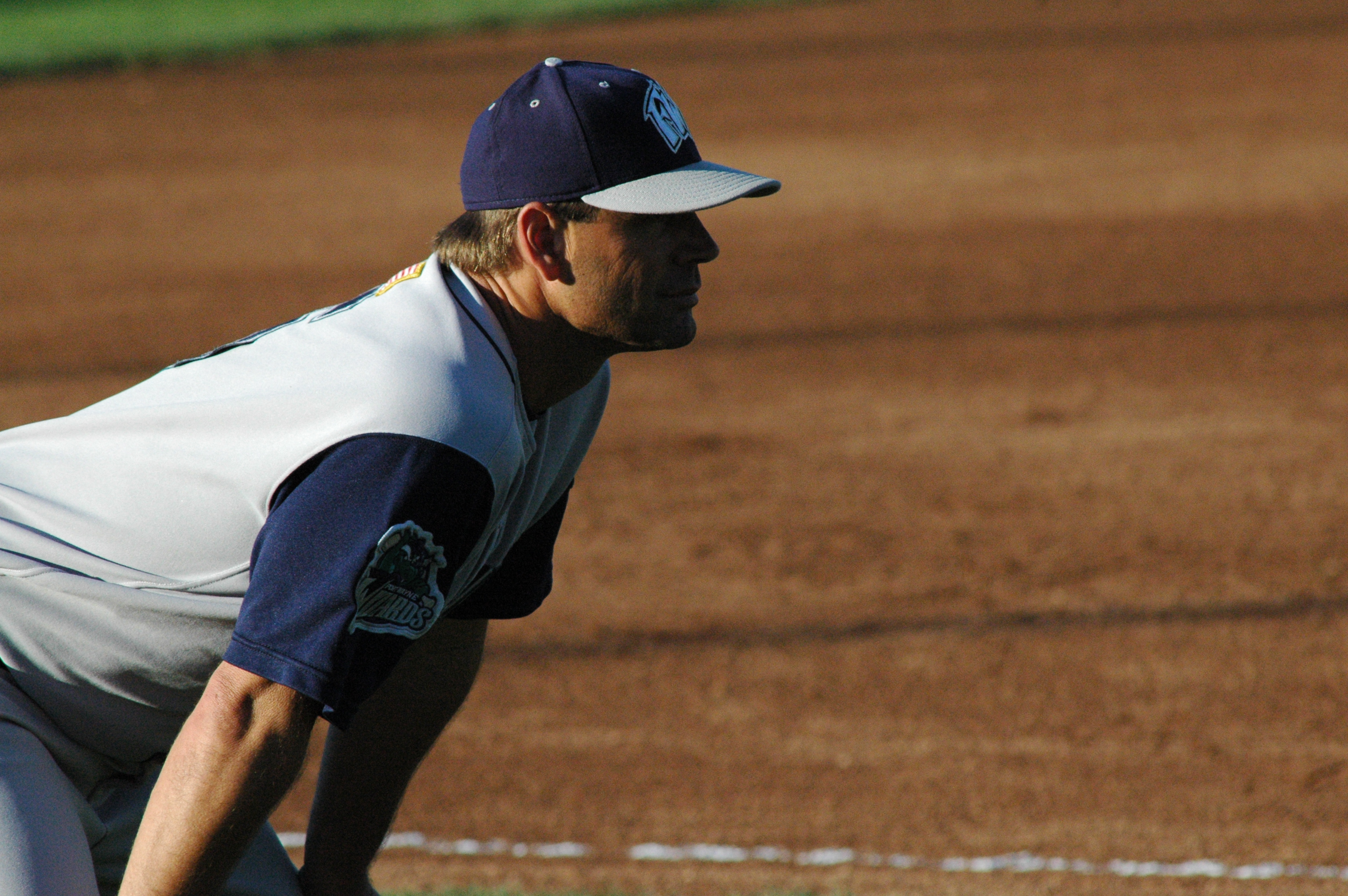
Randy Ready had two tenures with the Phillies: an eleven-season stint from 1981 to 1991, and then two more years from 1994 to 1995.

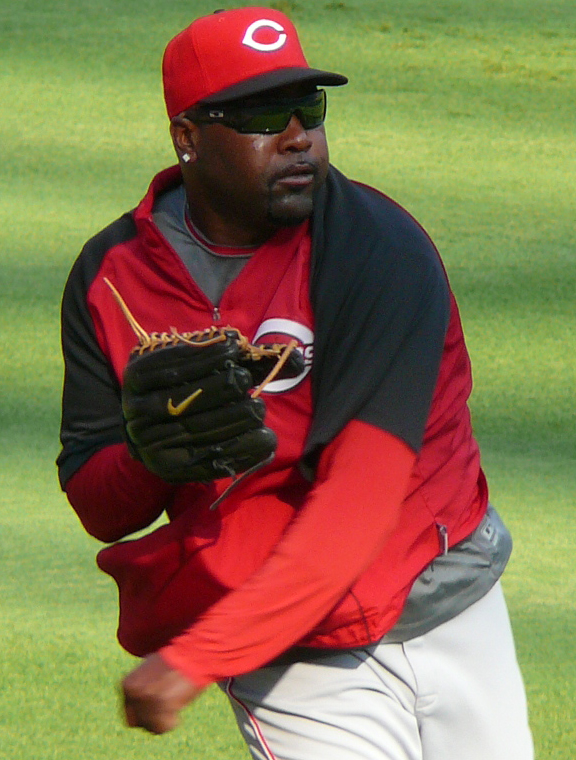
Arthur Rhodes played one season with Philadelphia, winning no games and losing five.

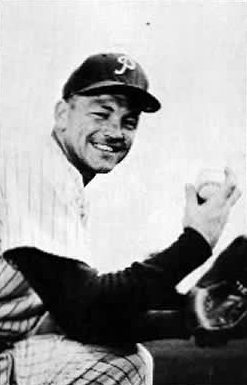
Steve Ridzik pitched for the Phillies during three separate tenures: the 1950 Whiz Kids season, from 1952 to 1955, and during the 1966 season.

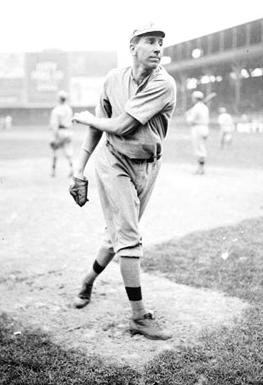
Hall of Famer Eppa Rixey won 87 games for the Phillies in eight seasons with the team.

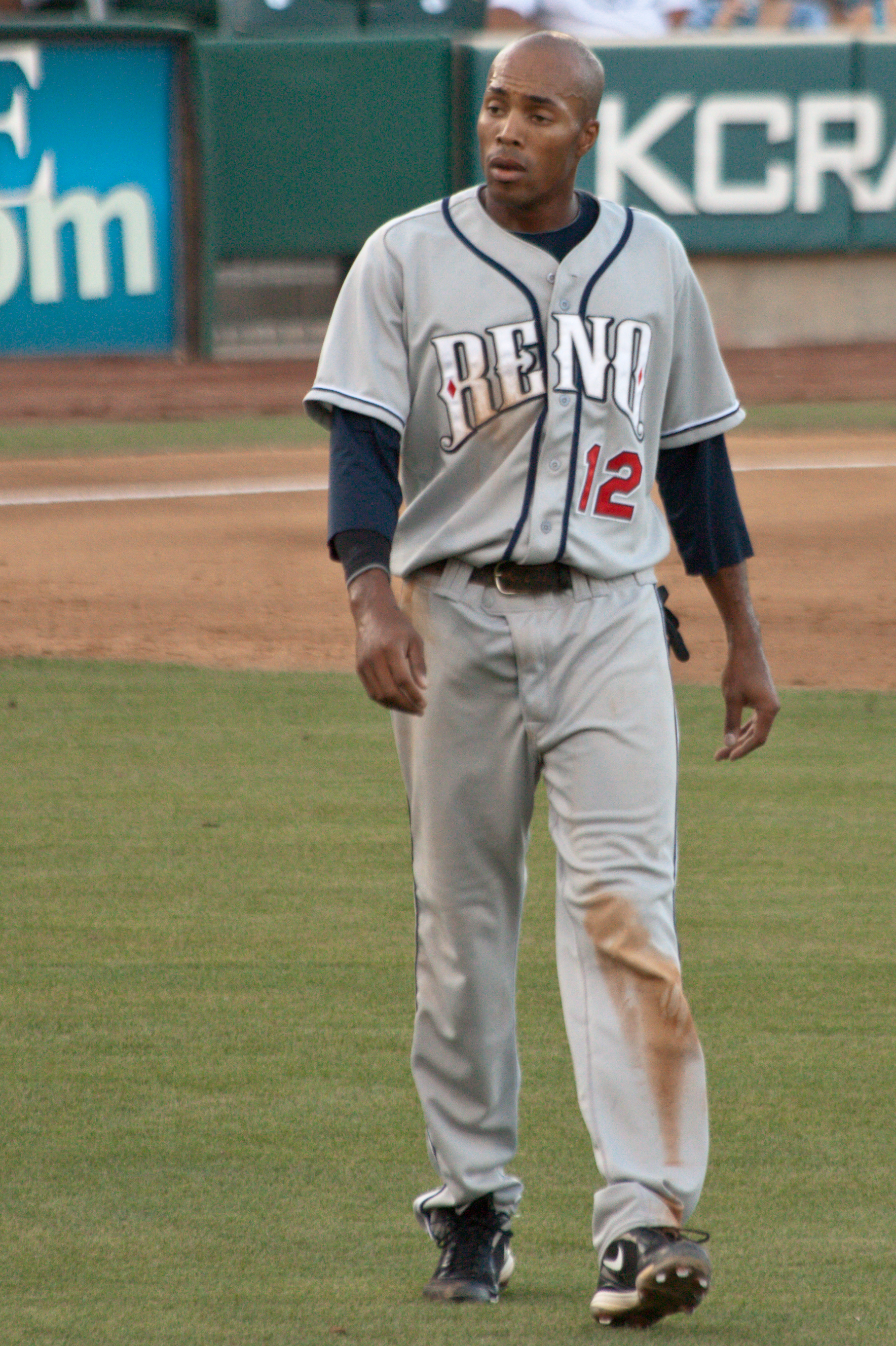
Chris Roberson notched one extra-base hit, a triple, in his two years with Philadelphia.

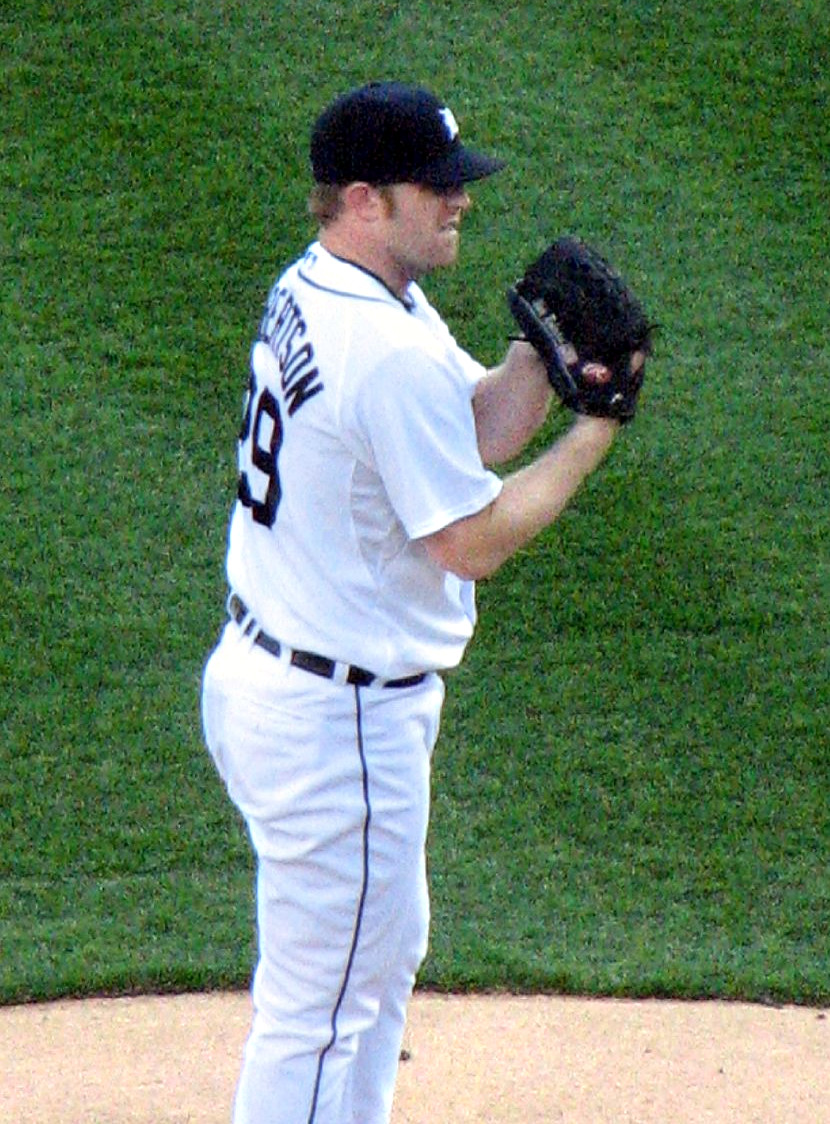
Nate Robertson amassed an earned run average of 54.00 in his only season with the Phillies.

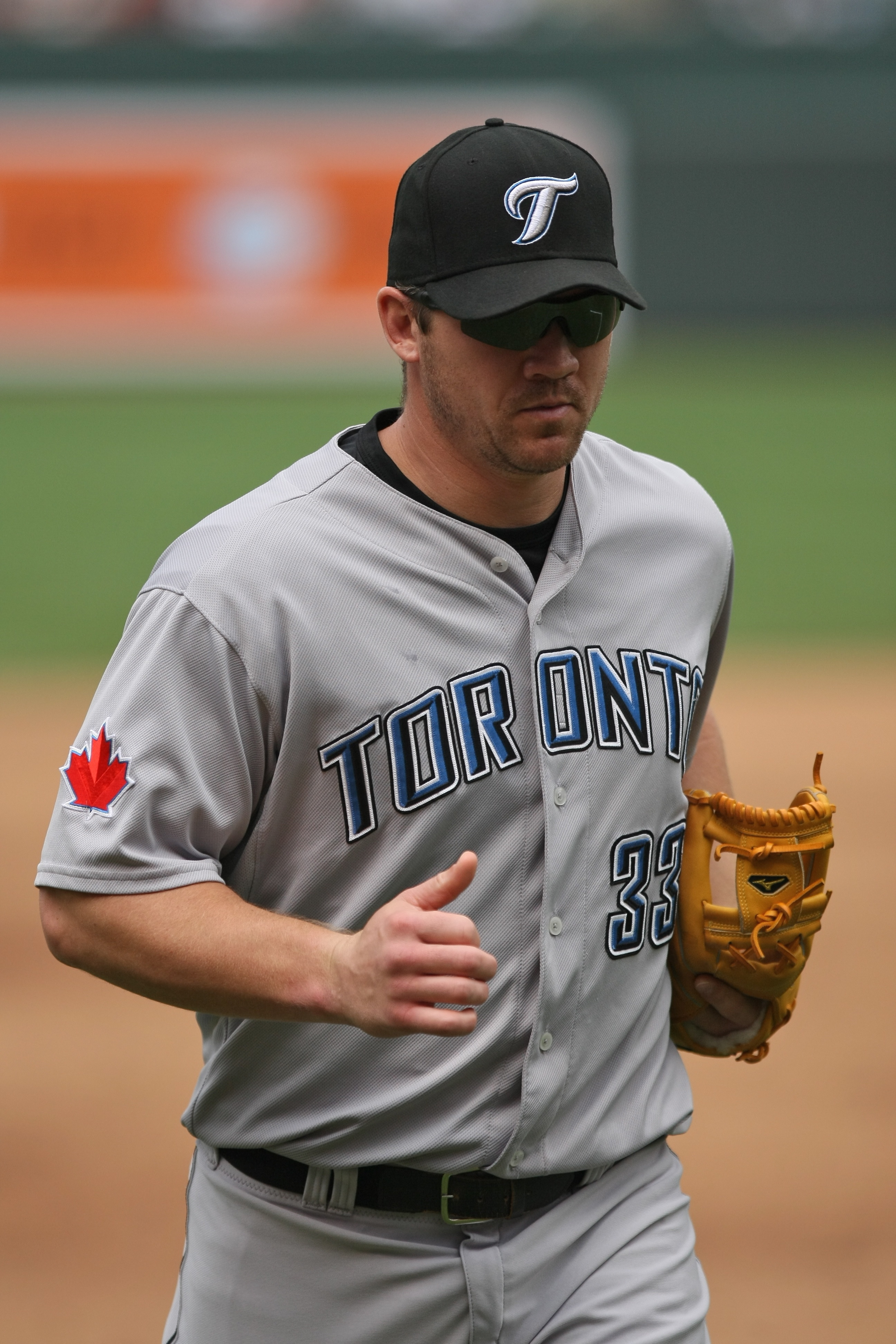
Scott Rolen won four Gold Gloves during his tenures with the Phillies, including his partial 2002 season.

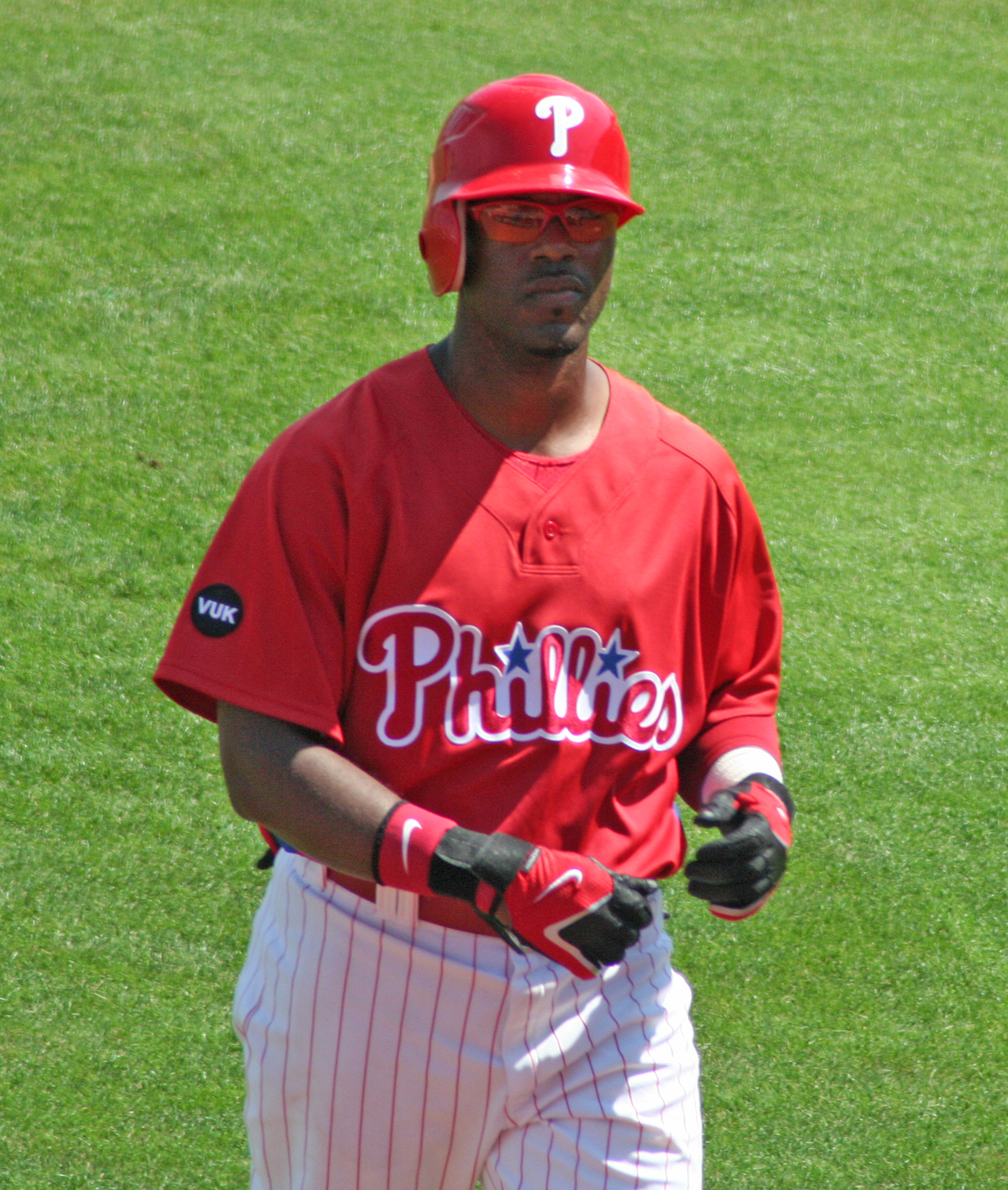
Shortstop Jimmy Rollins holds franchise records for at-bats and plate appearances in a single season; the former is also a major league record.

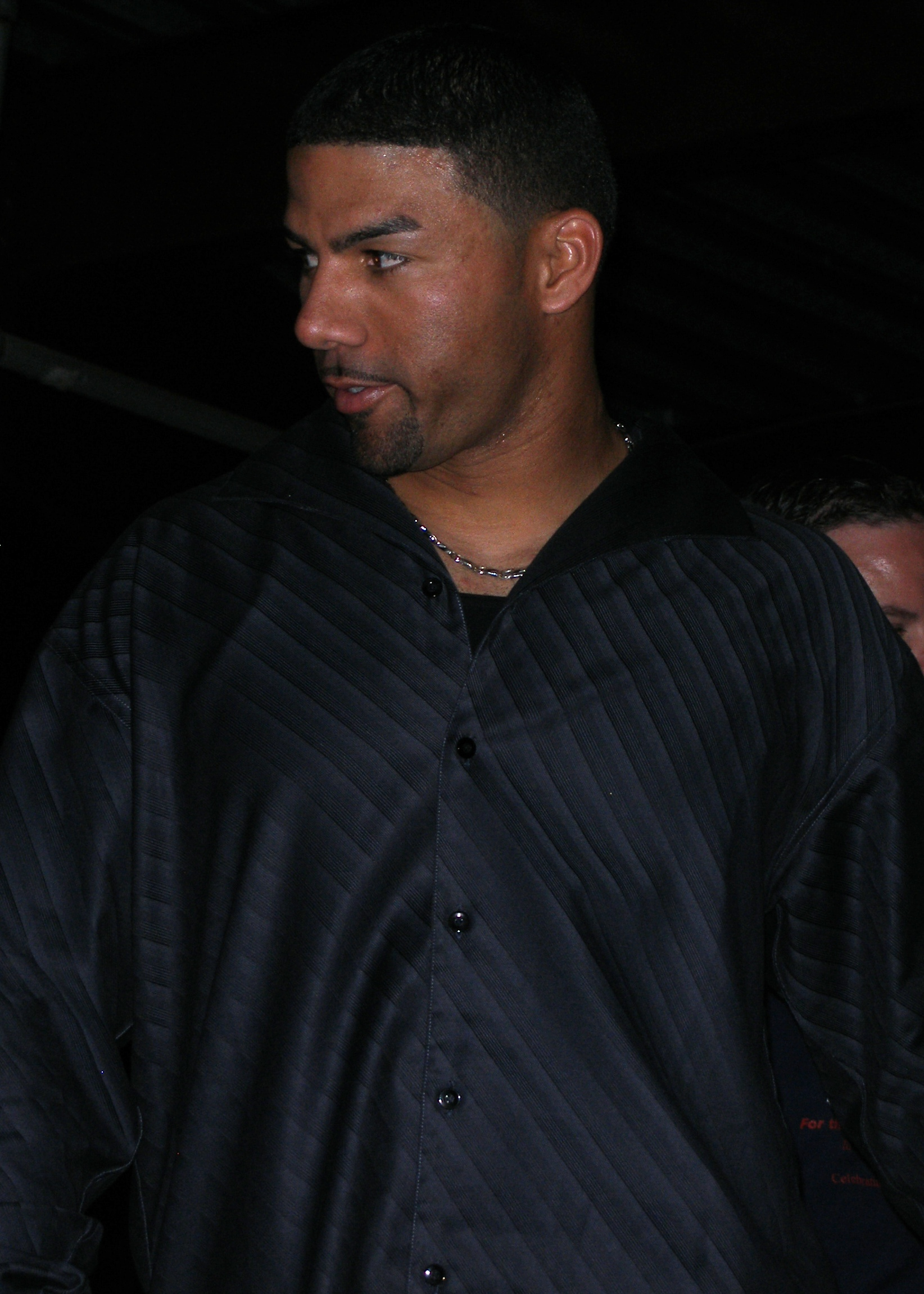
J. C. Romero won six games and lost six during his five-year Philadelphia tenure.

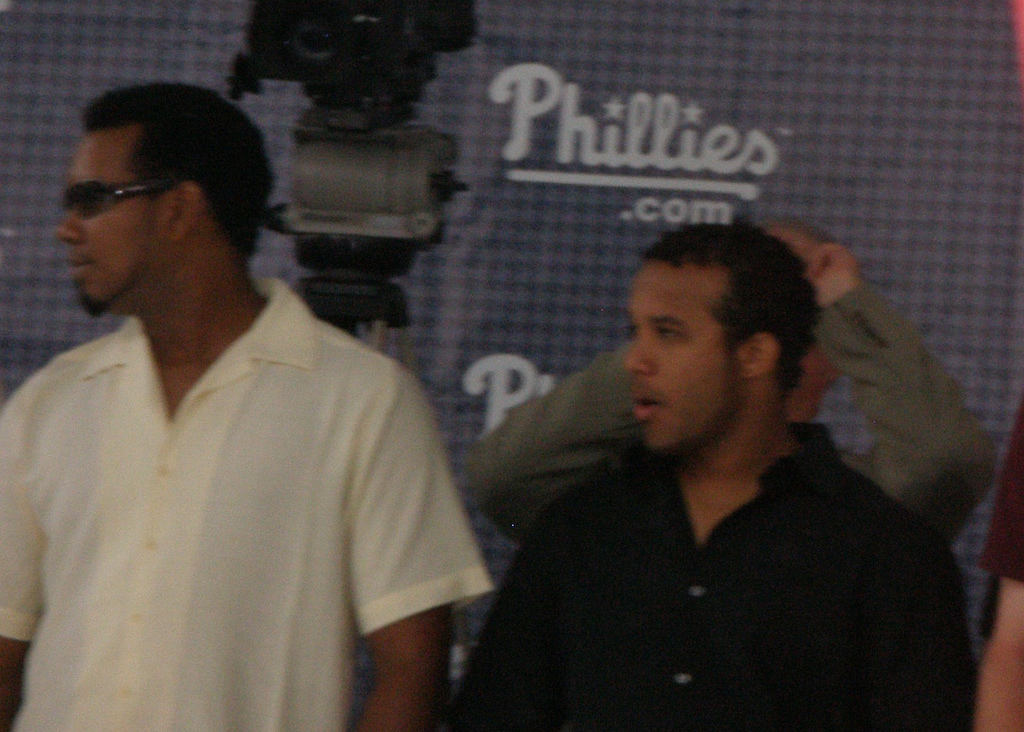
Francisco Rosario (left) lost all three decisions he earned during the 2007 season.

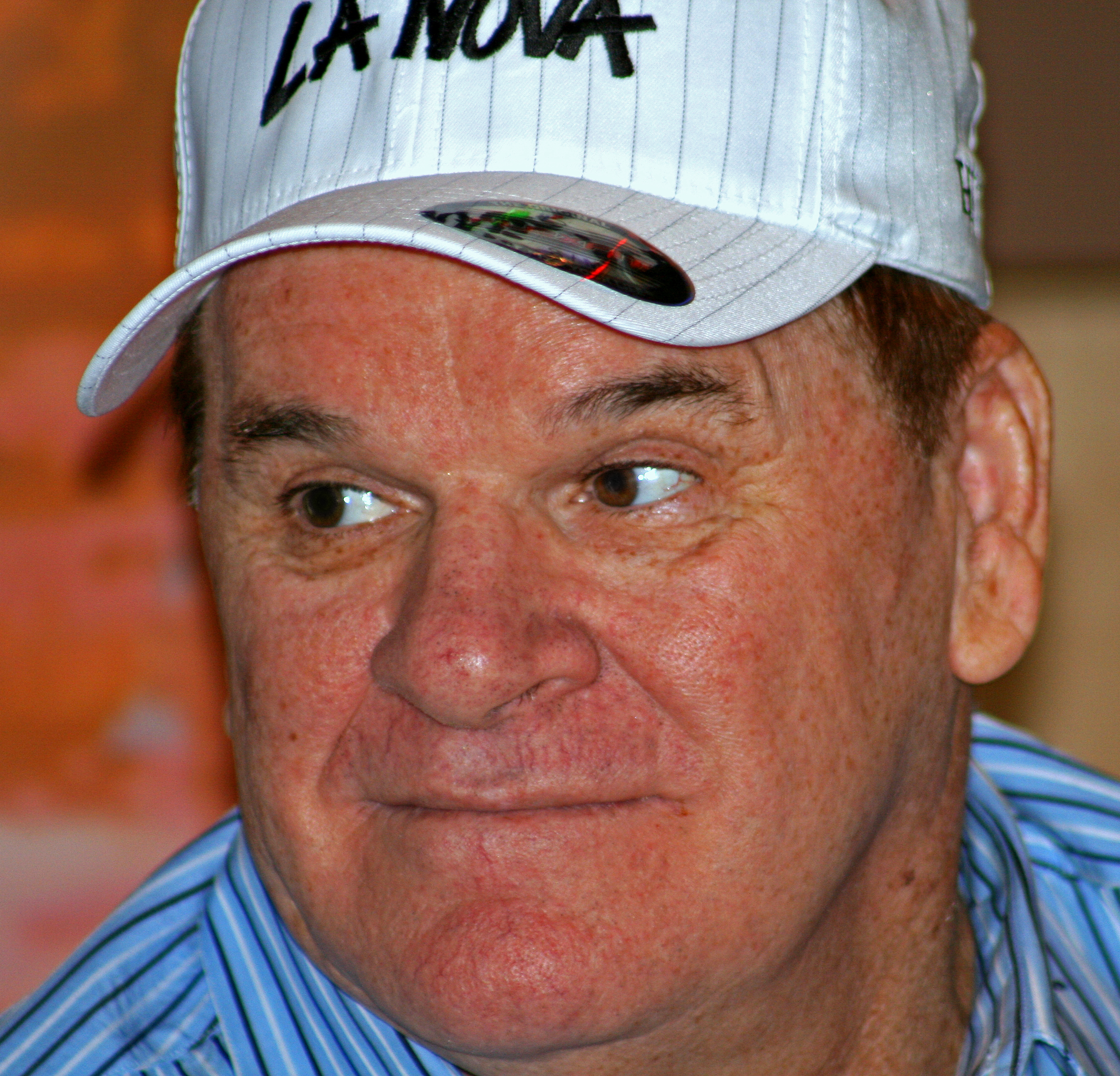
Pete Rose is Major League Baseball's all-time career hits leader.

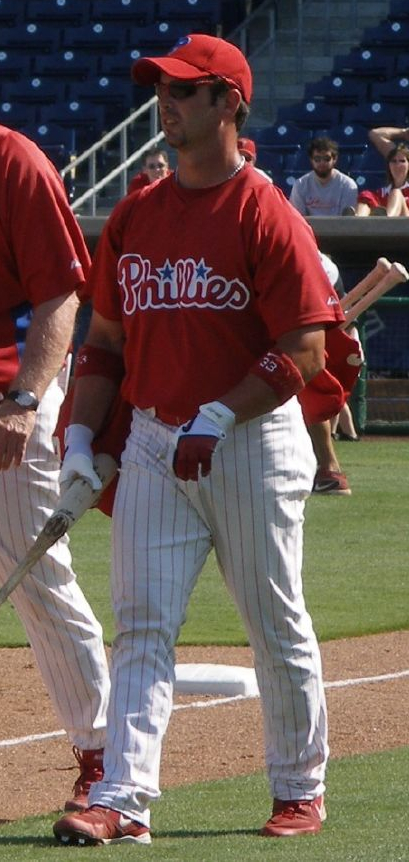
In 2006, center fielder Aaron Rowand broke his nose against the fence at Citizens Bank Park while making a catch for the Phillies.

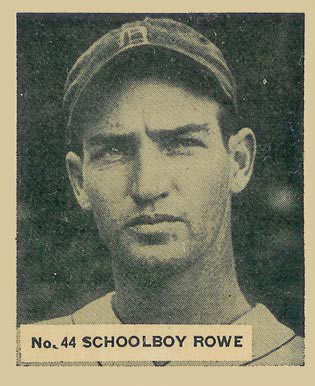
Schoolboy Rowe won 52 games pitching for the Phillies during and after World War II.

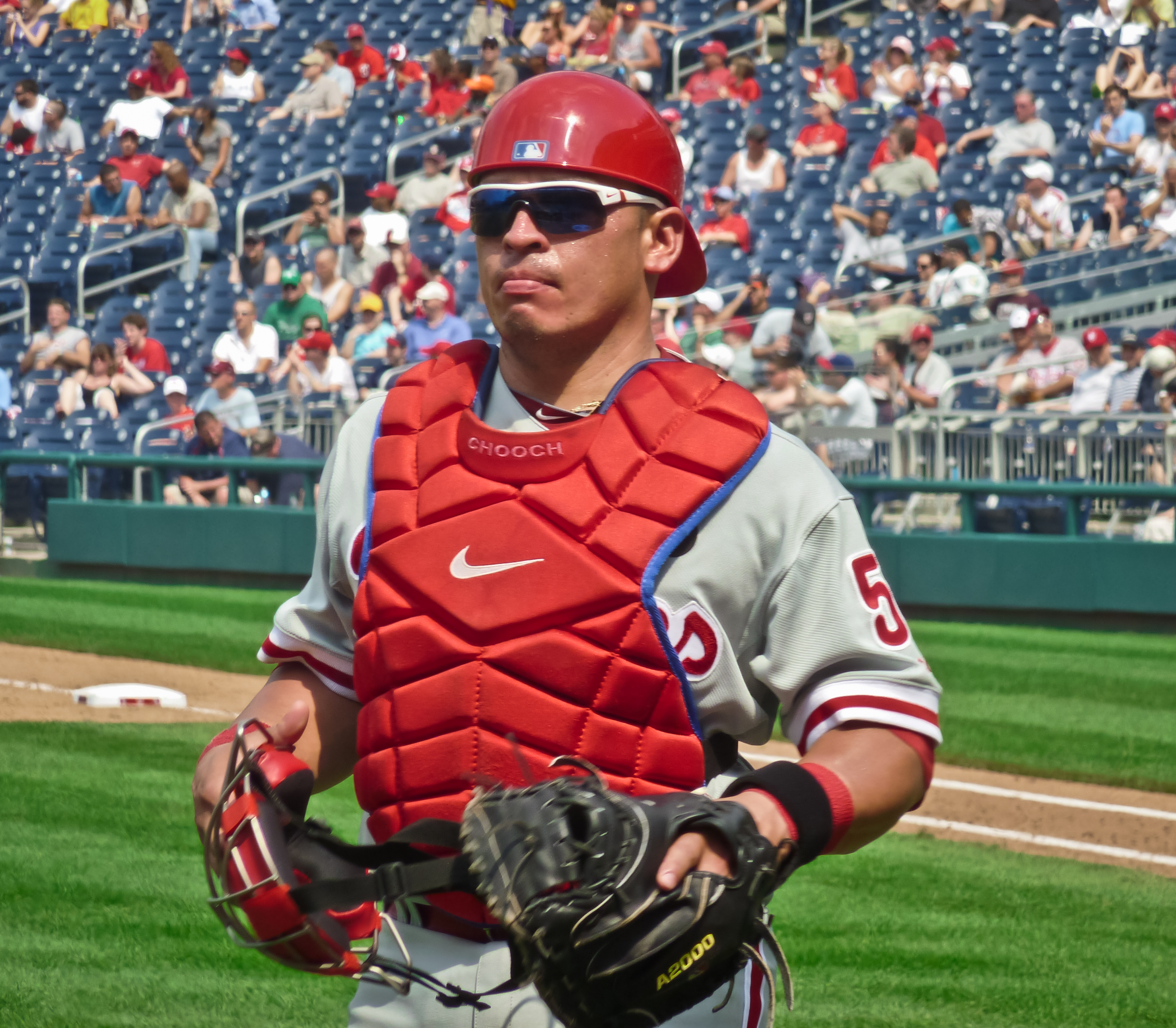
Carlos Ruiz became the first Phillie to deliver a walk-off World Series win in 2008, and the first to catch two no-hitters in 2010.

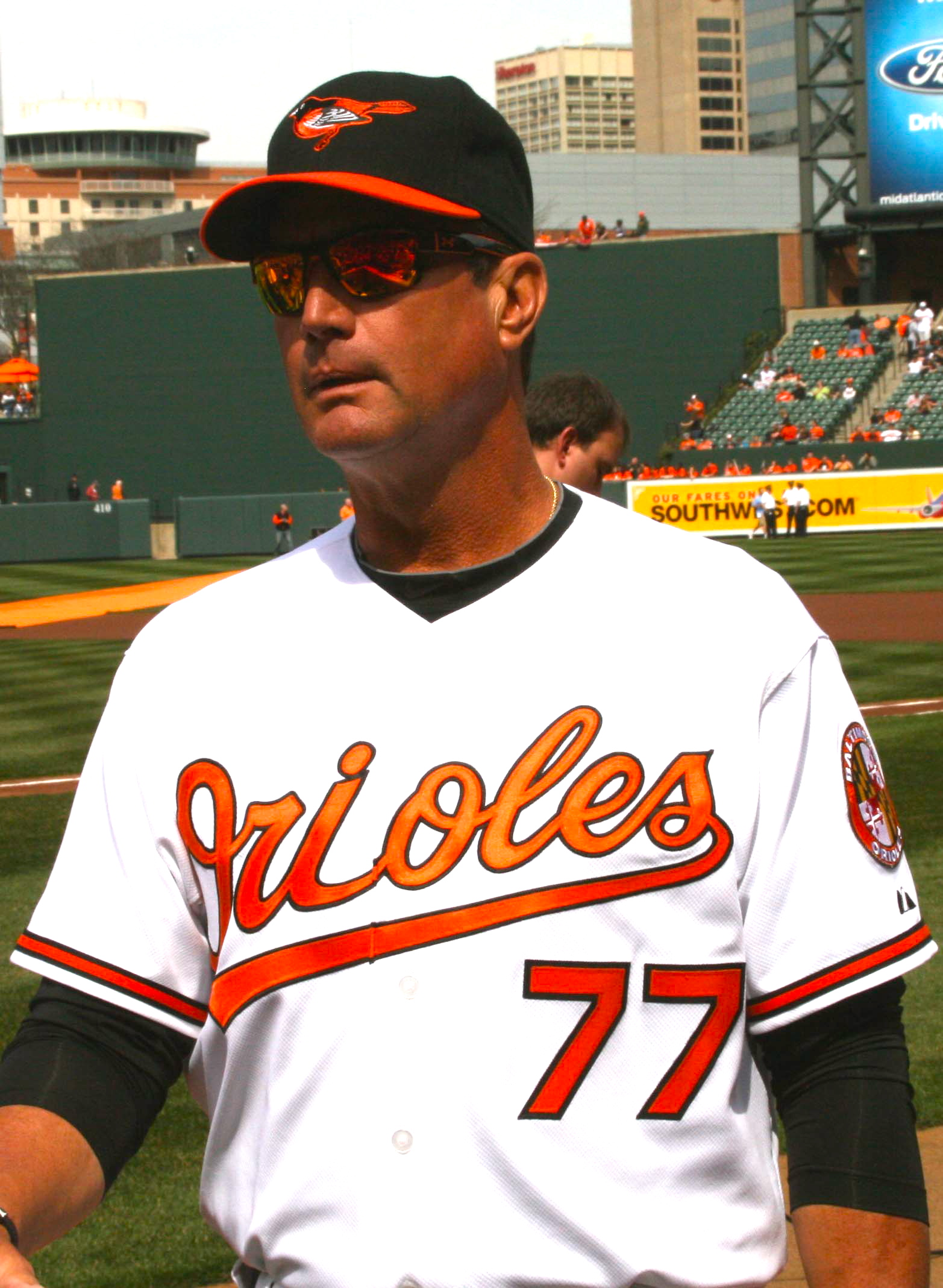
Before being hired as the Pittsburgh Pirates' manager in 2007, former Phillie John Russell managed the Philadelphia franchise's triple-A team.

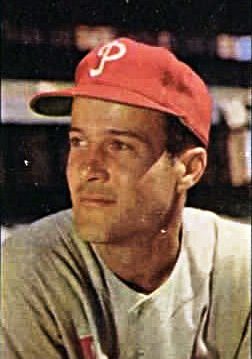
Connie Ryan, a second baseman, hit 17 home runs for Philadelphia in 2 seasons.

List of players whose surnames begin with R, showing season(s) and position(s) played and selected statistics
Name	Season(s)	Position(s)	Notes	Ref
Dave Rader	1979	Catcher	.204 batting average; 1 home run; 5 runs batted in	
Don Rader	1921	Shortstop	.281 batting average; 3 runs batted in; 4 runs scored	
Ken Raffensberger	1943–1947	Pitcher	23–45 record; 3.49 earned run average; 234 strikeouts	
Al Raffo	1969	Pitcher	1–3 record; 4.11 earned run average; 38 strikeouts	
Pat Ragan	1923	Pitcher	6.00 earned run average; 2 runs allowed; 3 innings pitched	
Frank Ragland	1933	Pitcher	0–4 record; 6.81 earned run average; 4 strikeouts	
Pete Rambo	1926	Pitcher	14.73 earned run average; 4 strikeouts; 4 walks	
Elizardo Ramírez	2004	Pitcher	4.80 earned run average; 9 strikeouts; 5 walks	
Edgar Ramos	1997	Pitcher	0–2 record; 5.14 earned run average; 4 strikeouts	
Pedro Ramos	1967	Pitcher	9.00 earned run average; 2 strikeouts; 1 walk	
Alan Rangel	2025	Pitcher		
Cody Ransom	2010	Third baseman Second baseman	.190 batting average; 2 home runs; 5 runs batted in	
Goldie Rapp	1921–1923	Third baseman	.260 batting average; 2 home runs; 58 runs batted in	
Shane Rawley	1984–1988	Pitcher	59–48 record; 3.88 earned run average; 447 strikeouts	
Johnny Rawlings	1920–1921	Second baseman	.257 batting average; 4 home runs; 46 runs batted in	
Lou Raymond	1919	Second baseman	.500 batting average; 1 hit; 2 plate appearances	
Randy Ready	1981–1991; 1994–1995	Third baseman Left fielder	.256 batting average; 11 home runs; 70 runs batted in	
Leroy Reams	1969	Pinch hitter^{[a]}	.000 batting average; 1 plate appearance; 1 strikeout	
Art Rebel	1938	Right fielder Center fielder	.222 batting average; 1 run batted in; 2 runs scored	
Gary Redus	1984	Left fielder	.247 batting average; 11 home runs; 33 runs batted in	
Jerry Reed	1981–1982	Pitcher	1–1 record; 6.08 earned run average; 6 strikeouts	
Milt Reed	1913–1914	Shortstop; Second baseman	.214 batting average; 2 runs batted in; 14 runs scored	
Ron Reed	1976–1983	Pitcher	57–38 record; 3.06 earned run average; 547 strikeouts	
Steven Register	2009	Pitcher	4.50 earned run average; 1 strikeout; 1 walk	
Scott Reid	1969–1970	Center fielder	.147 batting average; 1 run batted in; 10 runs scored	
Charlie Reilly	1892–1895	Third baseman	.240 batting average; 5 home runs; 124 runs batted in	
Tommy Reis	1938	Pitcher	0–1 record; 19.29 earned run average; 2 strikeouts	
Desi Relaford	1996–2000	Shortstop	.234 batting average; 9 home runs; 104 runs batted in	
Butch Rementer	1904	Catcher	.000 batting average; 2 plate appearances	
Jack Remsen	1884	Center fielder	.209 batting average; 3 runs batted in; 9 runs scored	
Tony Rensa	1930–1931	Catcher	.259 batting average; 3 home runs; 33 runs batted in	
Rip Repulski	1957–1958	Right fielder Left fielder	.255 batting average; 33 home runs; 108 runs batted in	
Carlos Reyes	2000	Pitcher	0–2 record; 5.23 earned run average; 4 strikeouts	
Ken Reynolds	1970–1972	Pitcher	7–24 record; 4.34 earned run average; 169 strikeouts	
Ronn Reynolds	1986	Catcher	.214 batting average; 3 home runs; 10 runs batted in	
Flint Rhem	1932–1933	Pitcher	16–21 record; 4.96 earned run average; 62 strikeouts	
Arthur Rhodes	2006	Pitcher	0–5 record; 5.32 earned run average; 48 strikeouts	
Chuck Ricci	1995	Pitcher	1–0 record; 1.80 earned run average; 9 strikeouts	
Bob Rice	1926	Third baseman	.148 batting average; 10 runs batted in; 3 runs scored	
Ken Richardson	1946	Second baseman	.150 batting average; 2 runs batted in; 1 run scored	
Lance Richbourg	1921	Second baseman	.200 batting average; 1 double; 2 runs scored	
Pete Richert	1974	Pitcher	2–1 record; 2.21 earned run average; 9 strikeouts	
Lew Richie	1906–1909	Pitcher	23–28 record; 2.06 earned run average; 174 strikeouts	
Steve Ridzik	1950; 1952–1955; 1966	Pitcher	17–14 record; 3.64 earned run average; 149 strikeouts	
Leon Riley	1944	Left fielder	.083 batting average; 1 run batted in; 1 run scored	
Jimmy Ring	1921–1925; 1928	Pitcher	68–98 record; 4.47 earned run average; 551 strikeouts	
Frank Ringo	1883–1884	Catcher	.173 batting average; 13 extra-base hits; 18 runs batted in	
Charlie Ripple	1944–1946	Pitcher	1–1 record; 9.45 earned run average; 10 strikeouts	
Wally Ritchie	1987–1988; 1991–1992	Pitcher	6–5 record; 3.14 earned run average; 98 strikeouts	
Hank Ritter	1912	Pitcher	4.50 earned run average; 1 strikeout; 5 walks	
Ben Rivera	1992–1994	Pitcher	23–16 record; 4.51 earned run average; 208 strikeouts	
Eppa Rixey^{†}	1912–1917; 1919	Pitcher	87–103 record; 2.83 earned run average; 690 strikeouts	
Johnny Rizzo	1940–1941	Left fielder	.262 batting average; 24 home runs; 77 runs batted in	
Joe Roa	2002–2003	Pitcher	4–6 record; 4.47 earned run average; 51 strikeouts	
Mel Roach	1962	Third baseman	.190 batting average; 4 doubles; 8 runs batted in	
Chris Roberson	2006–2007	Right fielder Left fielder	.232 batting average; 1 triple; 2 runs batted in	
Dave Roberts	1982	Third baseman Catcher	.182 batting average; 1 double; 2 runs batted in	
Robin Roberts^{‡§} (#36)	1948–1961	Pitcher	234–199* record; 3.46 earned run average; 1,871 strikeouts; 3,739 1/3 innings pitched*; 272 complete games*	
Mike Robertson	1997	First baseman Left fielder	.211 batting average; 3 extra-base hits; 4 runs batted in	
Nate Robertson	2010	Pitcher	54.00 earned run average; 2 strikeouts; 2 walks	
Bill Robinson	1972–1974; 1982–1983	Right fielder Center fielder	.261 batting average; 41 home runs; 136 runs batted in	
Craig Robinson	1972–1973	Shortstop	.224 batting average; 8 doubles; 7 runs batted in	
Don Robinson	1992	Pitcher	1–4 record; 6.18 earned run average; 17 strikeouts	
Humberto Robinson	1959–1960	Pitcher	2–8 record; 3.38 earned run average; 63 strikeouts	
Félix Rodríguez	2004	Pitcher	2–3 record; 3.00 earned run average; 28 strikeouts	
Freddy Rodríguez	1959	Pitcher	13.50 earned run average; 1 strikeout; 3 runs allowed	
Ed Roebuck	1964–1966	Pitcher	10–8 record; 2.83 earned run average; 690 strikeouts	
Ron Roenicke	1986–1987	Center fielder	.229 batting average; 6 home runs; 46 runs batted in	
Mike Rogodzinski	1973–1975	Right fielder Left fielder	.219 batting average; 2 home runs; 12 runs batted in	
Saul Rogovin	1955–1957	Pitcher	12–9 record; 4.41 earned run average; 75 strikeouts	
Cookie Rojas	1963–1969	Second baseman	.262 batting average; 29 home runs; 253 runs batted in	
Scott Rolen	1996–2002	Third baseman	.282 batting average; 150 home runs; 559 runs batted in	
Jimmy Rollins	2000–2011	Shortstop	.272 batting average; 170 home runs; 725 runs batted in	
J. C. Romero	2007–2011	Pitcher	6–6 record; 2.73 earned run average; 133 strikeouts	
Francisco Rosario	2007	Pitcher	0–3 record; 5.47 earned run average; 25 strikeouts	
Pete Rose	1979–1983	First baseman	.291 batting average; 157 extra-base hits; 255 runs batted in	
Bob Ross	1956	Pitcher	8.10 earned run average; 4 strikeouts; 2 walks	
Frank Roth	1903–1904	Catcher	.265 batting average; 1 home run; 42 runs batted in	
Jack Rowan	1911	Pitcher	2–4 record; 4.73 earned run average; 17 strikeouts	
Aaron Rowand	2006–2007	Center fielder	.290 batting average; 39 home runs; 136 runs batted in	
Schoolboy Rowe	1943; 1946–1949	Pitcher	52–39 record; 3.54 earned run average; 245 strikeouts	
Bama Rowell	1948	Third baseman Left fielder	.240 batting average; 1 home run; 22 runs batted in	
Charlie Roy	1906	Pitcher	0–1 record; 4.91 earned run average; 6 strikeouts	
Luther Roy	1929	Pitcher	3–6 record; 8.42 earned run average; 16 strikeouts	
Vic Roznovsky	1969	Catcher	.231 batting average; 3 hits; 1 runs batted in	
Art Ruble	1934	Right fielder	.278 batting average; 8 runs batted in; 7 runs scored	
Dave Rucker	1985–1986	Pitcher	3–4 record; 4.66 earned run average; 55 strikeouts	
Dutch Rudolph	1903	Pinch hitter^{[b]}	.000 batting average; 1 plate appearance	
Scott Ruffcorn	1997	Pitcher	0–3 record; 7.71 earned run average; 33 strikeouts	
Bruce Ruffin	1986–1991	Pitcher	42–58 record; 4.16 earned run average; 479 strikeouts	
Carlos Ruiz	2006–2011	Catcher	.265 batting average; 36 home runs; 231 runs batted in	
José Ruiz	2024-Present	Pitcher	0–0 record; 0.00 earned run average; 1 strikeouts	
John Russell	1984–1988	Catcher; Left fielder	.232 batting average; 29 home runs; 106 runs batted in	
Dick Ruthven	1973–1975; 1978–1983	Pitcher	78–65 record; 4.00 earned run average; 717 strikeouts	
Mark Ryal	1989	First baseman	.242 batting average; 2 doubles; 5 runs batted in	
Blondy Ryan	1935	Shortstop	.264 batting average; 1 home run; 10 runs batted in	
Connie Ryan	1952–1953	Second baseman	.257 batting average; 17 home runs; 75 runs batted in	
Ken Ryan	1996–1999	Pitcher	5–7 record; 4.14 earned run average; 105 strikeouts	
Mike Ryan	1968–1973	Catcher	.190 batting average; 21 home runs; 91 runs batted in	

== Footnotes ==
Key

- ^{H} The National Baseball Hall of Fame and Museum determines which cap a player wears on their plaque, signifying "the team with which he made his most indelible mark". The Hall of Fame considers the player's wishes in making their decision, but the Hall makes the final decision as "it is important that the logo be emblematic of the historical accomplishments of that player's career".
- ^{P} Players are listed at a position if they appeared in 30% of their games or more during their Phillies career, as defined by Baseball-Reference. Additional positions may be shown on the Baseball-Reference website by following each player's citation.
- ^{R} Franchise batting and pitching leaders are drawn from Baseball-Reference. A total of 1,500 plate appearances are needed to qualify for batting records, and 500 innings pitched or 50 decisions are required to qualify for pitching records.
- ^{S} Statistics are correct as of the end of the 2010 Major League Baseball season.

Table

- ^{a} Leroy Reams is listed by Baseball-Reference without a position; he appeared in one career game for the Phillies on May 7, 1969.
- ^{b} Dutch Rudolph is listed by Baseball-Reference as a right fielder, but never appeared in a game in the field for the Phillies.
