= Henry A. White =

American educator and politician

Member of the Alabama House of Representatives from the 5th district
- In office January 3, 2007 – January 3, 2011
- Preceded by: Tommy Carter
- Succeeded by: Dan Williams

Personal details
- Born: November 15, 1948 (age 78)
- Party: Democratic

Henry A. White (born November 15, 1948) is an American educator and politician.

Born in Limestone County, Alabama, White graduated from Tanner High School, in Tanner, Alabama. He then received his associate and bachelor's degree from University of North Alabama in physical education and educational management. White then received his master's degree from University of Montevallo in educational management and was an educator in the Limestone County, Alabama school system for 36 years. White was the superintendent for the county school system. White served on the Athens, Alabama City Council and was a Democrat. From 2007 to 2011, White served in the Alabama House of Representatives and was defeated for re-election in 2010. In 2014, White announced he would run for election to his old seat, but was defeated by the then incumbent Dan Williams, garnering 43.5% of the vote.
