= Tanner, Alabama =

Unincorporated community in Alabama, United States

- Unincorporated community
- Location within Alabama Location within the United States
- Coordinates: 34°43′53″N 86°58′14″W
- Country: United States
- State: Alabama
- County: Limestone
- Elevation: 666 ft (203 m)
- Time zone: UTC-6 (Central (CST))
  - Summer (DST): UTC-5 (CDT)
- ZIP code: 35671
- Area code: 256
- GNIS feature ID: 153647

Tanner is an unincorporated community in central southern Limestone County, Alabama, United States, and is included in the Huntsville-Decatur Combined Statistical Area. It lies nine miles north of the city of Decatur and the Tennessee River, and four miles south of the city of Athens.

== Education ==
Tanner is home to Tanner High School (The Rattlers), a 2A school in the state's classification system. The school's boys' and girls' basketball teams both won state titles in 1986 and 2011 and is the only school in Alabama to do so. The boys' soccer team also won the state title in 2023.

== History ==
=== 19th century ===
Tanner was settled along the Louisville and Nashville Railroad in the 19th century and was originally named McDonald's Station, then Rowland. A Rowland post office was established in 1878. In 1913, the Tanner post office was established, named after Samuel Tanner who was the first mayor of nearby Athens.

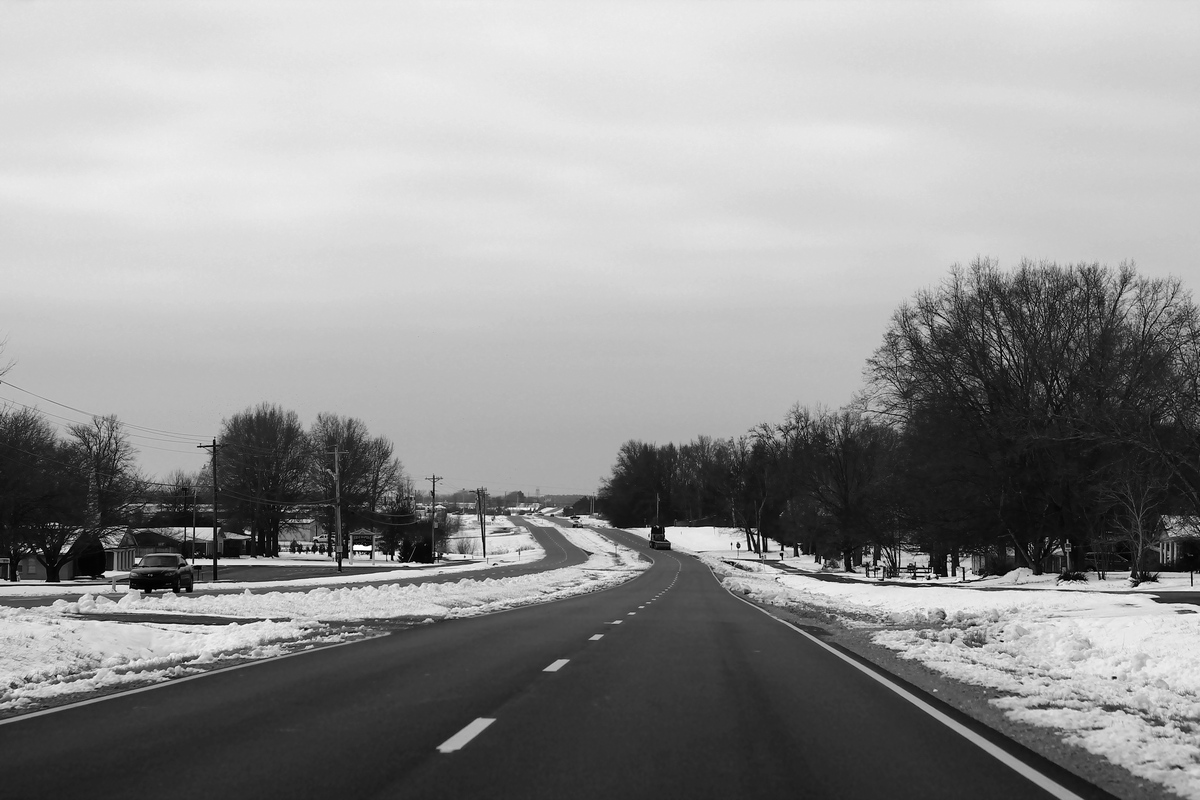

=== 20th and 21st centuries ===
On May 8, 1913, the post office in Tanner, Alabama, was burglarized by a group of criminals referred to as "yeggmen." The thieves blew open the post office safe, which was located in a store owned by E. P. Dowd. They stole a significant amount of stamps, money orders, and several hundred dollars in cash. The robbers successfully escaped; however, authorities reportedly had promising leads on their identities. A government post office inspector arrived in Tanner later that day via train from Memphis to conduct an official investigation. Details about the crime remained scarce at the time of reporting.

On August 1, 1913, Mrs. A. J. Richardson was struck and killed by lightning in Tanner amid high winds sweeping through the region around 3:00 PM.

==== Tornado History ====
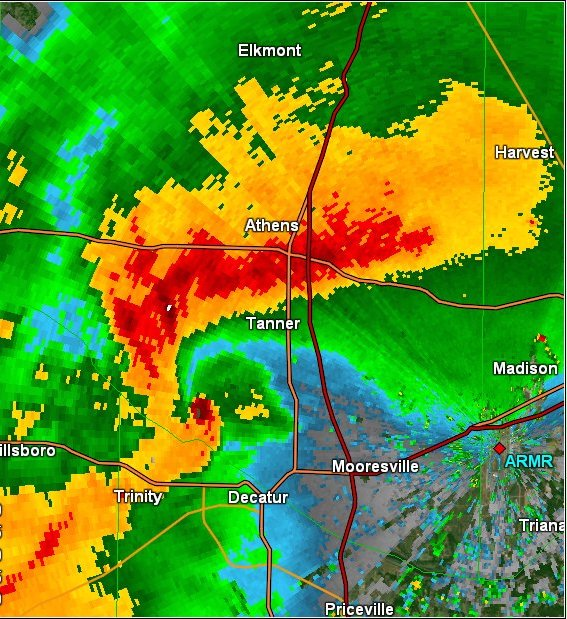
A radar imagery of the 2011 Hackleburg-Phil Campbell tornado as it is approaching Tanner.

On April 3, 1974, during the 1974 Super Outbreak, two violent stovepipe tornadoes that were both one-third of a mile in width hit the community within 30 minutes during the early nighttime hours. Both tornadoes were rated F5 on the Fujita Scale. After the first tornado passed through the area, a second tornado surprised the rescue effort. In total, 50 were killed by the violent tornadoes.

On April 27, 2011, during the 2011 Super Outbreak, Tanner and other surrounding communities were hit by a large EF5 tornado. The wedge tornado, which was over 1 mile (1.6 km) wide, killed four people in Limestone County and 72 people overall, marking it as the deadliest tornado in Alabama history. It was the third F5 or EF5 tornado to strike Tanner and the surrounding communities in Limestone County.

== Climate ==
The climate in this area is characterized by hot, humid summers and generally mild to cool winters. According to the Köppen Climate Classification system, Tanner has a humid subtropical climate, abbreviated "Cfa" on climate maps.

== Notable people ==
- Reshard Langford, professional football safety
- Gary Redus, Former MLB player (Cincinnati Reds, Philadelphia Phillies, Chicago White Sox, Pittsburgh Pirates, Texas Rangers)
- Rocky Roberts, singer
