= Lou Raymond =

American baseball player (1894-1979)

- Second baseman
- Born: December 11, 1894; Buffalo, New York
- Died: May 2, 1979 (aged 84); Rochester, New York
- Batted: Right Threw: Right

MLB debut
- May 2, 1919, for the Philadelphia Phillies

Last MLB appearance
- May 2, 1919, for the Philadelphia Phillies

MLB statistics
- Batting average: .500
- Hits: 1
- Stats at Baseball Reference

Teams
- Philadelphia Phillies (1919)

Louis Anthony "Lou" Raymond (December 11, 1894 – May 2, 1979) was a professional baseball player. In a two-year professional career, Raymond, a second baseman, appeared in Major League Baseball during the 1919 season, playing one game as a member of the National League's Philadelphia Phillies. He was officially listed as standing 5 feet 10 inches (178 cm) and weighing 187 pounds (85 kg).

== Biography ==
Raymond was born Louis Anthony Raymondjack on December 11, 1894, in Buffalo, New York.

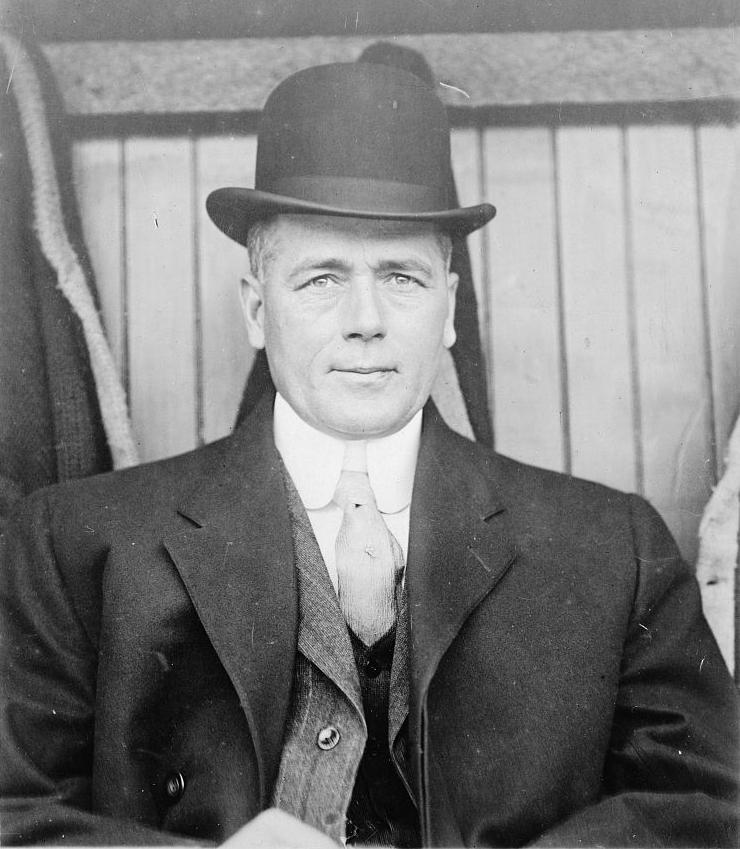
Patsy Donovan was one of Raymond's minor league managers in 1918.

Raymond began his professional play as a member of the International League (IL), appearing for the Double-A Syracuse Stars, who later moved during the season and became the Hamilton Tigers (Hamilton, Ontario). He also played a portion of the year for the Rochester Hustlers. Managed in part by Patsy Donovan, Raymond posted a .293 batting average for the entire IL season, with 89 hits in 304 at-bats. Of his hits, 17 went for extra bases—11 were doubles and 6 were triples.

In 1919, Raymond advanced from the minor leagues to the majors, appearing with the Philadelphia Phillies, of Major League Baseball's National League (NL). That season, the Phillies posted a 47–90 win–loss record, finishing 47 1/2 games behind the Cincinnati Reds, last in the NL. Raymond's contribution to the team was a single hit, which came in his only major league game. On May 2, he made his debut against the New York Giants, replacing starter Possum Whitted at second base and collecting two at-bats. With one hit in his short appearance, Raymond completed his major league career with a batting average of .500.

After his baseball career, Raymond became a police officer in Rochester, New York. He retired in July 1963, according to Baseball Digest, after that magazine declared him a "missing player." He offered a $2,500 prize for locating information about those players in the archives of the Baseball Hall of Fame. Raymond died in Rochester on May 2, 1979.

== See also ==
- Philadelphia Phillies all-time roster (R)
- Cup of coffee
