= Tanner High School =

Coordinates: 34°43′59.37″N 86°58′24.96″W

Location
- 12060 Sommers Road; Tanner, Limestone County, Alabama 35671; United States

Information
- Type: Public
- School district: Limestone County School District
- CEEB code: 012605
- Principal: Maurice Shingleton
- Staff: 28.50 (FTE)
- Grades: K-12
- Student to teacher ratio: 16.28
- Hours in school day: ~9
- Colors: Green and white
- Team name: Rattlers
- Website: www.tannerhigh.org

Tanner High School is a K–12 school located in Tanner, Alabama. It is a part of the Limestone County School District.

== Athletics ==
On December 7, 2012, the Tanner Rattlers Football team made history by winning its first 2A Championship. The Rattlers beat the Washington County Bulldogs 28 to 14. On December 6, 2013, the Rattlers won their second 2A state championship in a rematch against the Washington County Bulldogs 21 to 13. Oscar Bonds is the current head coach.

The school's basketball boys and girls teams both won state titles in 1985 and 2011 and are the only school in Alabama to do so. The current head coaches are Dale Taylor (boys) and Jordan Paul (girls).

== Notable alumni ==
- Reshard Langford, NFL player (Washington Redskins, Philadelphia Eagles)
- Gary Redus, Former MLB player (Cincinnati Reds, Philadelphia Phillies, Chicago White Sox, Pittsburgh Pirates, Texas Rangers)
- Henry A. White, Alabama state representative and educator
