= Reshard Langford =

American gridiron football player (born 1986)

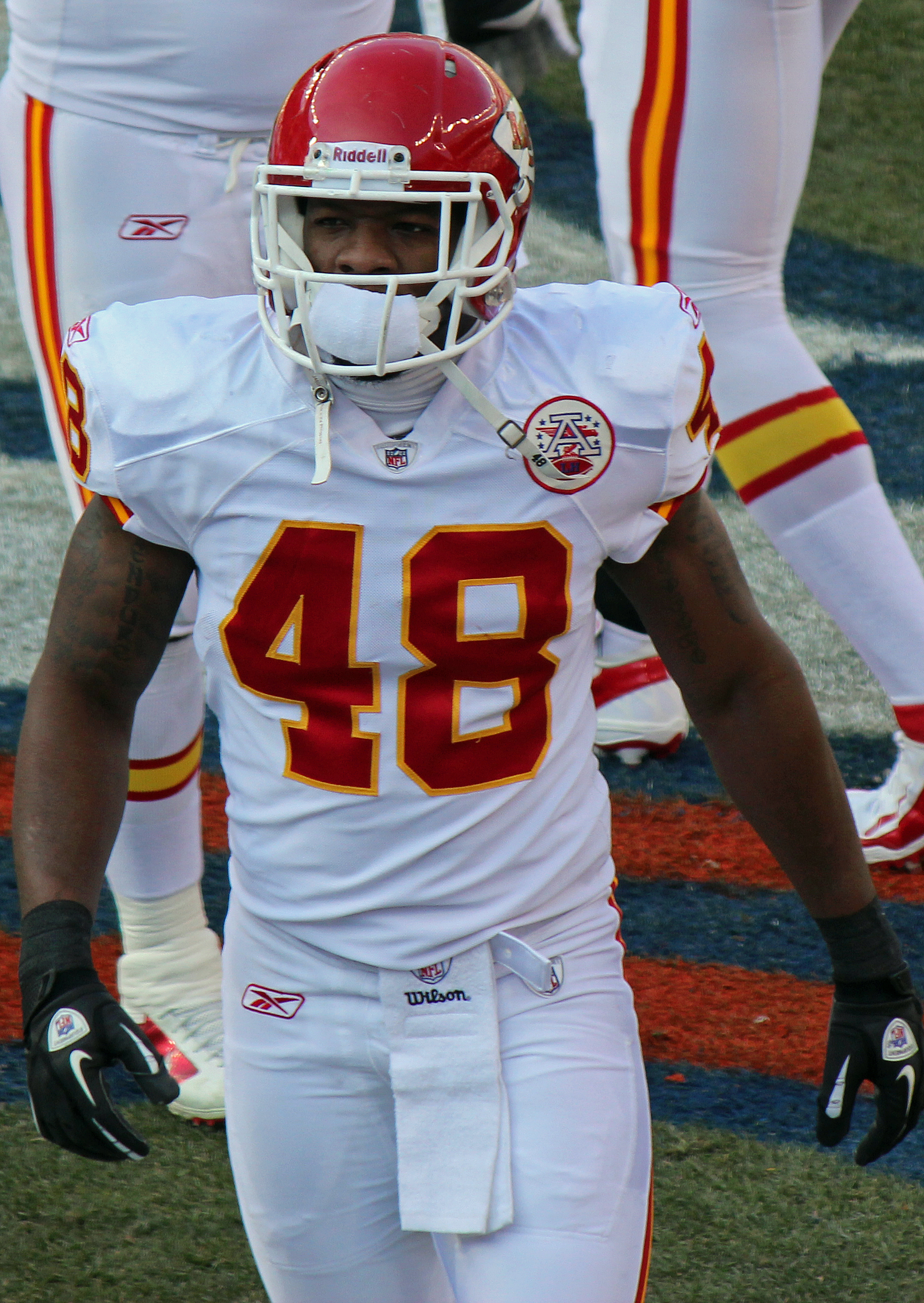
- Langford with the Chiefs in 2011

Chicago Bears
- Title: Assistant strength and conditioning

Personal information
- Born: February 6, 1986 (age 40); Tanner, Alabama, U.S.
- Listed height: 6 ft 1 in (1.85 m)
- Listed weight: 213 lb (97 kg)

Career information
- Position: Defensive back (No. 48)
- College: Vanderbilt
- NFL draft: 2009: undrafted

Career history

Playing
- Philadelphia Eagles (2009)*; Kansas City Chiefs (2009–2011); Detroit Lions (2012)*; Saskatchewan Roughriders (2013)*
- * Offseason or practice squad member only

Coaching
- Minnesota Vikings (2017–2018) Assistant strength and conditioning; Chicago Bears (2025–present) Assistant strength and conditioning

Awards and highlights
- First-team Freshman All-SEC (2005)

Career NFL statistics
- Total tackles: 17
- Stats at Pro Football Reference

Reshard Nelson Langford (born February 6, 1986) is an American professional football coach and former player is an assistant strength and conditioning coach with the Chicago Bears of the National Football League (NFL). He played in the NFL as safety for the Kansas City Chiefs.

After playing college football for Vanderbilt, Langford signed with the Philadelphia Eagles as an undrafted free agent in 2009. He was also a member of the Detroit Lions and Saskatchewan Roughriders.

== Early life ==
Langford was born to Ricky and Delphine Langford and attended Tanner High School in Tanner, Alabama. Langford lettered in football, basketball, baseball and track and field. In football, he was a three-year starter at running back and safety. After his senior season, he was named a 2A First-team All-State defensive back and All-Region. He rushed for 1,459 yards as a senior, averaging 9.7 yards per carry and 30 touchdowns. On defense, Langford intercepted 3 passes and made 59 tackles. As a junior, he rushed for 1,351 yards and 15 touchdowns. He returned a punt and an interception for touchdowns during his junior season. In basketball, he was a two-time All-Region pick as a forward and center. In track, he placed in four events as a junior.

== College career ==
Langford played college football at Vanderbilt University from 2004 to 2008. He started all four years for the Commodores as a safety. He made 247 career tackles and eleven interceptions. During his senior season, he was named team captain, and twice earned the team's most valuable defensive back award. He was named to the All-SEC freshman team in 2005.

== Professional career ==
=== Pre-draft ===
Pre-draft measurables
Height	Weight	40-yard dash	10-yard split	20-yard split	20-yard shuttle	Three-cone drill	Vertical jump	Broad jump	Bench press
6 ft 1 1/8 in (1.86 m)	212 lb (96 kg)	4.68 s	1.62 s	2.69 s	4.23 s	7.17 s	38.0 in (0.97 m)	10 ft 3 in (3.12 m)	17 reps
All values from Pro Day

After his senior season at Vanderbilt, he was rated as the 13th best safety available in the 2009 NFL draft by Gil Brandt.

=== Philadelphia Eagles ===
Langford signed with the Philadelphia Eagles after being undrafted in the 2009 NFL draft on April 27, 2009. He was waived on September 5, 2009, and signed to the team's practice squad on September 7.

=== Kansas City Chiefs ===
Langford was signed off the Eagles' practice squad by the Kansas City Chiefs on December 25, 2009, and added to the 53-man active roster but did not appear in any games. He appeared in 6 games the following season and then in 11 games during the 2011 season, 2 of which he was a starter at the strong safety position.

=== Detroit Lions ===
Langford spent the 2012 NFL season as a member of the Detroit Lions. He did not appear in any games after suffering a calf injury in the preseason and was subsequently waived after the team reached an injury settlement.

=== Saskatchewan Roughriders ===
On May 17, 2013, Langford signed with the Saskatchewan Roughriders of the Canadian Football League. He was released during final roster cuts on June 22, 2013.

== Personal life ==
Langford has a younger brother, Marquis. Langford's first job was at Green Briar, a barbecue restaurant, where he was a busboy. He grew up as a fan of the Denver Broncos and Chicago Bulls. Langford majored in sociology at Vanderbilt University.
