= Chuck Ricci =

American baseball player (born 1968)

- Pitcher
- Born: November 20, 1968 (age 57); Abington, Pennsylvania, U.S.
- Batted: Right Threw: Right

MLB debut
- September 8, 1995, for the Philadelphia Phillies

Last MLB appearance
- October 1, 1995, for the Philadelphia Phillies

MLB statistics
- Win–loss record: 1–0
- Earned run average: 1.80
- Strikeouts: 9
- Stats at Baseball Reference

Teams
- Philadelphia Phillies (1995)

Charles Mark Ricci (born November 20, 1968) is an American former professional baseball player. During an 11-season professional career, Ricci appeared in Major League Baseball (MLB) during one year, pitching for the National League's Philadelphia Phillies in 1995. He was listed as standing 6 feet 2 inches (188 cm) and weighing 180 pounds (82 kg).

Having played for eleven different minor league teams affiliated with five major league franchises (Baltimore Orioles, Phillies, Boston Red Sox, Oakland Athletics, and Montreal Expos), Ricci also appeared as a member of the Cleveland Indians in the 1994 film Major League II; although he never played for the Indians, he worked for the franchise as a scout after retiring as a player.

== High school and draft ==
Ricci graduated in 1987 from Shawnee High School in Medford, New Jersey. In the 1987 Major League Baseball draft, he was selected in the fourth round by the Baltimore Orioles, the first player drafted by a Major League Baseball club in Shawnee's history. Ricci was offered a full scholarship to the University of Hawaii, but chose to begin his professional career.

== Early career ==
=== 1987–1990 ===
The Orioles assigned Ricci to the rookie-league Bluefield Orioles in West Virginia, where he began his career by playing two seasons. For the Appalachian League club, he collected a 5–5 win–loss record, averaging 6.50 earned runs per game in his 13 appearances (12 starts). His five victories were tied for the second-highest total on the team, and he allowed a team-high 11 home runs in his appearances. He struck out 40 batters in 62 1/3 innings pitched, walking 38. The next season, Ricci amassed a 4–6 record and a 6.66 earned run average (ERA), the club's second-worst mark. He played in 14 games, all starts, and struck out 73 batters in a like number of innings, allowing 48 bases on balls.

In 1989, Ricci was promoted to the A-level Waterloo Diamonds, an unaffiliated team at the time. He increased his number of appearances from the previous year more than twofold, starting 25 of his 29 games and completing 9 of those contests. Ricci pitched a career-high 181 1/3 innings that season, posting a 10–12 record; his loss total was tied for the team high in that category. He was third on the team, and tops among the regular starters, in ERA, with a 2.98 mark, and walked 59 batters while striking out 89. After advancing to the Frederick Keys for the 1990 season, Ricci again led that team with 12 defeats, as compared to his 7 victories. His ERA rose to 4.41, but his strikeout-to-walk ratio improved to 97:49. In June of that year, Ricci pitched a complete-game shutout of the Prince William Cannons, winning 5–0.

=== 1991–1993 ===
The 1991 season saw Ricci continue with the Keys, when he earned a 12–14 record, leading the team in both wins and losses. His 173 2/3 innings pitched were the team's highest total—as were his 90 runs allowed—and his 144 strikeouts were second to Kip Yaughn. Ricci split the 1992 season between Frederick and the AA-level Hagerstown Suns, spending more time at the latter. He began to transition to the bullpen with Hagerstown, making only 6 starts in 20 appearances. Ricci pitched 57 2/3 innings for the Suns, amassing a 5.77 ERA and a 1–4 record. The Bowie Baysox became the Orioles' Eastern League affiliate in 1993, and Ricci played most of that season with them; he won seven games and lost four, amassing a 3.20 ERA. He struck out 83 batters against 20 walks in 81 2/3 innings, but was granted free agency in October of that year.

== Later years ==
=== 1994–1995 ===
On April 7, 1994, the Philadelphia Phillies signed Ricci to a contract, assigning him to the double-A Reading Phillies. He recorded one victory for Reading, allowing no runs in 14 innings pitched. Earning a promotion to Triple-A Scranton/Wilkes-Barre, Ricci earned four more wins against three losses, collecting a 4.04 ERA. On the season, he amassed six saves, striking out 95 batters while walking 26 of the 345 he faced that year. During the 1994 season, Ricci also appeared in the film Major League II as one of the Cleveland Indians baseball players.

Ricci duplicated his Red Barons record the next season, posting a 4–3 mark in 1995. His 2.49 ERA was the best on the team among players making more than 10 appearances, and he led all International League pitchers with 68 games played. Striking out 66 batters in 65 innings, Ricci finished 48 games for Scranton/Wilkes-Barre, saving 25 of them, by far the team's highest total that season. After the International League season concluded, Ricci was promoted to the major league club.

==== Major league career ====
Ricci began his Phillies career with his longest appearance, pitching three innings against the Houston Astros on September 8, 1995. In his debut, he walked two batters (John Cangelosi and Andy Stankiewicz), struck out one (Jeff Bagwell), and allowed one earned run and two hits, with the score coming on a sacrifice fly by Ricky Gutiérrez. Ricci's next appearance also came against the Astros, when he threw a perfect 2/3 inning two days later. Against the rival New York Mets on September 15, Ricci was chosen to complete the game in a 4–1 Phillies defeat; he allowed two hits and struck out one batter, lowering his ERA to 1.93. In a 13–10 victory over the Florida Marlins on September 18, Ricci pitched a portion of the third inning and all of the fourth, striking out three of the five batters he faced and hitting one.

Ricci earned his only major league victory on September 23 against the Cincinnati Reds, becoming the beneficiary of three ninth-inning walks by Xavier Hernandez, including the winning run walked in from the bases loaded with two outs. The next night, he faced the Reds again, allowing a run on a Hal Morris double in the ninth inning of a 6–4 loss. His final appearance came against the Marlins in Florida, when he allowed two hits and a walk in two innings pitched, striking out three batters on October 1. Despite finishing his short stint with an undefeated record and a 1.80 ERA, Ricci was released into free agency at the end of the 1995 season.

=== 1996–1997 ===
In 1996, Ricci began play with the Pawtucket Red Sox of the International League, posting a career-best .667 winning percentage (8–4 record). His 3.01 ERA was best among the PawSox pitchers with more than 15 appearances, and his 13 saves were a team high. Ricci pitched 80 2/3 innings that season, walking 32 and striking out 79. In 1997, he split his appearances between the Oakland Athletics-affiliated Edmonton Trappers, where he notched a 16.88 ERA in four games, and the Ottawa Lynx, a Montreal Expos affiliate, for whom he won 2 games and lost 2 in 22 appearances. For Ottawa, Ricci pitched 27 innings, striking out 27, walking 25, and allowing 22 hits.

== After retirement ==
After leaving baseball as a player, Ricci worked for the Indians as a scout from 2000 to 2003. He later co-founded The Athlete's Edge, an organization offering baseball clinics for private and group instruction. As of 2011, Ricci was the Indians' national cross-checker in their scouting department and he lived in Greencastle, Pennsylvania.

Ricci now works for the Tampa Bay Rays as a national cross checker. On October 28, 2022, Ricci was promoted to the role of director of amateur scouting.

== See also ==
- Philadelphia Phillies all-time roster (R)
