= Alabama's 5th House of Representatives district =

American legislative district

Alabama's 5th State House of Representatives district
Representative
Danny Crawford; R–Athens
- Demographics: 83.1% White; 9.9% Black; 0.6% Asian; 0.6% Native American; 0.0% Hawaiian/Pacific Islander; 4% Other
- Population (2010) • Voting age • Citizens of voting age: 48,495; 18; 75.8%

Alabama's 5th House of Representatives district is one of 105 districts in the Alabama House of Representatives. Its current representative is Danny Crawford. It was created in 1967 and encompasses parts of Limestone County. As of the 2010 census, the district has a population of 48,495, with 75.8% being of legal voting age.

== List of representatives ==
Representative	Party	Term start	Term end	Electoral history	Represented counties	Ref.
District created		January 3, 1967				
Bryce Graham	Democrat	January 3, 1967	January 3, 1971	Elected in 1966		
Data unavailable.		January 3, 1971	January 3, 1975	Elected in 1970		
Paul J. Weeks	Democrat	January 3, 1975	January 3, 1979	Elected in 1974		
Wayne Cobb	Democrat	January 3, 1979	January 3, 1983	Elected in 1978.		
Jack Lauderdale	Democrat	January 3, 1983	January 3, 1984	Elected in 1982.		
Tommy Carter	Democrat	January 3, 1984	January 3, 2007	Elected in 1983. Re-elected in 1986. Re-elected in 1990. Re-elected in 1994. Re-elected in 1998. Re-elected in 2002.		
Henry A. White	Democrat	January 3, 2007	January 3, 2011	Elected in 2006.		
Dan Williams	Republican	January 3, 2011	July 1, 2015	Elected in 2010.		
Dan Williams	Republican	January 3, 2011	July 1, 2015	Re-elected in 2014. Died.	Limestone County	
Vacant		July 1, 2015	February 17, 2016		Limestone County	
Danny Crawford	Republican	February 17, 2016	Incumbent	Elected in 2016. Re-elected in 2018.	Limestone County	
