= Danny Crawford (politician) =

American politician

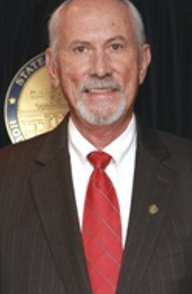

Member of the Alabama House of Representatives from the 5th district
- Incumbent
- Assumed office February 17, 2016
- Preceded by: Dan Williams

Personal details
- Born: June 6, 1950 (age 76) Belle Mina, Alabama, U.S.
- Party: Republican
- Spouse: Mary Kay
- Children: 1
- Profession: Crop insurance contractor

Danny F. Crawford (born June 6, 1950) is an American politician. He is a member of the Alabama House of Representatives from the 5th District, serving since 2016. He is a member of the Republican Party.
