= Dan Williams (Alabama politician) =

American politician

Member of the Alabama House of Representatives from the 5th district
- In office January 3, 2011 – July 1, 2015
- Preceded by: Henry A. White
- Succeeded by: Danny Crawford

Mayor of Athens, Alabama
- In office 1992 – November 2010
- Preceded by: ?
- Succeeded by: Ronnie Marks

Personal details
- Born: James Daniel Williams; June 6, 1942 Limestone County, Alabama, U.S.
- Died: July 1, 2015 (aged 73) Athens, Alabama, U.S.
- Party: Republican

James Daniel Williams (June 6, 1942 – July 1, 2015) was an American politician.

Born in Limestone County, Alabama, Williams went to Auburn University and served in the Alabama National Guard. He was a member of the Alabama House of Representatives from the 5th District, serving from 2011 to 2015. He was a member of the Republican party. From 1992 to 2010, he was mayor of Athens, Alabama. Williams also served on the Athens City Council and the Athens Board of Education. He died of leukemia at his home in Athens, Alabama on July 1, 2015.
