= Elkmont High School =

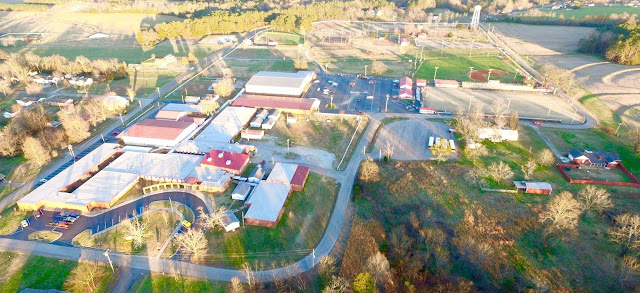
- Elkmont High School, Elkmont, Alabama

Location
- 25630 Evans Ave; Elkmont, Alabama 35620; United States; 34°55′52″N 86°58′11″W

Information
- Type: Public
- Established: 1912; 114 years ago
- CEEB code: 053404
- Principal: Graham Aderholt
- Teaching staff: 34.00 (on an FTE basis)
- Grades: 6–12
- Enrollment: 619 (2023-2024)
- Student to teacher ratio: 18.20
- Hours in school day: 8
- Colors: Red, Black, and white
- Team name: The Red Devils
- Website: www.elkmonthigh.org

Elkmont High School is a public school in Elkmont, Alabama, United States and is one of six schools in the Limestone Country School District.

== History ==
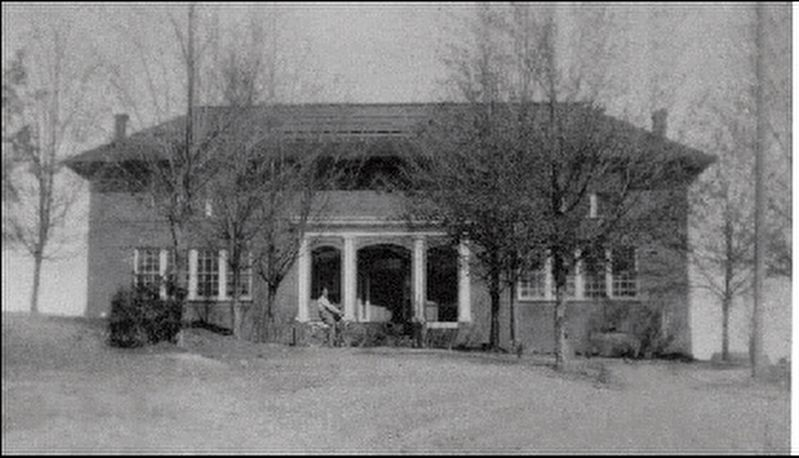
The original school building, built in 1912, was demolished in 1967.

On September 28, 1912, the Limestone County High School in Elkmont, Alabama, prepared to open for its first term with a newly completed building. To fund seating for the school, local women organized an auction in which a cake was sold for $198, with Miss Nichols being voted the most popular young lady as part of the event. The school would be the county's first public school.

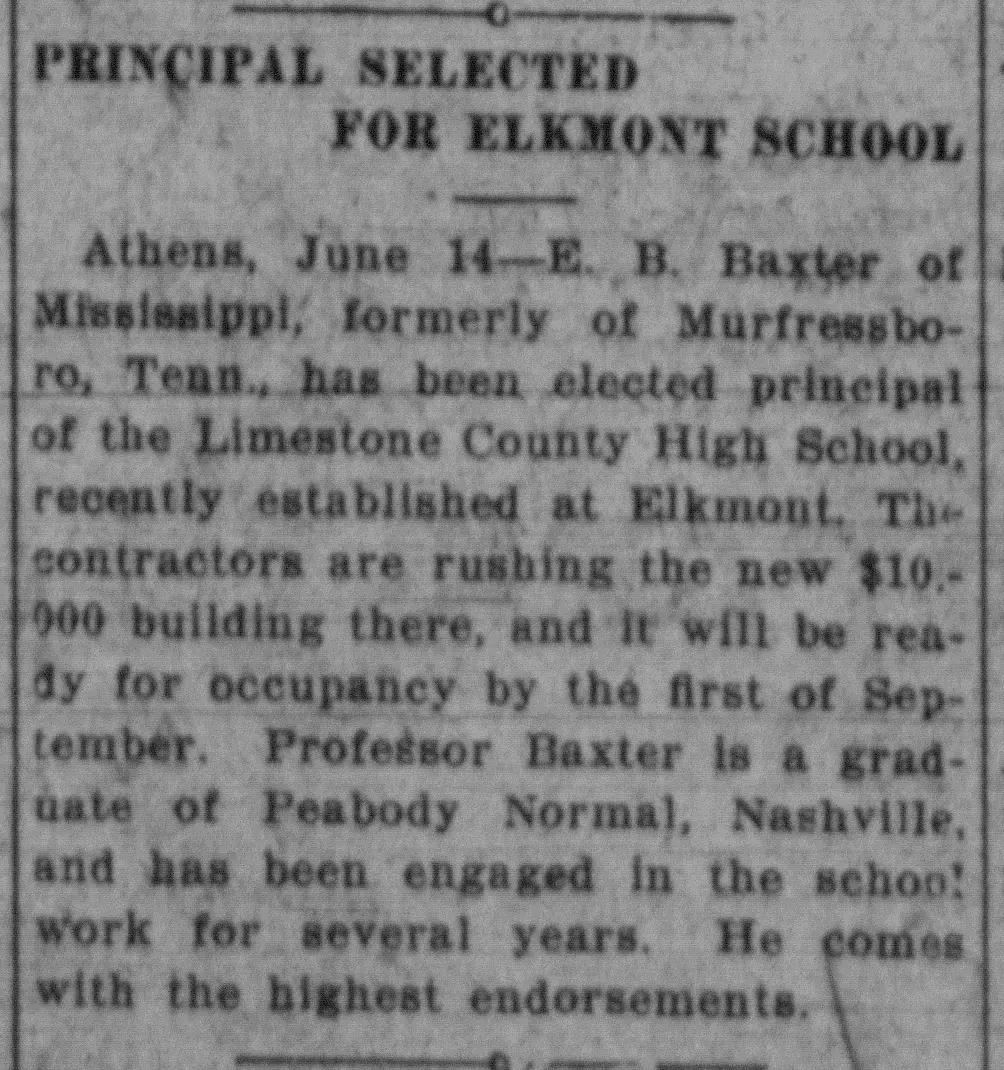
Professor Baxter hired

Professor E.B. Baxter served as President of the school with his assistants, Professor Baker and Miss Lilian Barksdale.

The original building was located on Evans Street where Elkmont High School is now. Willis B. Vaughn was instrumental in the establishment of the school.

On March 19, 1915, the high school was part of the high school debating league in Alabama and participated in a debate tournament with Morgan County High School. The topic of debate that day was "Resolved, That Women's Suffrage Should Be Established By Constitutional Amendment in Alabama."

In 1930, the Decatur Daily referred to the school as "Elkmont County High School."

In 1935, a brick elementary school and its attached auditorium were erected on the grounds that are now occupied by the present-day football stadium.

A powerful tornado tore through the high school in 1938, leaving the upper floor too dangerous for use. To continue their education, high school students attended classes in the elementary school auditorium. After a year of adjustments, they finally returned to a remodeled, single-story high school in the fall of 1939.

On September 18, 1941, an all-day singing event planned by the County Singing Association at Elkmont High School was indefinitely postponed due to health concerns related to a polio outbreak. County health officials advised delaying the event, with plans to reschedule once cooler weather arrived and the polio threat subsided.

In 1942, a fire consumed the elementary school, forcing students and teachers to relocate to local churches for the following year and a half. A new school, complete with the first dedicated lunchroom, opened in the fall of 1943 on the future site of the 1998 gym. Tragically, this building also succumbed to fire in 1968. Meanwhile, in 1947, a sturdy brick gymnasium was added to the school campus.

The year 1949 marked the construction of a combination lunchroom and Civic Center, as well as the publication of EHS’s first yearbook. A few years later, in 1955, the present vocational building was added.

In 1960, an addition to Elkmont High School was approved as part of a broader school improvement initiative in Limestone County, Alabama. The project, authorized by the Alabama Education Authority, included the construction of four new classrooms and a library at Elkmont High School, with a total estimated cost of $79,067. Superintendent of Education George Roberts announced the approval during a meeting of the county Board of Education, stating that the funding came from Limestone County’s allocation of the state’s $100 million school construction bond issue. The addition expanded Elkmont High School’s facilities to include a total of 12 classrooms and a library. Preliminary blueprints were in the hands of architects at the time, and bids for the construction were expected to be sought later. This project was part of a broader educational infrastructure improvement effort that also included the construction of a new building for Ardmore School.

Between 1962 and 1972, Elkmont High School underwent significant expansion. In 1962, a new addition was made to the high school, forming part of the main building still in use today. A larger gym was completed in 1965. The school introduced its first band program in 1966, followed by the construction of a dedicated band room in 1967. That same year, the original single-story structure was demolished and replaced with a new high school building, now the front section of the current school complex. In 1968, an elementary school was built across the street. By 1972, a new lunchroom was constructed, which has since been repurposed as the library.

In April 1973, the U.S. Attorney's office in Birmingham confirmed that accusations against Elkmont High School Principal Frank Dawson, submitted by David Dunnavant and other residents of Elkmont, were being reviewed for a possible investigation. U.S. Attorney Mrs. Arthur Gaston stated that her office had gathered information related to the case and was determining whether it fell under their jurisdiction. The controversy had begun months earlier when Dawson sent students home for dress code violations, which led to growing concerns among parents and community members. Allegations emerged that Dawson had misused government funds, mistreated students, and improperly handled federal money allocated for the National Youth Corps program. Several students claimed they had been required to work on Dawson's farm and were only compensated through the youth corps funds. In response to these accusations, the Limestone County Board of Education pledged to investigate both the dress code enforcement and the broader claims against Dawson. Meanwhile, public opinion remained divided; a recent board meeting saw 273 people gather at the high school to show support for Dawson, and the town council passed a resolution endorsing him. However, those seeking Dawson’s removal persisted, and their visit to the U.S. Attorney’s office last week marked the second attempt by Elkmont residents to press for his ouster before federal officials.

In 1982, the band room was remodeled, and a special education building—now the kindergarten building—was added. The science wing followed in 1989. In 1990, Limestone County High School earned accreditation from the Southern Association of Schools and Colleges. The school expanded in 1995 with a new lunchroom and an elementary wing. Two years later, a modern, air-conditioned gym replaced the original 1947 gym.

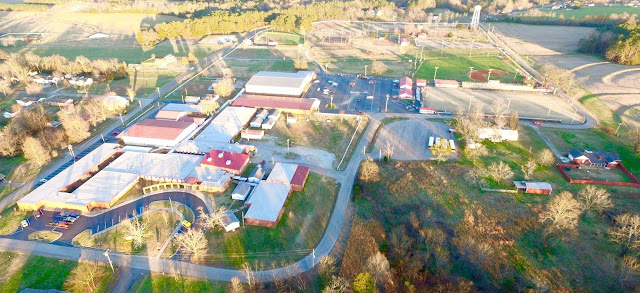
EHS campus from the air

In 2003, the school offices underwent a major renovation, including a new entrance on the west side of campus.

A full interior makeover in 2016 brought fresh paint, new bathrooms, ceilings, lighting, and flooring. By 2017-2018, Elkmont Elementary and Elkmont High officially became separate schools.

== Athletics ==
=== Football ===
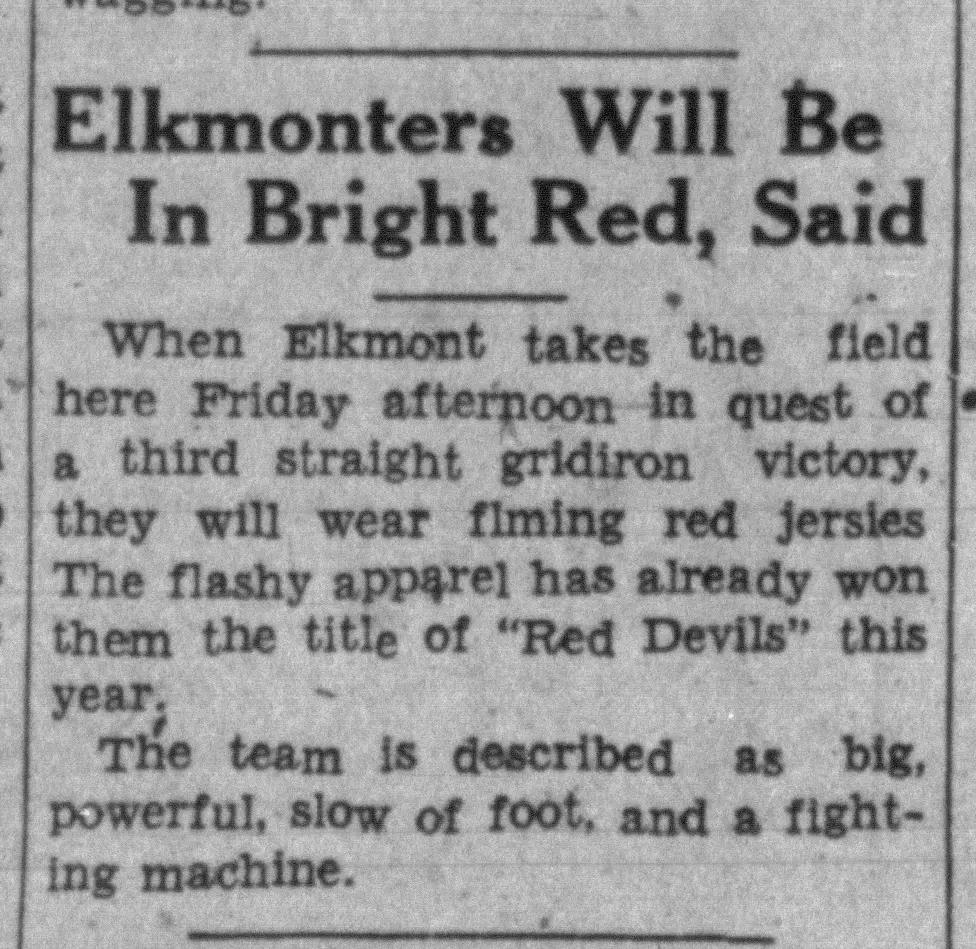
Origin of the "Red Devils"

On September 22, 1931, the Elkmont High School football team earned the nickname "Red Devils" after adopting bright red jerseys that stood out on the field. The team was described as big, powerful, slow of foot, and a relentless fighting machine, further solidifying the identity associated with their bold new look.

On October 17, 1931, Elkmont School beat Athens High School in a last second touchdown. The article reads "ELKTON SCORES IN THE LAST SECONDS. Elkmont High School football warriors scored on a 7-0 decision over the Athens High School team Friday afternoon at Athens, scoring in the final 5 seconds of the game. With the score standing in deadlock, Elkton took the ball on her own 15 yard line and as the play was reeled off the time-keeper's whistle blew. The play was completed and Birdsong took the ball off-tackle and sprinted 85 yards up the field for a touchdown. Elkton kicked goal. The game was one of the best seen in Athens this year."

Elkmont entered the 1937 season with optimism after a strong 1936 record, winning several games and losing only two. The team had a reputation for being light in weight but relied on agility and trick plays to compensate for this disadvantage. Sidney Johnston, the principal of Elkmont High School at the time, stated that the team was "shifty and full of tricks," making them a formidable opponent despite their smaller size.

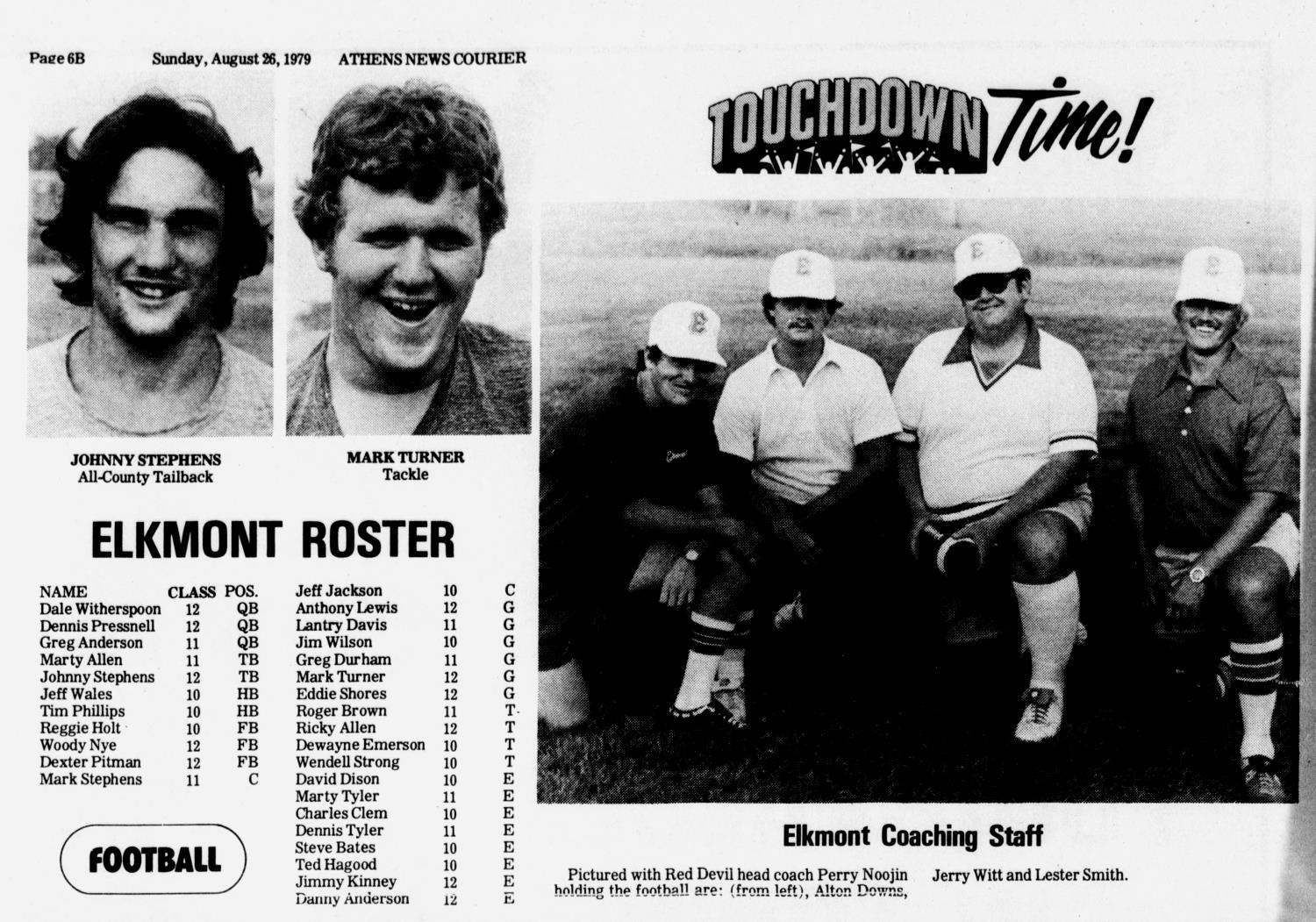
1979 Elkmont Football Roster & Coaching Staff

The 1979 Elkmont Red Devil football team, under Coach Perry Noojin, finished the regular season undefeated and participated in the 2A state football playoffs for the first time ever.

=== Basketball ===
During the 1997-98 basketball season, the Elkmont Red Devils delivered a powerhouse performance under the leadership of head coach Steve Britton and All-State star senior guard Danny Anderson. Dominating the competition, Elkmont racked up an impressive 28-3 record, capping off the season with a deep playoff run that solidified their place among the state's elite teams.

=== Softball ===
Under the leadership of Limestone County Sports Hall of Fame member, Coach Mary Jane Hobbs, the Lady Devils softball team have won six Area Championships (2008, 2010, 2015, 2018, 2019, & 2022) and have been to two Final Fours (2008 & 2010).

== Leadership ==
Previous Principals have included E. B. Baxter, Frank Dawson, Steve Pettus (early 1990s - 2003), Jerry Witt (2004), Mickey Glass (2005–2011), Stan Davis (2011–2013), Garth Garris (2013–2015), Bill Tribble (2016–2020), Elizabeth Cantrell (2020-2022), and Tim Wyant (2022–2023)

== Notable alumni ==
- The Delmore Brothers
- Michael Boley, former NFL player
