= Limestone County School District =

School district in Alabama

Limestone County Schools

Address
- 300 South Jefferson Street Athens, Alabama, 35611; United States

District information
- Grades: PK-12
- Superintendent: Randy Shearouse
- Schools: 13
- NCES District ID: 102100

Students and staff
- Students: 8,884
- Teachers: 476
- Staff: 542
- Student–teacher ratio: 18.64

Other information
- Website: www.lcsk12.org

Limestone County School District is a school district in Limestone County, Alabama, United States. The school is headquartered in Athens, Alabama.

Communities in the district include Ardmore, Elkmont, Lester, and Mooresville. Some parcels of Huntsville are in the Limestone district.

== History ==
In 2011 the American Civil Liberties Union (ACLU) informed Barry Carroll, the superintendent, that a parent complained that Bibles had been distributed within the past three months on multiple occasions at one of the district's elementary schools. Carroll said that the allegations were "inaccurate or false."

== Student discipline and faculty policies ==
The district has a zero tolerance policy towards fighting. The minimum punishment for a student is suspension from school.

As of 2005 the school district limits teacher usage of the internet. This occurred after the district discovered employees visiting non-educational websites and paying personal bills online. Meg McCaffrey of the School Library Journal said that the policy makes the job of a school librarian more difficult. Susan Kluger, a librarian at Cedar Hill Elementary School, said that the policy made it more difficult to teach students about internet websites that are safe to visit.

== Schools ==
High schools

- Ardmore High School
- Clements High School
- East Limestone High School
- Elkmont High School
- Tanner High School
- West Limestone High School

Elementary schools

- Blue Springs Elementary School
- Cedar Hill Elementary School
- Creekside Elementary School
- Elkmont Elementary School
- Johnson Elementary School
- Owens Elementary School
- Piney Chapel Elementary School
- Sugar Creek Elementary School
- Tanner Elementary School

Other

- Limestone County Career Technical Center
