= Lester, Alabama =

- Town
- Location of Lester in Limestone County, Alabama.
- Coordinates: 34°59′14″N 87°09′05″W
- Country: United States
- State: Alabama
- County: Limestone

Area
  - Total: 1.91 sq mi (4.95 km^{2})
  - Land: 1.91 sq mi (4.95 km^{2})
  - Water: 0.0039 sq mi (0.01 km^{2})
- Elevation: 774 ft (236 m)

Population (2020)
  - Total: 111
  - Density: 58.1/sq mi (22.44/km^{2})
- Time zone: UTC-6 (Central (CST))
  - Summer (DST): UTC-5 (CDT)
- ZIP code: 35647
- Area code: 256
- FIPS code: 01-42352
- GNIS feature ID: 2406007

Lester is a town in Limestone County, Alabama, United States, and is included in the Huntsville-Decatur Combined Statistical Area. As of the 2020 census, Lester had a population of 111.

== Geography ==
According to the U.S. Census Bureau, the town has a total area of 1.8 square miles (4.7 km^{2}), all land.

== Demographics ==
Historical population
Census	Pop.	Note	%±
1970	70		—
1980	117		67.1%
1990	89		−23.9%
2000	107		20.2%
2010	111		3.7%
2020	111		0.0%
U.S. Decennial Census; 2013 Estimate

As of the census of 2000, there were 107 people, 42 households, and 33 families residing in the town. The population density was 58.4 inhabitants per square mile (22.5/km^{2}). There were 46 housing units at an average density of 25.1 per square mile (9.7/km^{2}). The racial makeup of the town was 100.00% White.

There were 42 households, out of which 33.3% had children under the age of 18 living with them, 69.0% were married couples living together, 7.1% had a female householder with no husband present, and 21.4% were non-families. 16.7% of all households were made up of individuals, and 9.5% had someone living alone who was 65 years of age or older. The average household size was 2.55 and the average family size was 2.85.

In the town, the population was spread out, with 24.3% under the age of 18, 5.6% from 18 to 24, 31.8% from 25 to 44, 28.0% from 45 to 64, and 10.3% who were 65 years of age or older. The median age was 34 years. For every 100 females, there were 101.9 males. For every 100 females age 18 and over, there were 97.6 males.

The median income for a household in the town was $37,083, and the median income for a family was $44,688. Males had a median income of $31,250 versus $14,643 for females. The per capita income for the town was $16,073. There were no families and 7.0% of the population living below the poverty line, including no under eighteens and 22.2% of those over 64.

== Education ==
It is in the Limestone County School District.
