= Gary Redus =

American baseball player (born 1956)

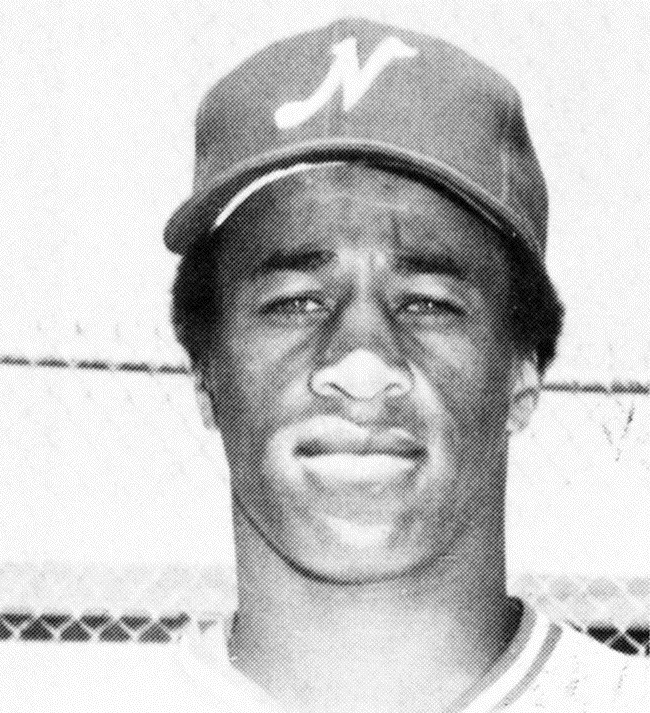
- Redus with the Nashville Sounds in 1979
- Outfielder
- Born: November 1, 1956 (age 70); Athens, Alabama, U.S.
- Batted: Right Threw: Right

MLB debut
- September 7, 1982, for the Cincinnati Reds

Last MLB appearance
- July 23, 1994, for the Texas Rangers

MLB statistics
- Batting average: .252
- Home runs: 90
- Runs batted in: 352
- Stolen bases: 322
- Stats at Baseball Reference

Teams
- Cincinnati Reds (1982–1985); Philadelphia Phillies (1986); Chicago White Sox (1987–1988); Pittsburgh Pirates (1988–1992); Texas Rangers (1993–1994)

Gary Eugene Redus (born November 1, 1956) is an American former professional baseball outfielder who played in Major League Baseball (MLB) for the Cincinnati Reds, Philadelphia Phillies, Chicago White Sox, Pittsburgh Pirates, and Texas Rangers.

== Career ==
=== High school ===
Redus, a star at Tanner High School in Alabama, was selected by the Boston Red Sox in the 17th round of the 1977 MLB draft after playing at Calhoun Community College but he did not sign, opting to attend Athens State University. In 1977, he played collegiate summer baseball with the Cotuit Kettleers of the Cape Cod Baseball League.

=== Professional ===
==== Cincinnati Reds ====
The Cincinnati Reds then drafted him in the 15th round of the 1978 MLB draft; he signed with the Reds, who sent him to their Pioneer League farm team, the Billings Mustangs in Montana. Redus (who was nearly 21 and thus a few years older than most of the other players in the league) hit for a .462 batting average with 17 home runs and 62 RBI in just 253 at-bats. Redus' average set an all-time American professional baseball record, which still stands.

After working his way through the Reds' minor league system and hitting .333 for the Triple-A Indianapolis Indians in 1982, Redus was recalled in September of that year, staying with Cincinnati through the 1985 season. Redus reached 5 home runs and 15 stolen bases at the start of his career the fastest of any MLB player. It took him 27 games to reach this mark (Barry Bonds did it in his first 30 games. Elly De La Cruz reached the mark in 40 games).

==== Philadelphia Phillies ====
He was traded along with Tom Hume from the Reds to the Phillies for John Denny and Jeff Gray on December 11, 1985.

==== Chicago White Sox ====
The Phillies traded him to the Chicago White Sox March 26, 1987 in exchange for Joe Cowley and cash. In 1987, that season, Redus finished third in stolen bases in the American League with 52.

==== Pittsburgh Pirates ====
Chicago traded Redus to the Pittsburgh Pirates in 1988 in exchange for Mike Diaz.

On August 25, 1989, Redus hit for the cycle for the Pirates in a 12–3 victory over the Reds.

Redus had his best offensive season in 1989, and helped the Pirates to three straight National League East division titles from 1990 to 1992, but his production was hampered by injuries and being platooned; after 1988, he never appeared in more than 98 games in any regular season. Redus led all batters with a .438 average (7-for-16) through the first six games of the 1992 National League Championship Series, having started four games at first base, and appearing as a pinch hitter once. Pirates manager Jim Leyland opted not to play Redus in the decisive seventh game, favoring left-handed batters against right-handed pitcher John Smoltz of the Atlanta Braves. In the seventh game, the Braves scored three times in the bottom of the ninth to erase a 2–0 Pirates lead and capture the National League pennant.

==== Texas Rangers ====
Redus opted for free agency at the end of 1992, playing two injury-plagued seasons with the Texas Rangers before retiring at the end of the 1994 campaign.

== Personal life ==
Redus and his wife have four children; daughters Lakesha, Manisha, and Nakosha, and a son, Gary II, who played basketball for the South Alabama Jaguars and is currently the head coach of the Rutgers women's basketball team In 2003, Redus was inducted to the sports hall of fame for Limestone County, Alabama. As of 2013, Redus lives in Decatur, Alabama. In 2017, Redus joined the coaching staff of the Montgomery Biscuits, a Double-A farm team for the Tampa Bay Rays. A 1989 news article noted that Redus had been fixing up a 1934 Chevrolet Coupe and a 1935 Ford Sedan over the prior winter. "It's my hobby," he remarked. "I love cars. I really love the old cars, rebuilding them and driving them."

== See also ==
- List of Major League Baseball players to hit for the cycle

Achievements
Preceded by Kevin McReynolds	Hitting for the cycle August 25, 1989	Succeeded by George Brett
