= 2020 United States House of Representatives elections in Alabama =

- November 3, 2020

All 7 Alabama seats to the United States House of Representatives
	Majority party	Minority party
Party	Republican	Democratic
Last election	6	1
Seats won	6	1
Seat change	Steady	Steady
Popular vote	1,416,012	608,809
Percentage	69.02%	29.67%
Swing	▲10.24%	▼11.22%

Republican
50–60%
60–70%
70–80%
80–90%
90>%
Democratic
50–60%
60–70%
70–80%
80–90%
90>%

The 2020 United States House of Representatives elections in Alabama were held on November 3, 2020, to elect the seven U.S. representatives from the state of Alabama, one from each of the state's seven congressional districts. The elections coincided with the 2020 U.S. presidential election, as well as other elections to the House of Representatives, elections to the United States Senate, and various state and local elections.

Alabama held a simultaneous election to the Senate, where incumbent Doug Jones lost reelection to Tommy Tuberville in a landslide.

== Overview ==
Popular vote
Republican	69.02%
Democratic	29.67%
Other	1.31%

House seats
Republican	85.72%
Democratic	14.28%

=== By district ===
Results of the 2020 United States House of Representatives elections in Alabama by district:

District	Republican		Democratic		Others (write-in)		Total		Result
District	Votes	%	Votes	%	Votes	%	Votes	%	Result
District 1	211,825	64.37%	116,949	35.54%	301	0.09%	329,075	100.0%	Republican hold
District 2	197,996	65.22%	105,286	34.68%	287	0.10%	303,569	100.0%	Republican hold
District 3	217,384	67.46%	104,595	32.46%	255	0.18%	322,234	100.0%	Republican hold
District 4	261,553	82.24%	56,237	17.68%	239	0.08%	318,029	100.0%	Republican hold
District 5	253,094	95.81%	0	0.00%	11,066	4.19%	264,160	100.0%	Republican hold
District 6	274,160	97.12%	0	0.00%	8,101	2.88%	282,261	100.0%	Republican hold
District 7	0	0.00%	225,742	97.16%	6,589	2.84%	232,331	100.0%	Democratic hold
Total	1,416,012	69.02%	608,809	29.67%	26,838	1.31%	2,051,659	100.0%	

== District 1 ==
2020 Alabama's 1st congressional district election
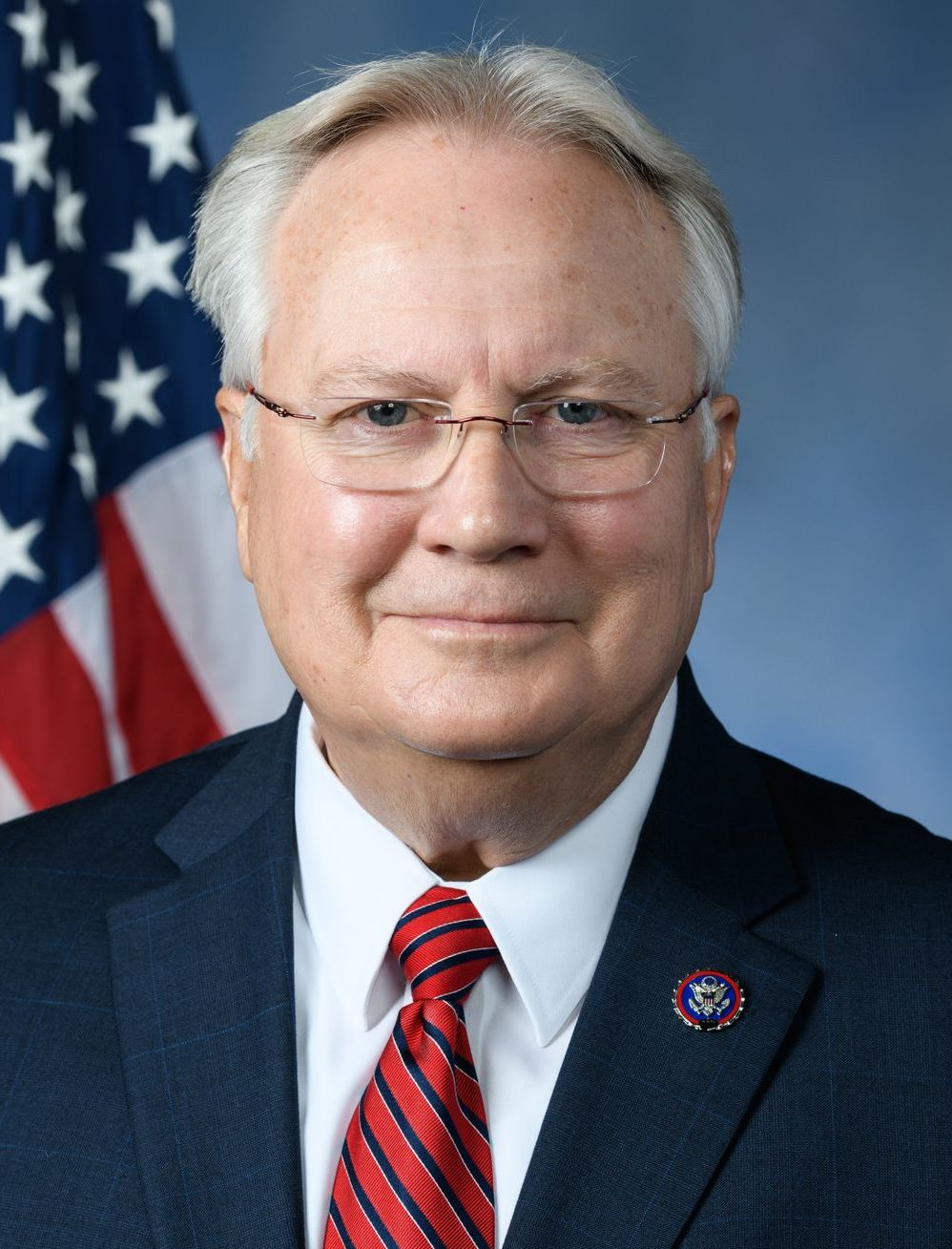

Nominee	Jerry Carl	James Averhart
Party	Republican	Democratic
Popular vote	211,825	116,949
Percentage	64.4%	35.5%
- Carl: 50–60% 60–70% 70–80% 80–90% >90% Averhart: 50–60% 60–70% 70–80% 80–90% >90% No votes
U.S. Representatives before election
Bradley Byrne
Republican
Elected U.S. Representatives
Jerry Carl
Republican

The 1st district is home to the city of Mobile, and includes Washington, Mobile, Baldwin, Escambia and Monroe counties. The incumbent was Republican Bradley Byrne, who was re-elected with 63.2% of the vote in 2018, and announced on February 20, 2019, that he would seek the Republican nomination for U.S. Senate in 2020.

=== Republican primary ===
==== Candidates ====
===== Declared =====
- Jerry Carl, Mobile County commissioner
- John Castorani, U.S. Army veteran
- Bill Hightower, former state senator and candidate for Governor of Alabama in 2018
- Wes Lambert, businessman
- Chris Pringle, state representative

===== Declined =====
- Bradley Byrne, incumbent U.S. representative (running for U.S. Senate)
- Rusty Glover, former state senator
- Terry Lathan, chair of the Alabama Republican Party

==== Endorsements ====
Jerry Carl

Federal officials

- Bradley Byrne, U.S. representative (AL-01) and Republican candidate in the 2020 U.S. Senate election in Alabama

State officials

- Chris Pringle, state representative and 2020 Republican candidate in AL-01

Organizations

- U.S. Chamber of Commerce
Bill Hightower

Federal officials

- Gary Bauer, former U.S. Under Secretary of Education (1985–1987) and U.S. Deputy Under Secretary of Education (1982–1985)
- Ted Cruz, U.S. senator from Texas and 2016 Republican presidential candidate
- Rick Santorum, 2012 and 2016 Republican presidential candidate and former U.S. Senator from Pennsylvania (1995–2007) and U.S. Representative (PA-18) (1991–1995)

State officials

- Bill Roberts, former state representative (2010–2014)

Organizations

- Club for Growth PAC
- Eagle Forum PAC
- National Right to Life Committee

Individuals

- Stephen Moore, economic adviser to the Donald Trump 2016 presidential campaign and co-founder and former president of the Club for Growth (1999–2004)

==== Polling ====
Poll source	Date(s) administered	Sample size (Note: Key: A – all adults RV – registered voters LV – likely voters V – unclear)	Margin of error	John Castorani	Jerry Carl	Bill Hightower	Wes Lambert	Chris Pringle	Undecided
WPA Intelligence (Note: Poll sponsored by Club for Growth, which endorsed Hightower prior to the poll's sampling period)	November 19–21, 2019	413 (LV)	± 4.9%	1%	13%	35%	2%	16%	33%
Public Opinion Strategies (Note: Poll sponsored by Jerry Carl's campaign)	November 18–19, 2019	300 (V)	± 5.66%	0%	20%	29%	2%	14%	–
Public Opinion Strategies	August, 2019	– (V) (Note: Not yet released)	–	–	13%	27%	2%	14%	–
WPA Intelligence	July 23–24, 2019	400 (LV)	± 4.9%	–	12%	34%	2%	16%	35%

==== Primary results ====
2020 Alabama's 1st congressional district Republican primary initial round results by county Map legend: Carl—40–50%; Carl—30–40%; Hightower—40–50%

Republican primary results
Party	Candidate	Votes	%
Republican	Jerry Carl	38,359	38.7
Republican	Bill Hightower	37,133	37.5
Republican	Chris Pringle	19,053	19.2
Republican	Wes Lambert	3,084	3.1
Republican	John Castorani	1,465	1.5
Total votes		99,094	100.0

==== Runoff results ====
Republican primary runoff results
Party	Candidate	Votes	%
Republican	Jerry Carl	44,421	52.3
Republican	Bill Hightower	40,552	47.7
Total votes		84,973	100.0

=== Democratic primary ===
==== Candidates ====
===== Declared =====
- James Averhart, U.S. marines veteran
- Rick Collins, real estate agent
- Kiani Gardner, college professor and biologist

==== Primary results ====
2020 Alabama's 1st congressional district Democratic primary initial round results by county Map legend: Gardner—70–80%; Gardner—40–50%; Averhart—40–50%; Averhart—50–60%

Democratic primary results
Party	Candidate	Votes	%
Democratic	Kiani A. Gardner	22,962	44.1
Democratic	James Averhart	21,022	40.3
Democratic	Rick Collins	8,119	15.6
Total votes		52,103	100.0

==== Runoff results ====
Democratic primary runoff results
Party	Candidate	Votes	%
Democratic	James Averhart	15,840	56.7
Democratic	Kiani Gardner	12,102	43.3
Total votes		27,942	100.0

=== General election ===
==== Predictions ====
Source	Ranking	As of
The Cook Political Report	Safe R	November 2, 2020
Inside Elections	Safe R	October 28, 2020
Sabato's Crystal Ball	Safe R	November 2, 2020
Politico	Safe R	November 2, 2020
Daily Kos	Safe R	November 2, 2020
RCP	Safe R	November 2, 2020

==== Results ====
Alabama's 1st congressional district, 2020
Party	Candidate	Votes	%
Republican	Jerry Carl	211,825	64.4
Democratic	James Averhart	116,949	35.5
Write-in		301	0.1
Total votes		329,075	100.0
Republican hold			

== District 2 ==
2020 Alabama's 2nd congressional district election
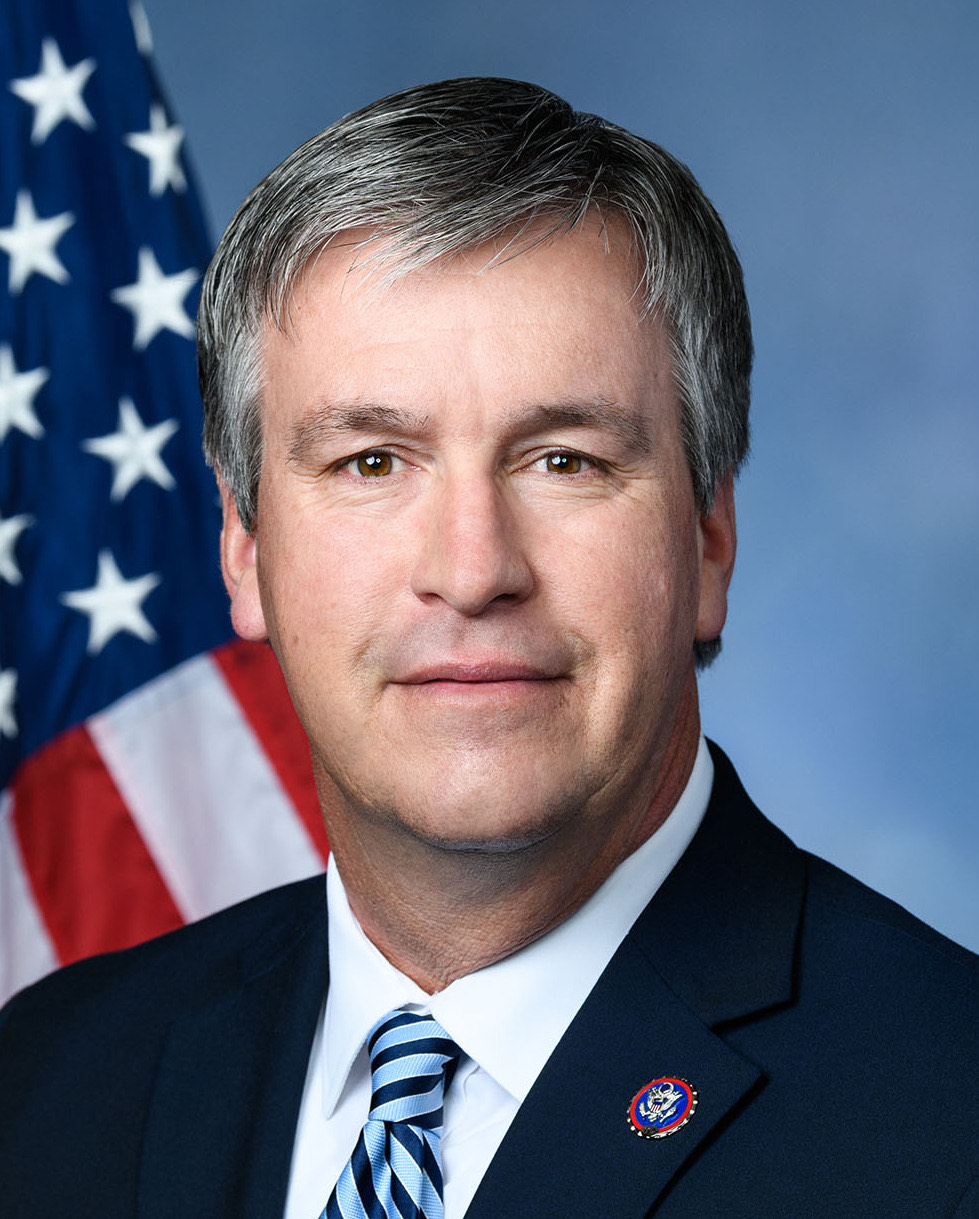

Nominee	Barry Moore	Phyllis Harvey-Hall
Party	Republican	Democratic
Popular vote	197,996	105,286
Percentage	65.2%	34.7%
- Moore: 50–60% 60–70% 70–80% 80–90% >90% Harvey-Hall: 50–60% 60–70% 70–80% 80–90% >90%
U.S. Representatives before election
Martha Roby
Republican
Elected U.S. Representatives
Barry Moore
Republican

The 2nd district encompasses most of the Montgomery metropolitan area, and stretches into the Wiregrass Region in the southeastern portion of the state, including Andalusia, Dothan, Greenville, and Troy. The incumbent was Republican Martha Roby, who was re-elected with 61.4% of the vote in 2018; on July 26, 2019, she announced she would not seek re-election.

=== Republican primary ===
==== Candidates ====
===== Declared =====
- Thomas W. Brown Jr., statistician
- Jeff Coleman, businessman
- Terri Hasdorff, consulting firm president
- Troy King, former Alabama Attorney General
- Barry Moore, former state representative
- Bob Rogers, electrician
- Jessica Taylor, businesswoman and attorney

===== Withdrawn =====
- Will Dismukes, state representative

===== Declined =====
- Wes Allen, state representative
- Clyde Chambliss, state senator
- Donnie Chesteen, state senator
- Martha Roby, incumbent U.S. representative

===== Endorsements =====
Jeff Coleman

Federal officials

- Martha Roby, U.S. representative (AL-02)

Organizations

- U.S. Chamber of Commerce
Barry Moore

Federal officials

- Andy Biggs, U.S. representative (AZ-05)
- Jim Jordan, U.S. representative (OH-04)

State officials

- Nathaniel Ledbetter, state representative and state House majority leader
- Tim Wadsworth, state representative

Organizations

- Club for Growth PAC
- Eagle Forum PAC
- House Freedom Fund
Jessica Taylor (eliminated)

State officials

- Will Dismukes, state representative and 2020 Republican candidate in AL-02

Organizations

- Maggie's List
- Susan B. Anthony List

==== Polling ====
Poll source	Date(s) administered	Sample size	Margin of error	Troy King	Barry Moore	Will Dismukes	Jeff Coleman	Jessica Taylor	Other	Undecided
We Ask America	January 14–15, 2020	600 (LV)	± 4.0%	16%	8%	–	43%	5%	1%	25%
Tarrance Group (Note: Poll sponsored by King's campaign)	September 26–29, 2019	303 (V)	± 5.8%	34%	18%	17%	5%	2%	2%	23%

==== Primary results ====
2020 Alabama's 2nd congressional district Republican primary initial round results by county Map legend: Coleman—50–60%; Coleman—40–50%; Coleman—30–40%; Coleman—<30%; Taylor—30–40%; King—40–50%

Republican primary results
Party	Candidate	Votes	%
Republican	Jeff Coleman	39,738	38.1
Republican	Barry Moore	21,354	20.4
Republican	Jessica Taylor	20,763	19.9
Republican	Troy King	15,145	14.5
Republican	Terri Hasdorff	5,207	5.0
Republican	Thomas W. Brown	1,395	1.3
Republican	Bob Rogers	824	0.8
Total votes		104,426	100.0

==== Runoff results ====
Republican primary runoff results
Party	Candidate	Votes	%
Republican	Barry Moore	52,248	60.4
Republican	Jeff Coleman	34,185	39.6
Total votes		86,433	100.0

=== Democratic primary ===
==== Candidates ====
===== Declared =====
- Phyllis Harvey-Hall, education consultant and retired teacher
- Nathan Mathis, former state representative and nominee for Alabama's 2nd congressional district in 2016

==== Primary results ====
2020 Alabama's 2nd congressional district Democratic primary results by county Map legend: Harvey-Hall—70–80%; Harvey-Hall—60–70%; Harvey-Hall—50–60%; Mathis—70–80%; Mathis—60–70%

Democratic primary results
Party	Candidate	Votes	%
Democratic	Phyllis Harvey-Hall	27,399	59.2
Democratic	Nathan Mathis	18,898	40.8
Total votes		46,297	100.0

=== General election ===
==== Predictions ====
Source	Ranking	As of
The Cook Political Report	Safe R	November 2, 2020
Inside Elections	Safe R	October 28, 2020
Sabato's Crystal Ball	Safe R	November 2, 2020
Politico	Safe R	November 2, 2020
Daily Kos	Safe R	November 2, 2020
RCP	Safe R	November 2, 2020

==== Results ====
Alabama's 2nd congressional district, 2020
Party	Candidate	Votes	%
Republican	Barry Moore	197,996	65.2
Democratic	Phyllis Harvey-Hall	105,286	34.7
Write-in		287	0.1
Total votes		303,569	100.0
Republican hold			

== District 3 ==
2020 Alabama's 3rd congressional district election
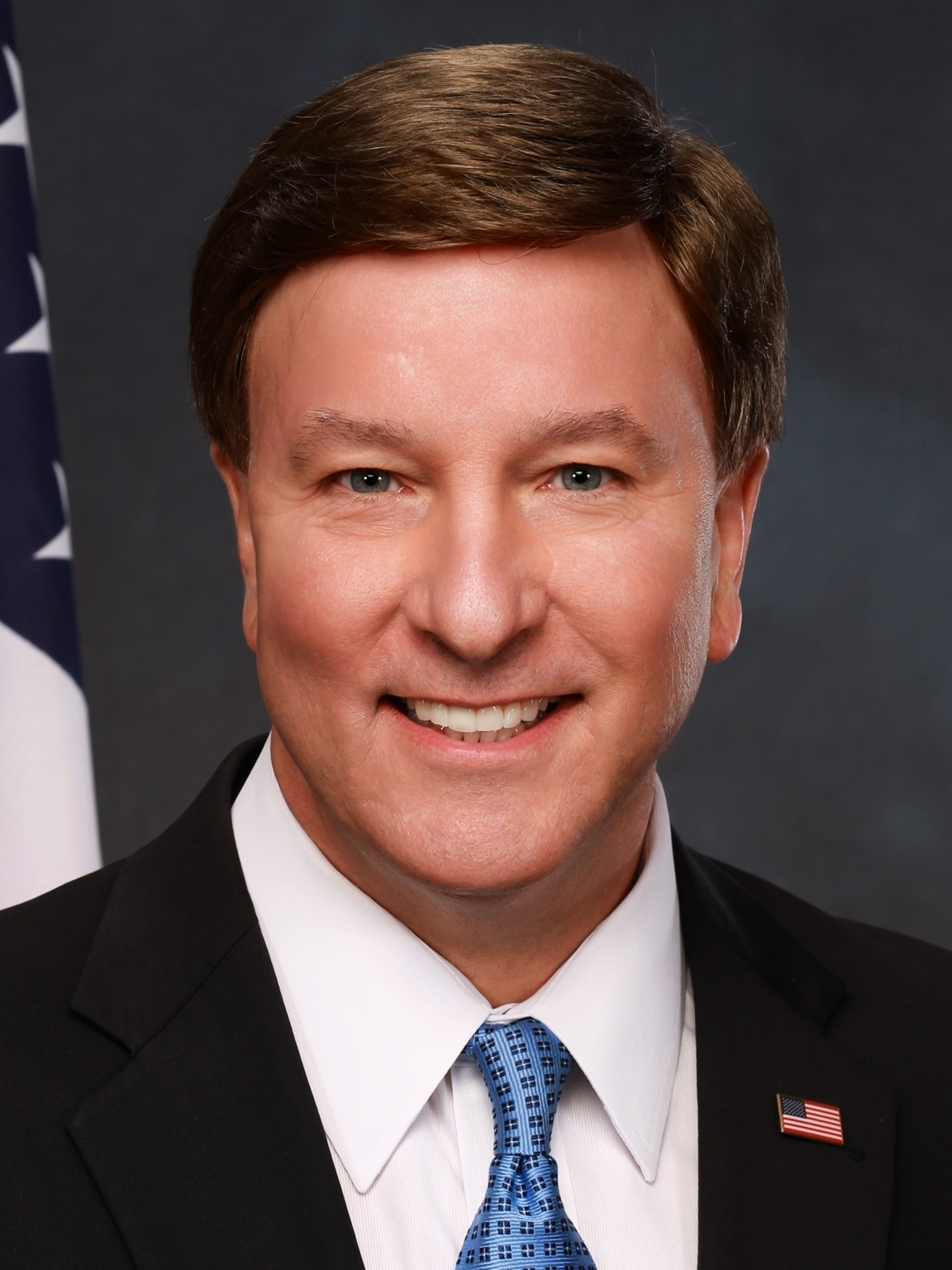

Nominee	Mike Rogers	Adia Winfrey
Party	Republican	Democratic
Popular vote	217,384	104,595
Percentage	67.5%	32.5%
- Rogers: 50–60% 60–70% 70–80% 80–90% >90% Winfrey: 50–60% 60–70% 70–80% 80–90% >90% No votes
U.S. Representatives before election
Mike Rogers
Republican
Elected U.S. Representatives
Mike Rogers
Republican

The 3rd district is based in eastern Alabama, taking in small parts of Montgomery, as well as, Talladega, Tuskegee and Auburn. The incumbent was Republican Mike Rogers, who was re-elected with 63.7% of the vote in 2018.

=== Republican primary ===
==== Candidates ====
===== Declared =====
- Mike Rogers, incumbent U.S. representative

=== Democratic primary ===
==== Candidates ====
===== Declared =====
- Adia Winfrey, clinical psychologist and candidate for Alabama's 3rd congressional district in 2018

=== General election ===
==== Predictions ====
Source	Ranking	As of
The Cook Political Report	Safe R	November 2, 2020
Inside Elections	Safe R	October 28, 2020
Sabato's Crystal Ball	Safe R	November 2, 2020
Politico	Safe R	November 2, 2020
Daily Kos	Safe R	November 2, 2020
RCP	Safe R	November 2, 2020

==== Results ====
Alabama's 3rd congressional district, 2020
Party	Candidate	Votes	%
Republican	Mike Rogers (incumbent)	217,384	67.5
Democratic	Adia Winfrey	104,595	32.5
Write-in		255	0.1
Total votes		322,234	100.0
Republican hold			

== District 4 ==
2020 Alabama's 4th congressional district election
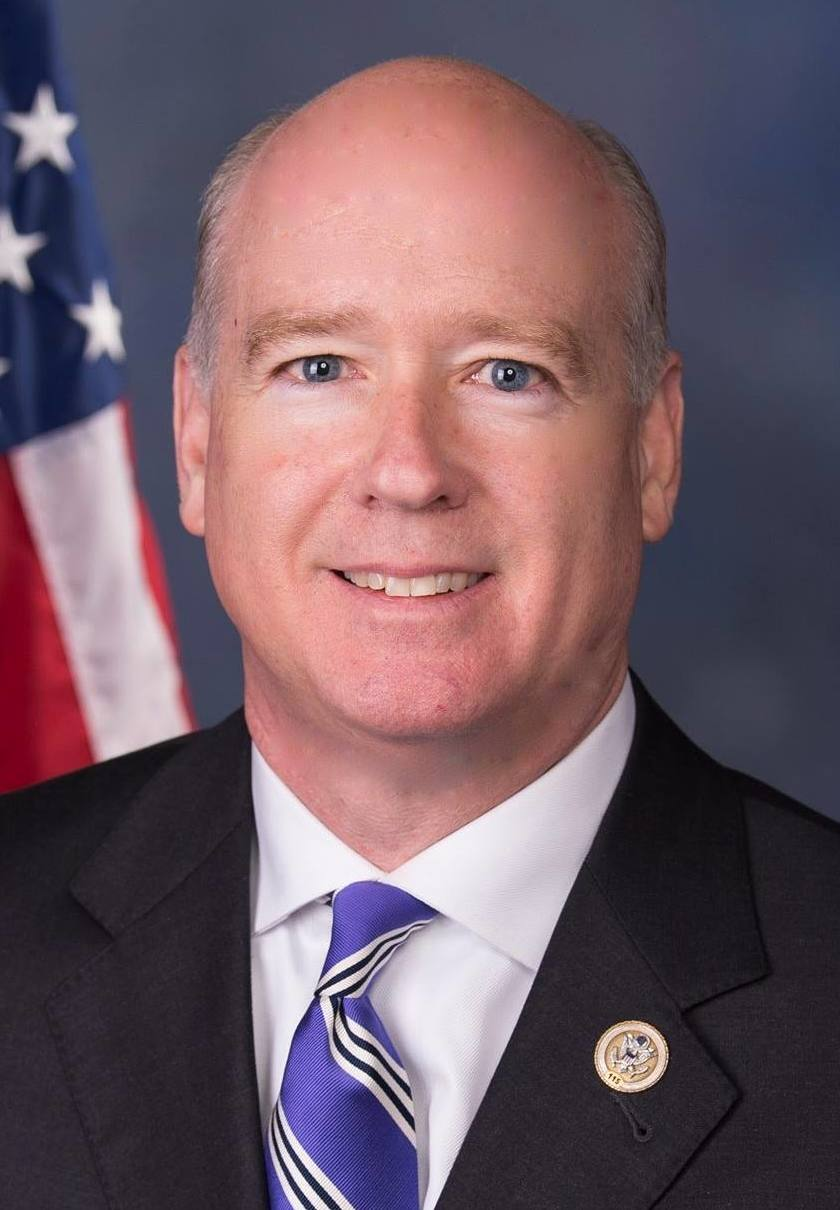

Nominee	Robert Aderholt	Rick Neighbors
Party	Republican	Democratic
Popular vote	261,553	56,237
Percentage	82.2%	17.7%
- Aderholt: 50–60% 60–70% 70–80% 80–90% >90% Neighbors: 50–60% 60–70% 70–80% 80–90% >90% No votes
U.S. Representatives before election
Robert Aderholt
Republican
Elected U.S. Representatives
Robert Aderholt
Republican

The 4th district is located in rural north-central Alabama, spanning the Evangelical belt area. The incumbent was Republican Robert Aderholt, who was re-elected with 79.8% of the vote in 2018.

=== Republican primary ===
==== Candidates ====
===== Declared =====
- Robert Aderholt, incumbent U.S. representative

==== Endorsements ====
Robert Aderholt

Organizations

- United States Chamber of Commerce

=== Democratic primary ===
==== Candidates ====
===== Declared =====
- Rick Neighbors

=== General election ===
==== Predictions ====
Source	Ranking	As of
The Cook Political Report	Safe R	November 2, 2020
Inside Elections	Safe R	October 28, 2020
Sabato's Crystal Ball	Safe R	November 2, 2020
Politico	Safe R	November 2, 2020
Daily Kos	Safe R	November 2, 2020
RCP	Safe R	November 2, 2020

==== Results ====
Alabama's 4th congressional district, 2020
Party	Candidate	Votes	%
Republican	Robert Aderholt (incumbent)	261,553	82.2
Democratic	Rick Neighbors	56,237	17.7
Write-in		239	0.1
Total votes		318,029	100.0
Republican hold			

== District 5 ==
2020 Alabama's 5th congressional district election
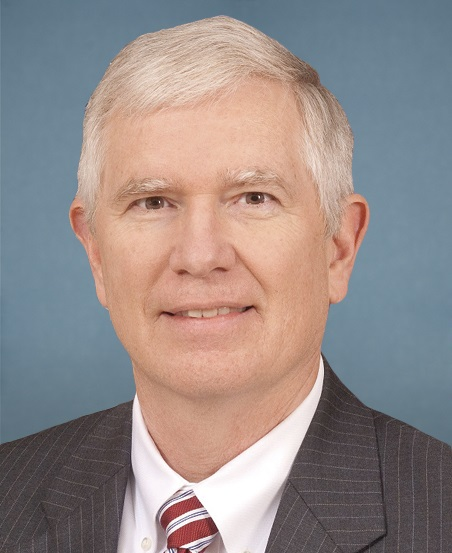
Nominee	Mo Brooks
Party	Republican
Popular vote	253,094
Percentage	95.8%
- Brooks: 70–80% 80–90% >90%
U.S. Representatives before election
Mo Brooks
Republican
Elected U.S. Representatives
Mo Brooks
Republican

The 5th district is based in northern Alabama, including the city of Huntsville. The incumbent was Republican Mo Brooks, who was re-elected with 61.0% of the vote in 2018.

=== Republican primary ===
==== Candidates ====
===== Declared =====
- Mo Brooks, incumbent U.S. representative
- Chris Lewis, U.S. Navy veteran

=== Results ===
2020 Alabama's 5th congressional district Republican primary results by county Map legend: Brooks—70–80%; Brooks—70–80%

Republican primary results
Party	Candidate	Votes	%
Republican	Mo Brooks (incumbent)	83,740	74.9
Republican	Chris Lewis	28,113	25.1
Total votes		111,853	100.0

=== General election ===
==== Predictions ====
Source	Ranking	As of
The Cook Political Report	Safe R	November 2, 2020
Inside Elections	Safe R	October 28, 2020
Sabato's Crystal Ball	Safe R	November 2, 2020
Politico	Safe R	November 2, 2020
Daily Kos	Safe R	November 2, 2020
RCP	Safe R	November 2, 2020

==== Results ====
Alabama's 5th congressional district, 2020
Party	Candidate	Votes	%
Republican	Mo Brooks (incumbent)	253,094	95.8
Write-in		11,066	4.2
Total votes		264,160	100.0
Republican hold			

== District 6 ==
2020 Alabama's 6th congressional district election
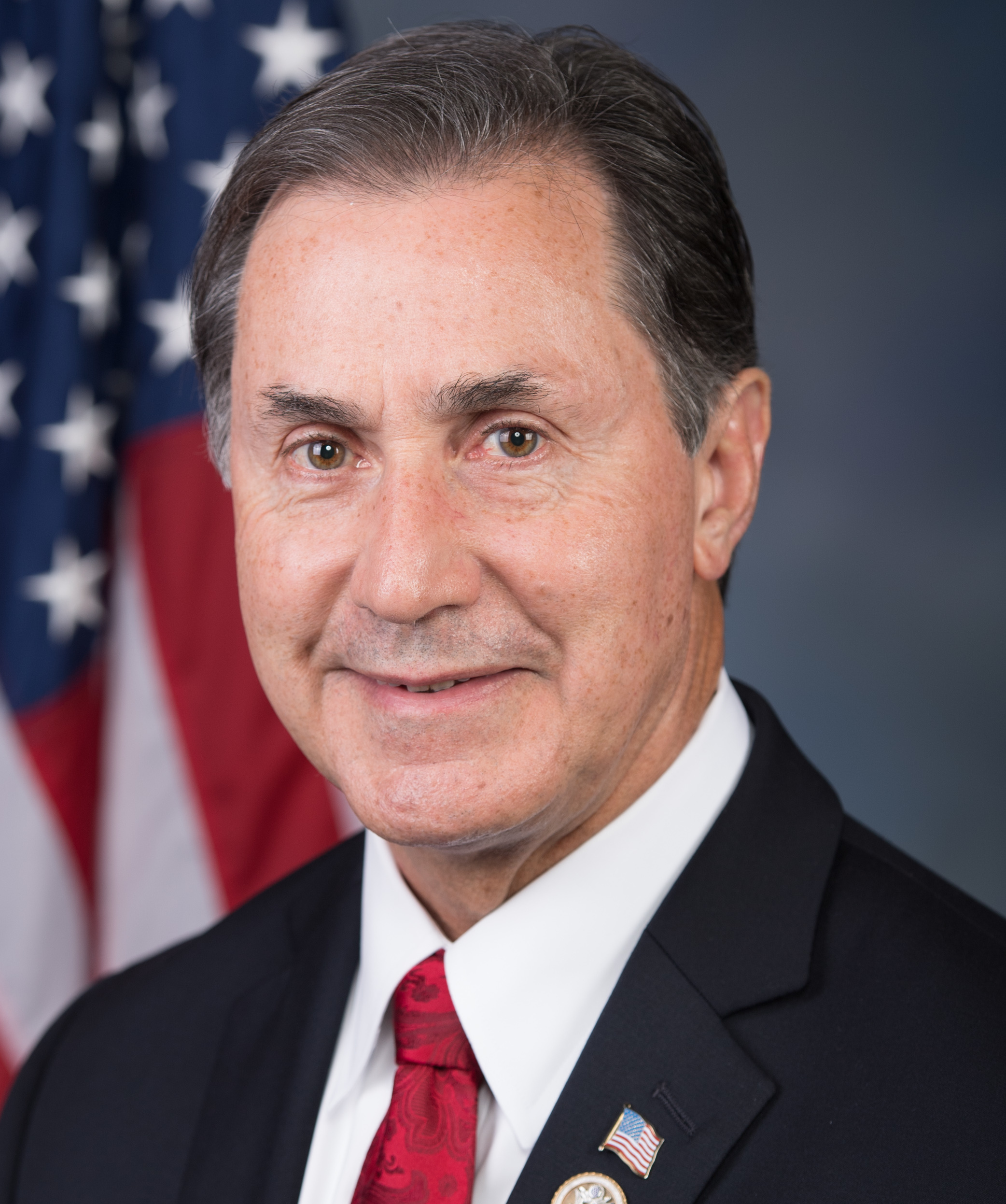
Nominee	Gary Palmer
Party	Republican
Popular vote	274,160
Percentage	97.1%
- Palmer: 60–70% 80–90% >90% No votes
U.S. Representatives before election
Gary Palmer
Republican
Elected U.S. Representatives
Gary Palmer
Republican

The 6th district encompasses Greater Birmingham, taking in parts of Birmingham, as well as the surrounding suburbs, including Bibb, Blount, Chilton, Coosa, and Shelby counties. The incumbent was Republican Gary Palmer, who was re-elected with 69.2% of the vote in 2018.

=== Republican primary ===
==== Candidates ====
===== Declared =====
- Gary Palmer, incumbent U.S. representative

=== General election ===
==== Predictions ====
Source	Ranking	As of
The Cook Political Report	Safe R	November 2, 2020
Inside Elections	Safe R	October 28, 2020
Sabato's Crystal Ball	Safe R	November 2, 2020
Politico	Safe R	November 2, 2020
Daily Kos	Safe R	November 2, 2020
RCP	Safe R	November 2, 2020

==== Results ====
Alabama's 6th congressional district, 2020
Party	Candidate	Votes	%
Republican	Gary Palmer (incumbent)	274,160	97.1
Write-in		8,101	2.9
Total votes		282,261	100.0
Republican hold			

== District 7 ==
2020 Alabama's 7th congressional district election
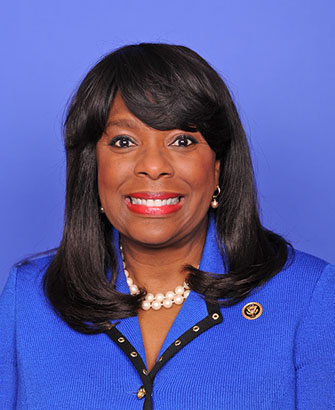
Nominee	Terri Sewell
Party	Democratic
Popular vote	225,742
Percentage	97.2%
- Sewell: 50–60% 60–70% 70–80% 80–90% >90% Write-in: 50–60% 60–70% Tie: 50% No votes
U.S. Representatives before election
Terri Sewell
Democratic
Elected U.S. Representatives
Terri Sewell
Democratic

The 7th district encompasses the Black Belt, including Selma and Demopolis, as well as taking in majority-black areas of Birmingham, Tuscaloosa, and Montgomery. The incumbent was Democrat Terri Sewell, who was re-elected with 97.8% of the vote in 2018, without major-party opposition.

=== Democratic primary ===
==== Candidates ====
===== Declared =====
- Terri Sewell, incumbent U.S. representative

=== General election ===
==== Predictions ====
Source	Ranking	As of
The Cook Political Report	Safe D	November 2, 2020
Inside Elections	Safe D	October 28, 2020
Sabato's Crystal Ball	Safe D	November 2, 2020
Politico	Safe D	November 2, 2020
Daily Kos	Safe D	November 2, 2020
RCP	Safe D	November 2, 2020

==== Results ====
Alabama's 7th congressional district, 2020
Party	Candidate	Votes	%
Democratic	Terri Sewell (incumbent)	225,742	97.2
Write-in		6,589	2.8
Total votes		232,331	100.0
Democratic hold			

== Notes ==
Partisan clients
