= Alabama's 4th House of Representatives district =

American legislative district

Alabama's 4th State House of Representatives district
Representative
Parker Moore; R–Decatur
- Demographics: 82.5% White; 9.6% Black; 1.3% Asian; 0.8% Native American; 0.1% Hawaiian/Pacific Islander; 0.1% Other
- Population (2010) • Voting age • Citizens of voting age: 51,181; 18; 76.2%

Alabama's 4th House of Representatives district is one of 105 districts in the Alabama House of Representatives. Its current representative is Parker Moore. It was created in 1967 and encompasses parts of Limestone and Morgan counties. As of the 2010 census, the district has a population of 51,181, with 76.2% being of legal voting age.

== List of representatives ==
Representative	Party	Term start	Term end	Electoral history	Represented counties	Ref.
District created		January 3, 1967				
Bill Williams	Democratic	January 3, 1967	January 3, 1971	Elected in 1966		
Data unavailable		January 3, 1971	January 3, 1975	Elected in 1970		
J.W. Goodwin	Democratic	January 3, 1975	January 3, 1984	Elected in 1974 Re-elected in 1978 Re-elected in 1982		
Denzel L. Clark	Democratic	January 3, 1984	January 3, 1987	Elected in 1983		
James Hamilton	Democratic	January 3, 1987	January 3, 1995	Elected in 1986 Re-elected in 1990		
Nelson Papucci	Republican	January 3, 1995	January 3, 1999	Elected in 1994		
Angelo Mancuso	Democratic	January 3, 1999	January 3, 2003	Elected in 1998		
Micky Hammon	Republican	January 3, 2003	September 25, 2017	Elected in 2002 Re-elected in 2006 Re-elected in 2010		
Micky Hammon	Republican	January 3, 2003	September 25, 2017	Re-elected in 2014	Limestone, Morgan	
Vacant		September 25, 2017	May 16, 2018		Limestone, Morgan	
Parker Moore	Republican	May 16, 2018	Incumbent	Elected in 2018 Re-elected in 2018	Limestone, Morgan	
