= Autauga Academy =

Location
- 497 Golson Road; Prattville, Alabama 36067; United States; 32.4716102°N 86.5454269°W

Information
- Type: Private
- Founded: 1969 (57 years ago)
- CEEB code: 012218
- NCES School ID: 00002722
- Faculty: 21.3
- Grades: PK-12
- Enrollment: 306 (2016)
- Colors: Grey & Gold
- Mascot: General
- Nickname: Generals
- Website: www.autaugaacademy.com

Autauga Academy is a private coed PK-12 school in Prattville, Alabama, the seat of Autauga County.

== History ==
Autauga Private Academy was founded in 1969 as a segregation academy. It is distinct from a seminary of the same name founded in 1888.

Autauga attracted the attention of the United States Commission on Civil Rights, prompting an inspection tour in 1982, along with eight other schools in Alabama

In 2011 a black student, future National Football League tight end O. J. Howard — then a student at the school — was told by the headmaster of the school he could not bring a girl to the prom because she was white.

== Notable alumni ==
- Will Dismukes, Republican state politician
- O. J. Howard, NFL player
