= Micky Hammon =

American politician

Majority Leader of the Alabama House of Representatives
- In office January 12, 2011 – February 22, 2017
- Preceded by: Ken Guin
- Succeeded by: Nathaniel Ledbetter

Member of the Alabama House of Representatives from the 4th district
- In office January 3, 2003 – September 11, 2017
- Preceded by: Angelo Mancuso
- Succeeded by: Parker Moore

Personal details
- Born: August 25, 1957 Decatur, Alabama
- Died: March 8, 2026 (aged 68) Decatur, Alabama
- Party: Republican
- Spouse: Pam Hammon
- Children: 3
- Education: Calhoun Community College

Micky Hammon (August 25, 1957 – March 8, 2026) was an American politician serving in the Republican Party who became the Majority Leader of the Alabama House of Representatives, representing the 4th district, Limestone and Morgan counties. Hammon resigned as House Majority Leader in February 2017 and announced in July 2017 that he would be retiring and would not see reelection in 2018.

In September 2017, Hammon pleaded guilty to devising a scheme to commit mail fraud after he used campaign funds for personal use (a felony). The scheme took place in 2013 and 2014. He was convicted in 2018 and sentenced to three months in prison.

== Early life ==
He received an electrical degree from Calhoun Community College.

== Career ==
He works as an electrical contractor. He is a member of Associated Builders and Contractors, Business Council of Alabama, the Decatur Chamber of Commerce, the Morgan County Economic Development Association, the National Federation of Independent Business, the Tennessee Valley Training Center, and the United States Chamber of Commerce.

== Politics ==
He was first elected to the Alabama House of Representatives in 2002. After Republicans took control of the House following the 2010 elections, Hammon was elected majority leader. He remained in that position until February 2017.

He was a member of the Economic Development and Tourism Committee (Vice Chair), Public Safety and Homeland Security Committee (chair), Subcommittee on Economic Development and Incentives (chair), and Subcommittee on Homeland Security and Immigration (chair).

He was endorsed by The Alabama Tea Party Express. In 2011, he co-authored an anti-immigration bill; one critic said it was "the most hateful, mean-spirited anti-immigration bill in the country".

== Conviction and sentencing ==
Hammon was accused of taking money from his campaign account and using it for personal expenses. He pled guilty to a felony count of mail fraud which required him to resign from his position in the House. He was sentenced to three months in prison.

== Personal life ==
He is married to Pam Hammon, and they have three children.

He died on March 8, 2026, in Decatur, Alabama at age 68.
