= Parker Moore =

American politician

Member of the Alabama House of Representatives from the 4th district
- Incumbent
- Assumed office May 16, 2018
- Preceded by: Micky Hammon

Personal details
- Born: Parker Duncan Moore; March 8, 1989 (age 37) Decatur, Alabama, U.S.
- Party: Republican
- Education: University of Alabama

Parker Duncan Moore (born March 8, 1989) is an American politician who has served in the Alabama House of Representatives from the 4th district since 2018. He is a member of the Republican Party.

== Early life and education ==
He was born in Decatur, Alabama on March 8, 1989. He received a degree in political science from the University of Alabama.

== Political career ==
He won the 2017-2018 Alabama State House Special Election on May 15, 2018, and was sworn in on May 16, 2018.

== Political positions ==
Moore is a supporter of gun rights. He has consistently voted in favor of policies favoring gun rights and the Second Amendment.

Moore supports measures that "ensure only American Citizens vote", and he has consisted supported and voted for legislation that has supported such measures.
