= Will Dismukes =

American politician

Member of the Alabama House of Representatives from the 88th district
- In office November 7, 2018 – 2022
- Preceded by: Paul Beckman
- Succeeded by: Jerry Starnes

Personal details
- Born: February 12, 1990 (age 36) Prattville, Alabama
- Party: Republican
- Education: Faulkner University

William Dismukes (born February 12, 1990) is an American politician from the state of Alabama. A Republican, he served in the Alabama House of Representatives, representing the 88th district from 2018 to 2022. In 2023, Dismukes was convicted of theft.

== Early life ==
Dismukes was born and raised in Prattville, Alabama. He has three sisters. His family moved to a farm near Millbrook, Alabama, when he was ten years old. Dismukes served as a page in the Alabama House of Representatives when he was 16 years old.

Dismukes graduated from Autauga Academy, and enrolled at Enterprise State Community College. He also attended The University of Arkansas at Monticello before he transferred to the University of Montevallo in 2010. He also attended Faulkner University and played college baseball for the Faulkner Eagles. He was considered a prospect to play professional baseball, but suffered a massive stroke at the age of 22, during his senior year, which ended his chances of being selected in the Major League Baseball draft. After graduating from Faulkner in 2013, Dismukes pitched for DOOR Neptunus of Honkbal Hoofdklasse in 2014.

Dismukes interned for Micky Hammon, the majority leader of the Alabama House, before graduating from college.

== Political career ==
Dismukes ran as a Republican for the Alabama House in the 2018 elections to succeed Republican Paul Beckman, who did not run for re-election, as the representative for the 88th district. Dismukes was elected, and took office in 2019 at 28 years old, making him the youngest member of the state legislature at the time.

Following Martha Roby's decision to not run for re-election to the United States House of Representatives, Dismukes announced in August 2019 that he would run to succeed her as the representative for Alabama's 2nd congressional district in the 2020 elections. In October 2019, Dismukes ended his congressional campaign, citing the lack of fundraising and splitting his efforts between the campaign and his duties in the Alabama House.

On June 19, 2020, the Alabama Democratic Party called for Dismukes to resign from the legislature, citing his role as Chaplain of the Prattville Dragoons chapter of the Sons of Confederate Veterans organization, as well as social media posts showing him celebrating the Confederate States of America. On July 27, Dismukes spoke at an event memorializing and commemorating Nathan Bedford Forrest, the first leader of the Ku Klux Klan and a Confederate General. His appearance attracted attention from national media outlets, in part because it coincided with ceremonies honoring recently deceased civil rights leader and U.S. Congressman John Lewis. In both instances, Dismukes refused calls for his resignation.

On August 6, 2020, an arrest warrant was issued for Dismukes in Montgomery County. District Attorney Daryl Bailey said his office received a complaint on May 20 "regarding an alleged theft of a large sum of money from an employee" at a business. The amount exceeded $2,500, per the statute, but "the alleged amount was a lot more than that", added Bailey. He was indicted on charges of theft in June 2021, and pleaded not guilty. A jury convicted him of theft on April 14, 2023. He was sentenced to five years of community corrections and two years of probation.

Dismukes lost his bid for reelection on May 24, 2022, receiving 38% of the vote.

== Personal life ==
Dismukes and his ex-wife, Amber, have a son and daughter. He also has a daughter with his wife Carol Dismukes. In addition to his political career, Dismukes operates a floor-covering business.

Dismukes became an ordained minister of the Southern Baptist denomination in 2013, and was serving as a youth minister during his first campaign for office. He was elected as pastor of his Southern Baptist church in 2019. He co-hosted a celebration of the life of KKK founder Nathan Bedford Forrest, and resigned as pastor in July 2020, amid the national and local criticism for his appearance at the Forrest event, following a meeting with local Baptist leaders.
