= Paul Lee (politician) =

American politician

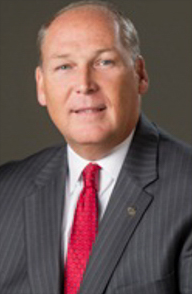

Majority Leader of the Alabama House of Representatives
- Incumbent
- Assumed office February 18, 2026
- Preceded by: Scott Stadthagen

Member of the Alabama House of Representatives from the 86th district
- Incumbent
- Assumed office November 3, 2010
- Preceded by: Benjamin Lewis

Personal details
- Born: Paul Wesley Lee; October 7, 1960 (age 65) Dothan, Alabama, U.S.
- Party: Republican
- Education: Wallace Community College (attended)

Paul Wesley Lee (born October 7, 1960) is an American politician who is a member of the Alabama House of Representatives, representing the 86th district since 2010.

In February 2026, Lee was elected and took office as the majority leader of the Alabama House of Representatives, after being selected by the Republican caucus to succeed Scott Stadthagen. As of 2026, Lee is the chair of the Alabama House Health Committee.

Alabama House of Representatives
Preceded by Scott Stadthagen	Majority Leader of the Alabama House of Representatives; 2026–present	Incumbent
