= Paul Beckman =

American politician

Member of the Alabama House of Representatives from the 88th district
- In office November 3, 2010 – November 7, 2018
- Preceded by: H. Mac Gipson Jr.
- Succeeded by: Will Dismukes

Personal details
- Born: May 27, 1952 (age 74) Fort Lewis, Washington
- Party: Republican

Paul Beckman (born May 27, 1952) is an American politician who served in the Alabama House of Representatives from the 88th district from 2010 to 2018.
