= O. J. Howard =

American football player (born 1994)

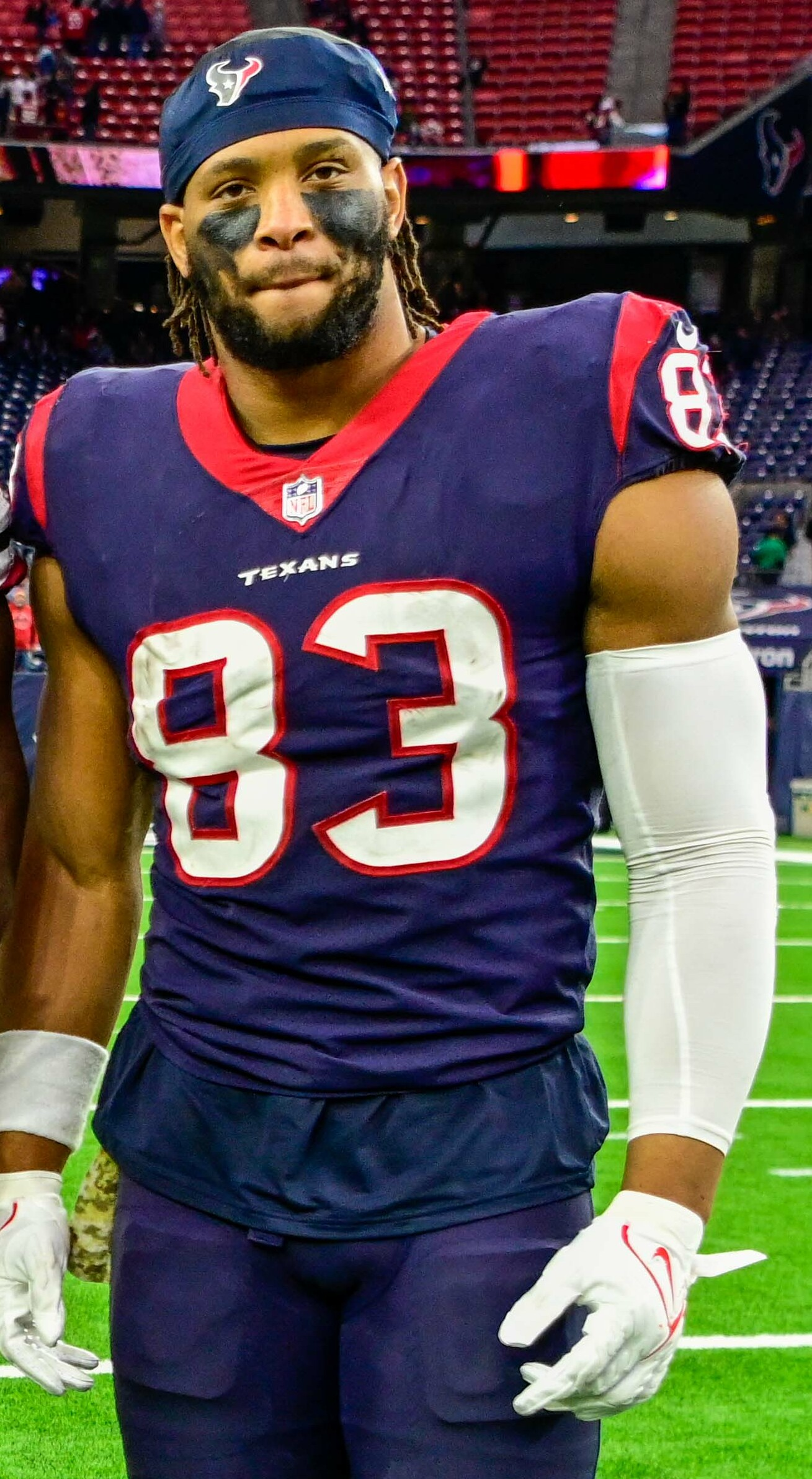
- Howard with the Houston Texans in 2022

No. 80, 8, 83
- Position: Tight end

Personal information
- Born: November 18, 1994 (age 31); Prattville, Alabama, U.S.
- Listed height: 6 ft 6 in (1.98 m)
- Listed weight: 251 lb (114 kg)

Career information
- High school: Autauga Academy (Prattville)
- College: Alabama (2013–2016)
- NFL draft: 2017: 1st round, 19th overall pick

Career history
- Tampa Bay Buccaneers (2017–2021); Buffalo Bills (2022)*; Houston Texans (2022); Las Vegas Raiders (2023)*
- * Offseason or practice squad member only

Awards and highlights
- Super Bowl champion (LV); CFP national champion (2015); CFP National Championship Game Offensive MVP (2016); Second-team All-SEC (2016)

Career NFL statistics
- Receptions: 129
- Receiving yards: 1,882
- Receiving touchdowns: 17
- Stats at Pro Football Reference

Oterrius Jabari Howard (born November 18, 1994) is an American former professional football player who was a tight end in the National Football League (NFL). He played college football for the Alabama Crimson Tide, and was selected by the Tampa Bay Buccaneers in the first round of the 2017 NFL draft. He was also a member of the Buffalo Bills, Houston Texans, and Las Vegas Raiders.

== Early life ==
Howard attended Autauga Academy in Prattville, Alabama.

Howard was rated by Rivals.com and Scout.com as a five-star recruit and was ranked by both as the best tight end in his class. He committed to the University of Alabama to play college football.

== College career ==
As a true freshman at Alabama in 2013, Howard played in 13 games with five starts. He made his collegiate debut with three receptions for 68 yards in a victory over Texas A&M. On October 19, against Arkansas, he scored his first collegiate touchdown. In his next game, a victory over LSU, he had a 52-yard receiving touchdown. He finished the year with 14 receptions for 269 yards and two touchdowns. As a sophomore in 2014, he had 17 receptions for 260 yards. His best performance of the season was when he had three receptions for 81 yards in a loss to Ole Miss. As a junior in 2015, Howard had 38 receptions for 602 yards and 2 touchdowns. He was the Offensive MVP of Alabama's victory over Clemson in the 2016 College Football Playoff National Championship after recording five receptions for 208 yards and two touchdowns. As a senior in 2016, he had 45 receptions for 595 yards and three touchdowns. His best performance of the season came in the National Championship rematch against Clemson. In the 35–31 loss, he had four receptions for 106 yards and a touchdown.

Howard was considered by some to be underutilized in the Crimson Tide offense despite back to back seasons recording the most receptions ever for a tight end under Saban at Alabama. When asked about Howard's role in the offense after the 2016 season, Saban said, "O.J., quite honestly, should have been more involved all year long."

Howard played for the South team in the 2017 Senior Bowl. He has stated that he tries to model his play off of Jason Witten, Jimmy Graham, and Jordan Reed.

== Professional career ==
=== Pre-draft ===
Coming out of college, Howard was projected as a first round pick by the majority of NFL experts and scouts. He received an invitation to the Senior Bowl and chose to participate although he was already a first round prospect. He was able to raise his stock by having a significant week of practice for the Senior Bowl and was voted by a panel of scouts as Senior Bowl's top practice player of the week. Howard finished the game with four catches for 39 receiving yards, helping the South defeat the North 16–15. He attended the NFL Combine and completed all the required combine and positional drills. At Alabama's Pro Day, he chose to only run positional drills for the representatives and scouts. Howard was ranked the top tight end in the draft by Sports Illustrated, ESPN, Pro Football Focus, NFLDraftScout.com, NFL analyst Mike Mayock, and NFL analyst Bucky Brooks.

Pre-draft measurables
Height	Weight	Arm length	Hand span	Wingspan	40-yard dash	10-yard split	20-yard split	20-yard shuttle	Three-cone drill	Vertical jump	Broad jump	Bench press	Wonderlic
6 ft 5 3/4 in (1.97 m)	251 lb (114 kg)	33 3/4 in (0.86 m)	10 in (0.25 m)	6 ft 8 5/8 in (2.05 m)	4.51 s	1.53 s	2.61 s	4.16 s	6.85 s	30 in (0.76 m)	10 ft 1 in (3.07 m)	22 reps	27
All values from NFL Combine

=== Tampa Bay Buccaneers ===
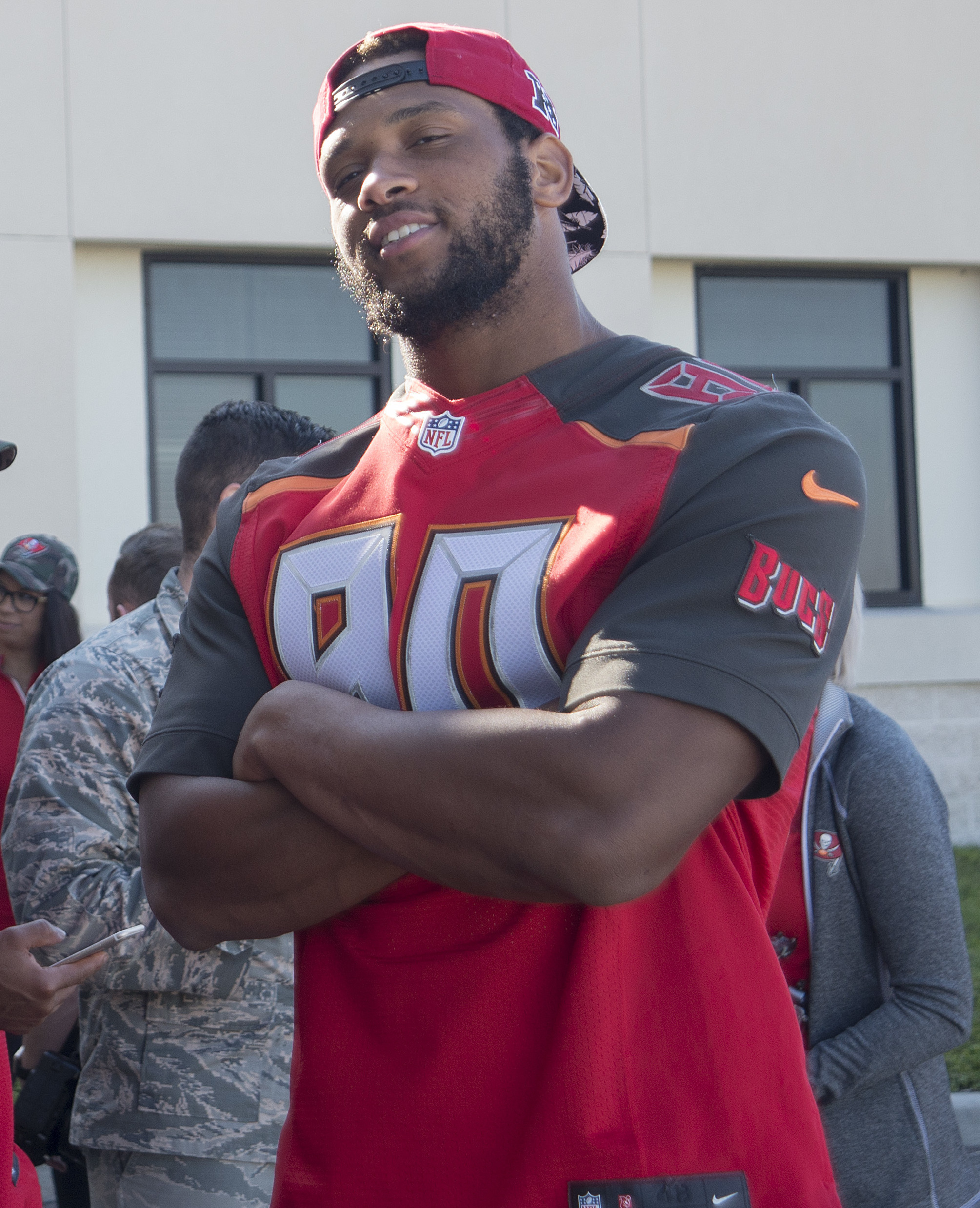
Howard with the Tampa Bay Buccaneers in 2018

==== 2017 season ====
The Tampa Bay Buccaneers selected Howard in the first round (19th overall) of the 2017 NFL draft. He was only the second Alabama tight end selected in the first round in the common draft era, after Ozzie Newsome in 1978. On May 22, 2017, Howard signed with the Buccaneers, a four-year deal worth $11 million featuring a $6.2 million signing bonus.

Howard entered the regular season as one of the starting tight ends along with veteran Cameron Brate.

Due to Hurricane Irma, the Buccaneers had to move their Week 1 game to later in the season. On September 17, 2017, in Week 2, Howard made his professional regular season debut and caught one reception for 17-yards in the Buccaneers 29–7 victory over the Chicago Bears. In Week 4, against the New York Giants, he recorded a 58-yard reception for the first touchdown of his career. In Week 7, against the Buffalo Bills, he had a breakout game with six receptions for 98 yards and two touchdowns. He was placed on injured reserve on December 20, 2017. He started the first 14 games his rookie season, finishing with 26 receptions for 432 yards and six touchdowns.

==== 2018 season ====
In Week 2, against the Philadelphia Eagles, Howard recorded a 75-yard touchdown reception from quarterback Ryan Fitzpatrick as part of a 96-yard performance in the victory. In Week 9, against the Carolina Panthers, he recorded two receiving touchdowns in the loss. On November 20, 2018, he was placed on injured reserve after suffering foot and ankle injuries in Week 11. He finished the season with 34 receptions for 565 yards and five touchdowns in ten games and eight starts.

==== 2019 season ====
Howard played in 14 games and recorded 34 receptions for 459 receiving yards and one receiving touchdown in the 2019 season.

==== 2020 season ====
On April 29, 2020, the Buccaneers exercised the fifth-year option on Howard's contract, worth $6.013 million guaranteed for the 2021 season. Howard recorded three catches for 50 yards and a touchdown during the 38–31 win over the Los Angeles Chargers in Week 4. He suffered a torn Achilles in the game, and was placed on injured reserve on October 6, 2020. He would go on to win his first Super Bowl ring with the team despite him not playing in the game due to injury as Tampa Bay beat the Kansas City Chiefs by a score of 31–9 in Super Bowl LV.

==== 2021 season ====
Howard played in 17 games and recorded 14 receptions for 135 receiving yards and one receiving touchdown in the 2021 season.

=== Buffalo Bills ===
On March 16, 2022, Howard signed a one-year contract with the Buffalo Bills. He was released by the Bills on August 30, as a part of final roster cuts.

=== Houston Texans ===
On September 2, 2022, Howard signed with the Houston Texans. In the Texans' 2022 regular season opener, Howard had two receiving touchdowns in the 20–20 tie to the Indianapolis Colts.

=== Las Vegas Raiders ===
On March 20, 2023, Howard signed with the Las Vegas Raiders. He was released by the Raiders on August 1.

== Career statistics ==
=== NFL ===
Legend
	Won the Super Bowl
**Bold**	Career high

Year	Team	Games		Receiving					Fumbles	
Year	Team	GP	GS	Rec	Yds	Avg	Lng	TD	Fum	Lost
2017	TB	14	**14**	26	432	**16.6**	58T	**6**	**3**	**2**
2018	TB	10	8	**34**	**565**	**16.6**	**75T**	5	0	0
2019	TB	14	**14**	**34**	459	13.5	33	1	1	1
2020	TB	4	1	11	146	13.3	33	2	0	0
2021	TB	**17**	9	14	135	9.6	21	1	0	0
2022	HOU	13	10	10	145	14.5	26	2	0	0
Career		72	56	129	1,882	14.6	75T	17	4	3

=== College ===
Season	Team	GP	Rec	Yds	Avg	TD
2013	Alabama	10	14	269	19.2	2
2014	Alabama	9	17	260	15.3	0
2015	Alabama	12	38	602	15.8	2
2016	Alabama	15	45	595	13.2	3
Total		46	114	1,726	15.1	7
