= Jamie Ison =

American politician

Jamie Norman Ison

Member of the Alabama House of Representatives from the 101st district
- In office November 6, 2002 – November 5, 2014
- Preceded by: Chris Pringle
- Succeeded by: Chris Pringle

Personal details
- Born: September 7, 1953 (age 72)
- Party: Republican

Jamie Ison (born September 7, 1953) is an American realtor and politician who served in the Alabama House of Representatives from the 101st district from 2002 to 2014. Mrs. Ison is a Commercial Realtor with White-Spunner Realty in Mobile, AL. She was appointed by Governor Kay Ivey to the State of Alabama Oil and Gas Board on January 23, 2020. In addition, she serves on the Mobile Judicial Commission, the Mobile Airport Authority, and the Alabama Charter School Commission.
