= Chris Pringle (politician) =

American politician

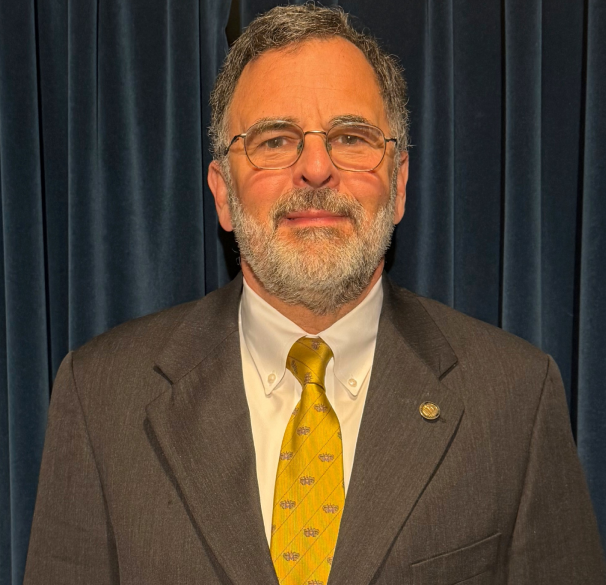

Speaker pro tempore of the Alabama House of Representatives
- Incumbent
- Assumed office January 10, 2023
- Preceded by: Victor Gaston

Member of the Alabama House of Representatives from the 101st district
- Incumbent
- Assumed office November 5, 2014
- Preceded by: Jamie Ison
- In office November 9, 1994 – November 6, 2002
- Preceded by: Mary Zoghby
- Succeeded by: Jamie Ison

Personal details
- Born: February 25, 1961 (age 65) Birmingham, Alabama, U.S.
- Party: Republican
- Education: University of Alabama, Tuscaloosa (BA)

Chris Pringle (born February 25, 1961) is an American real estate agent and Republican politician who represents the 101st district (part of the Mobile, Alabama metropolitan area) in the Alabama House of Representatives.

== Early and family life ==
Born in Birmingham, Alabama, Pringle graduated from the University of Alabama, Tuscaloosa, receiving a BA degree in communications. He also graduated from the American Campaign Academy in Washington, D.C.

== Career ==
Pringle is a businessman and real estate agent from Mobile, Alabama, whose clients include Southern Timberlands. He is also a member of the Gulf Coast Conservation Association. He was finance director or regional director for the political campaigns of Perry Hand, Guy Hunt, Bob Dole, Sonny Callahan and Thomas J. Harrelson, as well as on the congressional staffs of Congressmen Jack Edwards and Sonny Callahan.

Pringle first won election in his own right to the Alabama House of Representatives in 1994, from the 101st district. He defeated decade-long incumbent Ken Kvalheim in the Republican primary. In the general election Pringle defeated Mary Zoghby, an incumbent Democrat from the 97th district, whose district had changed after census reapportionment. Pringle won re-election until 2002, when he decided to give up his seat in the Alabama House in order to run for the U.S. House of Representatives from Alabama's First Congressional District upon Sonny Callahan's retirement. However, Jo Bonner defeated Pringle and five other candidates in the Republican primary and also won the general election.

In 2014, after his successor in the 101st district, Jamie Ison, announced she would not seek re-election but instead concentrate on her real estate business and other interests, Pringle resumed his own political career, again winning the seat, and later re-election. Pringle ran for the U.S. Congress again in 2020, but again lost in the Republican primary for the seat held by Bradley Byrne, who chose to run in the Republican primary for the 2020 United States Senate election in Alabama but failed to qualify for the runoff.

Alabama House of Representatives
Preceded by Victor Gaston	Speaker pro tempore of the Alabama House of Representatives; 2023–present	Incumbent
