= Mac McCutcheon (Alabama politician) =

American politician (born 1952)

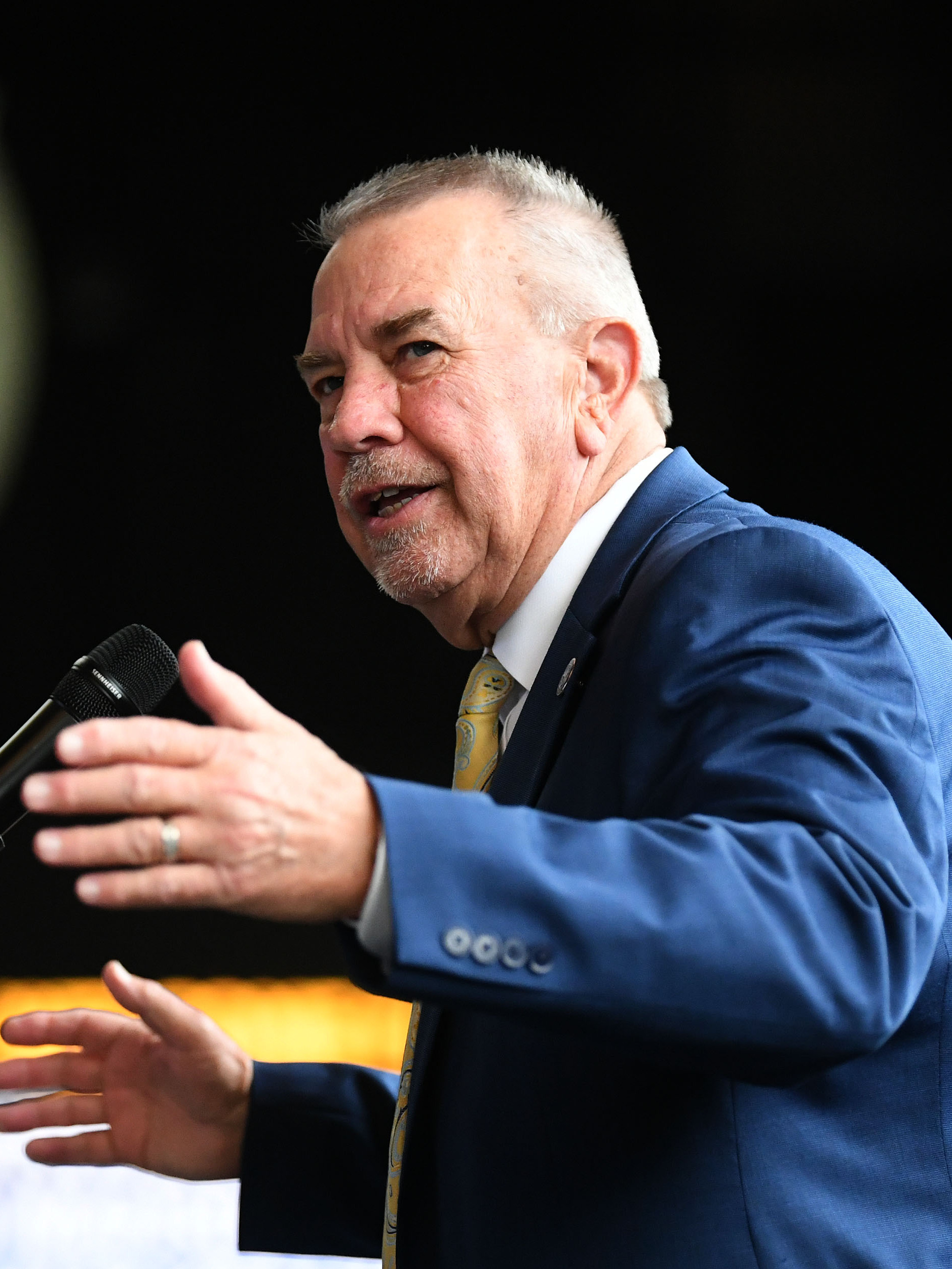
- McCutcheon in 2024

Chair of the Madison County Commission
- Incumbent
- Assumed office January 31, 2023
- Preceded by: Dale Strong

66th Speaker of the Alabama House of Representatives
- In office August 15, 2016 – November 9, 2022
- Preceded by: Victor Gaston (acting)
- Succeeded by: Nathaniel Ledbetter

Member of the Alabama House of Representatives from the 25th district
- In office November 8, 2006 – November 9, 2022
- Preceded by: Ray Garner
- Succeeded by: Phillip Rigsby

Personal details
- Born: Chester Clarence McCutcheon III; July 15, 1952 (age 74) Madison County, Alabama, U.S.
- Party: Republican
- Education: Trinity University, Texas (BA)

Chester Clarence "Mac" McCutcheon III (born July 15, 1952) is an American politician currently serving as the chair of the county commission of Madison County, Alabama. He was previously the 66th speaker of the Alabama House of Representatives. He is a Republican who served in the state legislature from 2006 to 2022. He was elected Speaker of the Alabama House of Representatives on August 15, 2016. He was re-elected Speaker of the House on January 8, 2019.

McCutcheon did not seek re-election to his House seat in the 2022 election cycle, and was succeeded by Nathaniel Ledbetter as speaker in 2023, and by Phillip Rigsby as representative of the 25th district. He was appointed to his role on the Madison County Commission by Governor Kay Ivey on January 31, 2023, fulfilling the remainder of Dale Strong's term after Strong was elected to the U.S. House of Representatives.

McCutcheon has a bachelor's degree in criminal justice administration from Trinity University. He was a police officer in Huntsville, Alabama prior to his election to the state legislature. He has also worked as a farmer and is a member of College Park Church of God.

== Political positions ==
=== Gas tax increase ===
In August 2017, Alabama state senator Arthur Orr (R-Decatur) said he would introduce legislation during the next session, an election year, that would allow local Alabama commissions "to ask voters in their counties to raise a local gasoline tax for specific road projects." The proposal received a mixed reception among local officials. Bills to increase the state gas tax have died in recent legislative sessions. McCutcheon stated that while discussions would continue, passing the bill would be unlikely. "In an election year, the reality of getting legislators to vote for any type of revenue measure will be tough," McCutcheon said.

Political offices
| Preceded by Victor Gaston; Acting | Speaker of the Alabama House of Representatives; 2016–2023 | Succeeded by Nathaniel Ledbetter |
