= Scott Stadthagen =

American politician

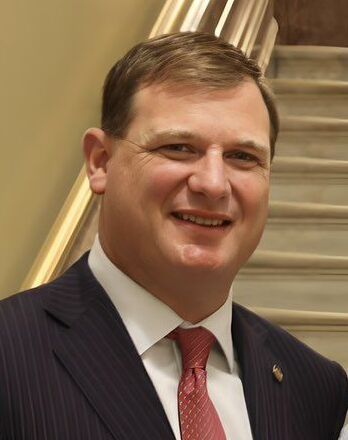
- Stadthagen in 2023

Chair of the Alabama Republican Party
- Incumbent
- Assumed office March 7, 2026
- Preceded by: Joan Reynolds (acting)

Majority Leader of the Alabama House of Representatives
- In office January 10, 2023 – February 18, 2026
- Preceded by: Nathaniel Ledbetter
- Succeeded by: Paul Lee

Member of the Alabama House of Representatives from the 9th district
- Incumbent
- Assumed office January 2019
- Preceded by: Ed Henry

Personal details
- Born: Gregory Scott Stadthagen Jr. August 9, 1977 (age 49)
- Party: Republican
- Spouse: Amy Stadthagen (m. 2009)
- Children: 1
- Education: University of West Alabama (BS)

Gregory Scott Stadthagen Jr. is an American politician who is a member of the Alabama House of Representatives, representing the 9th district since 2018. He was elected under the Republican Party and, as of 2026, is the incumbent chair of the Alabama Republican Party.

Stadthagen held the position of majority leader in the Alabama House of Representatives from 2022 to 2026. He resigned from the majority leader position to run for chair of the Alabama Republican Party; Stadthagen was elected and sworn in as chairman on March 7, 2026.

== Education and early career ==
Stadthagen graduated from the University of West Alabama with a B.S. in 2002.

Stadthagen started his business, Hagen Homes Incorporated, in 2005, which he owned until 2018, when he announced his run for the Alabama House of Representatives. He holds many local leadership positions in Hartselle, including Chair of the Hartselle Area Chamber Commerce, member of the Economic Development group of Hartselle, member of the Morgan County Builders Association, member of the Hartselle Rotary, member of the Hartselle Kiwanis, and member of the Leadership of Hartselle Association.

== Political career ==
Stadthagen won the 2018 Republican primary for Alabama House District 9 with 62.4% of the vote before running unopposed in the general election.

Stadthagen has sponsored numerous bills targeting LGBT people as part of the larger 2020s anti-LGBT movement. In February 2022, he introduced House Bill 322, a bathroom bill targeting transgender students. The bill was later amended by the Alabama Senate to include a restriction of classroom discussion or instruction about sexual orientation or gender identity from kindergarten through fifth grade, drawing comparisons to Florida's Don't Say Gay bill. "The aims of the bill are not controversial — or, at least, they weren’t controversial until the Left made the simple act of going to the bathroom a political issue," said Stadthagen after the bill was signed into law by Governor Kay Ivey in April. "I refuse to play politics with the safety of Alabama’s schoolchildren." In April 2023, Stadthagen was one of six Republicans who introduced House Bill 401, which looked to ban drag performances in public spaces where minors were present by amending the Anti-Obscenity Enforcement Act to expand the definition of "sexual conduct" to include drag. The proposal did not make it into law.

After winning reelection in 2022, Stadthagen was chosen by the Republican caucus as the majority leader of the Alabama House of Representatives; he was inaugurated in that position in January 2023.

In October 2023, Stadthagen was honored by the American Legislative Exchange Council as one of the top "50 under 50" legislators who represented the conservative think tank's principles and values.

In February 2026, Stadthagen resigned as majority leader of the Alabama House of Representatives ahead of a campaign to become the next chair of the Alabama Republican Party, following the resignation of John Wahl. Stadthagen won the internal election on March 7, 2026, defeating former Alabama Secretary of State John Merrill and acting chair Joan Reynolds.

=== Committee positions ===
Stadthagen is a member of the Fiscal Responsibility, Rules, and State Government committees.

== Elections ==
=== Alabama House of Representatives District 9 ===
==== 2018 Republican primary ====
2018 Republican Primary
Party	Candidate	Votes	%
Republican	Scott Stadthagen	4,664	62.4%
Republican	Justin Morrow	1,563	20.9%
Republican	James Bowling	1,245	16.7%
Total votes		7,472	100.0%

==== 2018 general election ====
2018 General Election
Party	Candidate	Votes	%
Republican	Scott Stadthagen	13,297	99.1%
Write-in		127	0.9%
Total votes		13,424	100.0%

==== 2022 general election ====
2022 General Election
Party	Candidate	Votes	%
Republican	Scott Stadthagen (incumbent)	11,041	91.83%
Libertarian	Gregory Bodine	953	7.93%
Write-in		29	0.24%
Total votes		12,023	100

Alabama House of Representatives
Preceded by Nathaniel Ledbetter	Majority Leader of the Alabama House of Representatives; 2023–2026	Succeeded by Paul Lee
Party political offices
Preceded by Joan Reynolds; Acting	Chair of the Alabama Republican Party; 2026–present	Incumbent
