= 2020 United States Senate election in Alabama =

- November 3, 2020
- Turnout: 63.1% ▲
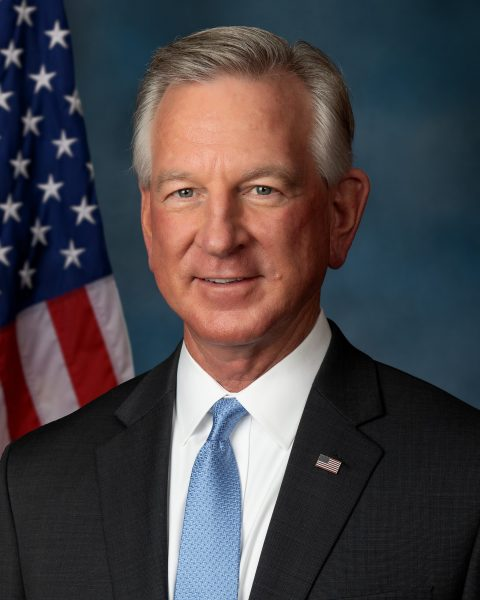

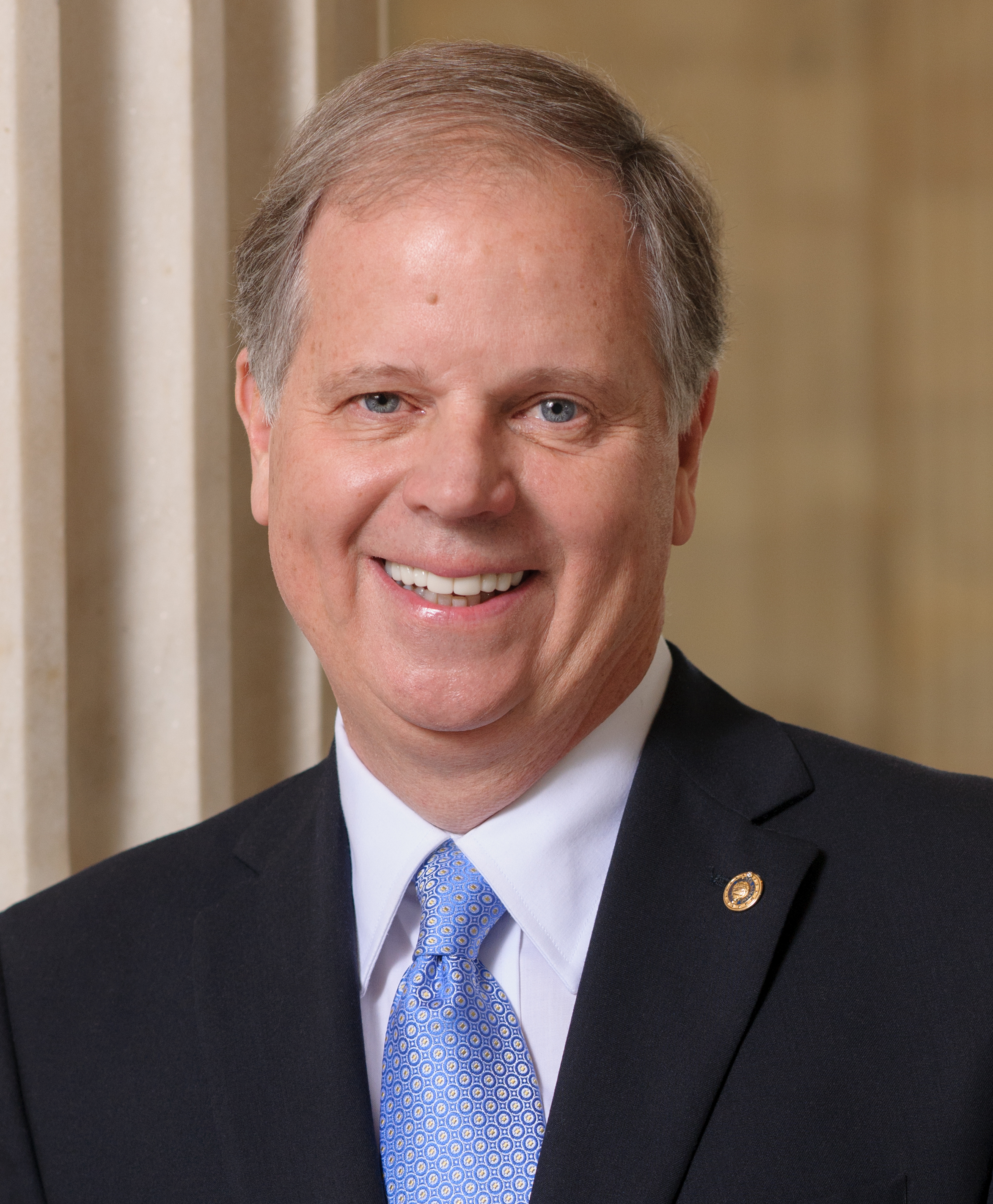
Nominee	Tommy Tuberville	Doug Jones
Party	Republican	Democratic
Popular vote	1,392,076	920,478
Percentage	60.10%	39.74%
- Tuberville: 50–60% 60–70% 70–80% 80–90% >90% Jones: 40–50% 50–60% 60–70% 70–80% 80–90% >90% Tie: 50% No data
U.S. senator before election
Doug Jones
Democratic
Elected U.S. senator
Tommy Tuberville
Republican

The 2020 United States Senate election in Alabama was held on November 3, 2020, to elect a member of the United States Senate to represent the State of Alabama, concurrently with the 2020 U.S. presidential election, as well as other elections to the United States Senate in other states, elections to the United States House of Representatives, and various state and local elections. Incumbent senator Doug Jones, first elected in a 2017 special election in what was widely labeled a major upset, ran for a full term, facing Tommy Tuberville in the general election. This race was one of two Democratic-held U.S. Senate seats up for election in 2020 in a state President Trump won in 2016.

Jones was widely considered the most vulnerable senator among those seeking re-election in 2020 due to Alabama's heavy Republican lean, with analysts predicting a Republican pickup; Jones's 2017 win was in part due to sexual misconduct allegations against his Republican opponent Roy Moore.

As was predicted, Tuberville easily defeated Jones, whose 20.36% margin of defeat was the largest for an incumbent U.S. Senator since Arkansas' Blanche Lincoln in 2010. Tuberville received the highest percentage of the vote for any challenger since Joseph D. Tydings in 1964. Jones became the first Democratic senator to lose a general election in Alabama, and the only Democratic senator to be defeated in 2020. However, he outperformed Biden in the state by about five points. This was the only Republican flip of the 2020 U.S. Senate elections. Tuberville was later elected Governor of Alabama in 2026 in a rematch with Jones.

== Background ==
Despite Doug Jones flipping the seat in a 2017 special election, Alabama is a solidly Republican state at both the federal and statewide levels. Jones was the first Democrat to win a statewide election in Alabama since Lucy Baxley won the 2008 Alabama Public Service Commission election. Trump also won Alabama by around 30% in the 2016 presidential election. Due to those factors, Jones was widely seen as the most vulnerable incumbent senator in 2020.

== Democratic primary ==
The candidate filing deadline was November 8, 2019. Jones ran unopposed.

=== Candidates ===
==== Nominee ====
- Doug Jones, incumbent U.S. senator

==== Declined ====
- John Rogers, state representative
- Randall Woodfin, mayor of Birmingham (endorsed Jones)

=== Endorsements ===
Doug Jones

U.S. senators

- Kamala Harris, U.S. senator (CA) (2017–2021), candidate for President of the United States in 2020, Democratic nominee for Vice President of the United States in 2020
- Amy Klobuchar, U.S. senator (MN) and candidate for President of the United States in 2020
- Joe Manchin, U.S. senator (WV)

U.S. representatives

- Terri Sewell (AL-7)

Local officials

- Stacey Abrams, Democratic nominee for Governor of Georgia in 2018, former Minority Leader of the Georgia House of Representatives
- Randall Woodfin, Mayor of Birmingham

Individuals

- Michael O'Neill, actor

Organizations

- End Citizens United
- Human Rights Campaign
- League of Conservation Voters
- National Organization for Women

== Republican primary ==
=== Candidates ===
==== Nominee ====
- Tommy Tuberville, former Auburn Tigers football head coach

==== Eliminated in runoff ====
- Jeff Sessions, former United States attorney general (2017–2018), former holder of this seat (1997–2017), and former attorney general of Alabama (1995–1997)

==== Eliminated in primary ====
- Stanley Adair, businessman
- Bradley Byrne, incumbent U.S. representative for Alabama's 1st congressional district
- Arnold Mooney, state representative
- Roy Moore, former chief justice of the Alabama Supreme Court, former candidate for Governor of Alabama in 2006 and 2010 and nominee for the U.S. Senate in 2017
- Ruth Page Nelson, community activist

==== Withdrew ====
- Marty Preston Hatley
- John Merrill, Secretary of State of Alabama
- John Paul Serbin

==== Declined ====
- Robert Aderholt, incumbent U.S. representative for Alabama's 4th congressional district (ran for re-election)
- Will Ainsworth, Alabama lieutenant governor
- Mo Brooks, incumbent U.S. representative for Alabama's 5th congressional district and candidate for U.S. Senate in 2017 (ran for re-election)
- Will Dismukes, state representative
- Matt Gaetz, incumbent U.S. representative for Florida's 1st congressional district (ran for re-election)
- Del Marsh, president pro tempore of the Alabama Senate
- Arthur Orr, state senator (endorsed Byrne)
- Martha Roby, incumbent U.S. representative for Alabama's 2nd congressional district
- Heather Whitestone, former Miss America

=== Endorsements ===
Bradley Byrne (eliminated)

Federal officials

- Liz Cheney, U.S. representative (WY-AL)

State officials

- Tom Butler, state senator and former state representative (1982–1994)
- Arthur Orr, state senator
Arnold Mooney (eliminated)

Federal officials

- Mo Brooks, U.S. representative (AL-05) and Republican candidate in the 2017 United States Senate special election in Alabama
- Mike Lee, U.S. senator (UT)
- Mark Levin, former Chief of Staff to U.S. Attorney General Edwin Meese and U.S. Deputy Assistant Secretary of Education
- Rand Paul, U.S. senator (KY)

Organizations

- Senate Conservatives Fund

Individuals

- Erick Erickson, blogger
Jeff Sessions (eliminated)

Federal officials

- John Ashcroft, former U.S. Attorney General (2001-2005)
- John Barrasso, U.S. senator (WY)
- Roy Blunt, U.S. senator (MO) and former U.S. representative (MO-07) (1997–2011)
- John Boozman, U.S. senator (AR) and former U.S. Representative (AR-03) (2001–2011)
- Mike Crapo, U.S. senator (ID) and former U.S. representative (ID-02) (1993–1999)
- Mike Enzi, U.S. senator (WY)
- Deb Fischer, U.S. senator (NE)
- Jim Inhofe, U.S. senator (OK) and former U.S. representative (R-OK-01) (1987–1994)
- Johnny Isakson, former U.S. senator (GA) (2005–2019) and U.S. Representative (R-GA-06) (1999–2005)
- Ron Johnson, U.S. senator (WI)
- Pat Roberts, U.S. senator (KS) and former U.S. Representative (KS-01) (1981–1997)
- Richard Shelby, U.S. senator (AL) and former U.S. Representative (AL-07) (1979–1987)

Organizations

- New York Young Republican Club
- NRA Political Victory Fund

Individuals

- Tucker Carlson, journalist and political commentator
Tommy Tuberville

Federal officials

- Donald Trump, 45th president of the United States (2017–2021)

State officials

- Will Ainsworth, lieutenant governor
- Tom Whatley, state senator

Organizations

- Club for Growth
- National Association for Gun Rights

Individuals

- Randy Owen, country music artist, lead singer of Alabama
- Bruce Pearl, head coach of the Auburn Tigers men's basketball team
- Sean Spicer, former White House Press Secretary (2017)

=== First round ===
==== Polling ====
Poll source	Date(s) administered	Sample size (Note: Key: A – all adults RV – registered voters LV – likely voters V – unclear)	Margin of error	Stanley Adair	Mo Brooks	Bradley Byrne	Del Marsh	John Merrill	Arnold Mooney	Roy Moore	Ruth Page Nelson	Gary Palmer	Jeff Sessions	Tommy Tuberville	Other	Undecided
WPA Intelligence (Note: The Club for Growth is a PAC supporting the Donald Trump 2020 presidential campaign and has also endorsed Tuberville)	February 18–19, 2020	607 (LV)	± 4%	<1%	–	17%	–	–	<1%	5%	–	–	29%	32%	<1%	15%
WPA Intelligence	February 10–12, 2020	600 (LV)	± 4%	<1%	–	17%	–	–	1%	6%	<1%	–	34%	29%	–	15%
Harper Polling (Note: Poll sponsored by the Bradley Byrne campaign)	February 8–9, 2020	609 (LV)	± 3.97%	–	–	26%	–	–	–	5%	–	–	31%	24%	–	14%
Mason-Dixon	February 4–6, 2020	400 (LV)	± 5.0%	–	–	17%	–	–	–	5%	–	–	31%	29%	2%	16%
OnMessage (Note: Poll sponsored by the Jeff Sessions campaign)	January 13–15, 2020	700 (LV)	± 2.5%	–	–	22%	–	–	–	–	–	–	43%	21%	–	–
OnMessage	December 3–5, 2019	700 (LV)	± 3.7%	–	–	14%	–	–	1%	7%	1%	–	44%	21%	–	12%
Cherry Communications (Note: Poll sponsored by FarmPAC)	December 1–3, 2019	600 (LV)	± 4.0%	1%	–	12%	–	–	1%	8%	–	–	35%	31%	–	–
WPA Intelligence	October 29–31, 2019	511 (V)	± 4.4%	–	–	11%	–	6%	2%	11%	–	–	36%	23%	–	–
Cygnal	October 10–12, 2019	536 (LV)	–	1%	–	18%	–	9%	2%	11%	–	–	–	32%	–	28%
Tommy for Senate (Note: Internal poll from Tuberville's campaign)	Released on October 5, 2019	– (LV) (Note: Not yet released)	–	1%	–	13%	–	9%	1%	15%	–	–	–	36%	–	26%
Moore Information (Note: Poll sponsored by the Tommy Tuberville campaign.)	August 11–13, 2019	400 (LV)	± 5.0%	–	–	17%	–	13%	1%	15%	–	–	–	33%	3%	17%
Cygnal	June 22–23, 2019	612 (LV)	4.0%	–	–	21%	–	12%	2%	13%	–	–	–	29%	–	22%
Cygnal	June 22–23, 2019	612 (LV)	4.0%	–	–	13%	–	8%	–	9%	–	–	29%	21%	–	–
Moore Information	June 10–11, 2019	650 (LV)	± 4.0%	–	–	16%	–	7%	2%	18%	–	–	–	23%	6%	28%
Mason-Dixon	April 9–11, 2019	400 (RV)	± 5.0%	–	18%	13%	4%	–	–	27%	–	11%	–	–	2% (Note: Tim James with 2%)	25%
Victory Phones (Note: Poll produced, according to Mo Brooks, by a group attempting to persuade him to enter this race)	Released in February 2019	400 (LV)	± 5.0%	–	30%	17%	7%	–	–	–	–	12%	–	–	6%	27%

==== Primary results ====
Initial primary round results by county Tuberville: 30–40%; 40–50%; 50–60%; Sessions: 30–40%; 40–50%; 50–60%; Byrne: 30–40%; 40–50%; 50–60%; 60–70%

Republican primary results
Party	Candidate	Votes	%
Republican	Tommy Tuberville	239,616	33.39%
Republican	Jeff Sessions	227,088	31.64%
Republican	Bradley Byrne	178,627	24.89%
Republican	Roy Moore	51,377	7.16%
Republican	Ruth Page Nelson	7,200	1.00%
Republican	Arnold Mooney	7,149	1.00%
Republican	Stanley Adair	6,608	0.92%
Total votes		717,665	100.00%

=== Runoff ===
The runoff for the Republican Senate nomination was planned for March 31, 2020, but it was delayed until July 14 as a result of the COVID-19 pandemic.

==== Polling ====
Poll source	Date(s) administered	Sample size	Margin of error	Jeff Sessions	Tommy Tuberville	Other / Undecided
Auburn University at Montgomery	July 2–9, 2020	558 (RV)	± 6%	31%	47%	22% (Note: Undecided with 22%)
OnMessage (R)	May 26–27, 2020	600 (LV)	± 3.46%	43%	49%	8% (Note: Undecided with 8%)
FM3 Research (D) (Note: Poll sponsored by Jones' campaign.)	May 14–18, 2020	– (LV)	–	32%	54%	14% (Note: Undecided with 14%)
Cygnal	May 7–10, 2020	607 (LV)	± 3.98%	32%	55%	13%
FM3 Research (D)	March, 2020	– (LV)	–	36%	54%	10% (Note: Undecided with 10%)
OnMessage (R)	March 8–9, 2020	800 (LV)	± 3.46%	45%	45%	10%
Cygnal	March 6–8, 2020	645 (LV)	+ 3.86%	40%	52%	8%
Moore Information Group	March 5–7, 2020	400 (LV)	± 5%	38%	49%	13%
WT&S Consulting	March 5, 2020	1,234 (LV)	+ 3.29%	42%	49%	8%
Mason-Dixon	February 4–6, 2020	400 (LV)	± 5.0%	49%	42%	9%

Hypothetical polling

with Bradley Byrne and Gary Palmer

Poll source	Date(s) administered	Sample size	Margin of error	Bradley Byrne	Gary Palmer	Undecided
WPA Intelligence (R) (Note: Poll sponsored by Club for Growth Action)	February 10–12, 2019	500 (LV)	± 4.4%	27%	27%	46%

with Bradley Byrne and Jeff Sessions

Poll source	Date(s) administered	Sample size	Margin of error	Bradley Byrne	Jeff Sessions	Undecided
AL Daily News/Mason-Dixon	February 4–6, 2020	400 (LV)	± 5.0%	35%	48%	17%

with Mo Brooks and Bradley Byrne

Poll source	Date(s) administered	Sample size	Margin of error	Mo Brooks	Bradley Byrne	Undecided
WPA Intelligence (R)	March 10–12, 2019	501 (LV)	± 4.4%	43%	32%	25%

with Mo Brooks and Roy Moore

Poll source	Date(s) administered	Sample size	Margin of error	Mo Brooks	Roy Moore	Undecided
WPA Intelligence (R) (Note: Standard VI response)	March 10–12, 2019	501 (LV)	± 4.4%	52%	32%	16%

==== Results ====
Runoff results by county Tuberville: 50–60%; 60–70%; 70–80%; Sessions: 50–60%

Republican primary runoff results
Party	Candidate	Votes	%
Republican	Tommy Tuberville	334,675	60.73%
Republican	Jeff Sessions	216,452	39.27%
Total votes		551,127	100.00%

== Independents ==
=== Candidates ===
==== Withdrawn ====
- Mike Parrish
- Jarmal Sanders, reverend
- Marcus Jejaun Williams

== General election ==
=== Predictions ===
Source	Ranking	As of
The Cook Political Report	Lean R (flip)	October 29, 2020
Inside Elections	Lean R (flip)	October 28, 2020
Sabato's Crystal Ball	Likely R (flip)	November 2, 2020
Daily Kos	Likely R (flip)	October 30, 2020
Politico	Lean R (flip)	November 2, 2020
RCP	Likely R (flip)	October 23, 2020
DDHQ	Safe R (flip)	November 3, 2020
538	Likely R (flip)	November 2, 2020
Economist	Safe R (flip)	November 2, 2020

=== Post-primary endorsements ===
Doug Jones (D)

Individuals

- Charles C. Krulak, retired Marine Corps general and former Joint Chiefs of Staff member (Republican)

Organizations

- Feminist Majority PAC
- Joint Action Committee for Political Affairs
- National Committee to Preserve Social Security and Medicare
- Natural Resources Defense Council Action Fund

Unions

- Alabama AFL-CIO
- International Federation of Professional and Technical Engineers
- United Auto Workers
Tommy Tuberville (R)

Senators

- Ted Cruz, U.S. senator from Texas

Organizations

- NRA Political Victory Fund

=== Polling ===
View source data.

Poll source	Date(s) administered	Sample size	Margin of error	Doug Jones (D)	Tommy Tuberville (R)	Other	Undecided
Swayable	October 27 – November 1, 2020	294 (LV)	± 8.5%	42%	58%	–	–
Data for Progress	October 27 – November 1, 2020	1,045 (LV)	± 3%	44%	56%	0% (Note: "Other candidate or write-in" with 0%)	–
Morning Consult	October 22–31, 2020	850 (LV)	± 3%	39%	51%	–	–
Auburn University At Montgomery	October 23–28, 2020	853 (LV)	± 4.4%	43%	54%	3%	–
Swayable	October 23–26, 2020	232 (LV)	± 8.7%	46%	54%	–	–
Cygnal	October 21–23, 2020	645 (LV)	± 3.9%	41%	55%	–	4%
Moore Information (R)	October 11–14, 2020	504 (LV)	± 4.5%	40%	55%	–	–
FM3 Research (D)	October 11–14, 2020	801 (LV)	± 3.5%	48%	47%	–	5% (Note: Includes "Refused")
Auburn University at Montgomery	September 30 – October 3, 2020	1,072 (RV)	± 4.0%	42%	54%	4%	–
Morning Consult	September 11–20, 2020	658 (LV)	± (2% – 7%)	34%	52%	–	–
Morning Consult	July 24 – August 2, 2020	609 (LV)	± 4.0%	35%	52%	4% (Note: "Someone else" with 4%)	9%
Auburn University at Montgomery	July 2–9, 2020	567 (RV)	± 5.1%	36%	44%	7% (Note: "Write-in candidate" with 7%)	14%
WPA Intelligence (R) (Note: Poll sponsored by the Club for Growth, which supports exclusively Republican candidates.)	June 29 – July 2, 2020	509 (LV) (Note: Additional data sourced from FiveThirtyEight)	± 3.8%	40%	50%	–	–
ALG Research (D)	June 18–22, 2020	600 (LV)	± 4.0%	44%	47%	1%	8%
Cygnal (R)	June 13–16, 2020	530 (LV)	± 4.3%	36%	50%	2% (Note: Parrish (I) with 2%)	13%
FM3 Research (D)	May 14–18, 2020	601 (LV)	± 4.0%	44%	47%	–	9%
Mason-Dixon	February 4–6, 2020	625 (RV)	± 4.0%	42%	50%	–	8%
JMC Analytics	December 16–18, 2019	525 (LV)	± 4.3%	40%	47%	–	13%

Hypothetical polling

With Jeff Sessions

Poll source	Date(s) administered	Sample size	Margin of error	Doug Jones (D)	Jeff Sessions (R)	Other	Undecided
Auburn University at Montgomery	July 2–9, 2020	567 (RV)	± 5.1%	43%	49%	7% (Note: "Write-in candidate" with 7%)	1%
ALG Research (D)	June 18–22, 2020	600 (LV)	± 4.0%	43%	45%	3%	9%
Cygnal (R)	June 13–16, 2020	530 (LV)	± 4.3%	35%	45%	3% (Note: Parrish (I) with 3%)	18%
Mason-Dixon	February 4–6, 2020	625 (RV)	± 4.0%	41%	54%	–	5%
JMC Analytics	December 16–18, 2019	525 (LV)	± 4.3%	41%	46%	–	13%

With Bradley Byrne

Poll source	Date(s) administered	Sample size	Margin of error	Doug Jones (D)	Bradley Byrne (R)	Undecided
AL Daily News/Mason-Dixon	February 4–6, 2020	625 (RV)	± 4.0%	42%	51%	7%
JMC Analytics	December 16–18, 2019	525 (LV)	± 4.3%	40%	44%	16%

With Arnold Mooney

Poll source	Date(s) administered	Sample size	Margin of error	Doug Jones (D)	Arnold Mooney (R)	Undecided
JMC Analytics	December 16–18, 2019	525 (LV)	± 4.3%	40%	34%	25%

With Roy Moore

Poll source	Date(s) administered	Sample size	Margin of error	Doug Jones (D)	Roy Moore (R)	Undecided
JMC Analytics	December 16–18, 2019	525 (LV)	± 4.3%	47%	33%	20%

With Generic Republican

Poll source	Date(s) administered	Sample size	Margin of error	Doug Jones (D)	Generic Republican	Undecided
Mason-Dixon	Apr 9–11, 2019	625 (RV)	± 4.0%	40%	50%	10%

With Generic Opponent

Poll source	Date(s) administered	Sample size	Margin of error	Doug Jones (D)	Generic Opponent	Undecided
JMC Analytics	December 16–18, 2019	525 (LV)	± 4.3%	34%	48% (Note: "Jones does not deserve to be re-elected" with 48% as opposed to "Jones deserves to be re-elected")	18%

with Generic Democrat and Generic Republican

Poll source	Date(s) administered	Sample size	Margin of error	Generic Democrat	Generic Republican	Undecided
Cygnal	October 21–23, 2020	645 (LV)	± 3.9%	38%	55%	6%

== Results ==
2020 United States Senate election in Alabama
Party	Candidate	Votes	%	±%
Republican	Tommy Tuberville	1,392,076	60.10%	+11.76%
Democratic	Doug Jones (incumbent)	920,478	39.74%	−10.23%
Write-in		3,891	0.17%	−1.52%
Total votes		2,316,445	100.00%	N/A
Republican gain from Democratic				

=== By county ===
County	Doug Jones Democratic		Tommy Tuberville Republican		Write-in Various		Margin		Total votes
County	Votes	%	Votes	%	Votes	%	Votes	%	Votes
Autauga	8,277	29.87%	19,387	69.97%	43	0.16%	11,110	40.10%	27,707
Baldwin	28,925	26.45%	80,200	73.34%	225	0.21%	51,275	46.89%	109,350
Barbour	5,021	47.91%	5,449	52.00%	9	0.09%	428	4.08%	10,479
Bibb	2,244	23.42%	7,320	76.40%	17	0.18%	5,076	52.98%	9,581
Blount	3,290	11.96%	24,163	87.85%	53	0.19%	20,873	75.89%	27,506
Bullock	3,490	75.87%	1,108	24.09%	2	0.04%	-2,382	-51.78%	4,600
Butler	4,193	44.44%	5,232	55.45%	11	0.12%	1,039	11.01%	9,436
Calhoun	16,808	33.07%	33,936	66.78%	77	0.15%	17,128	33.70%	50,821
Chambers	6,908	45.35%	8,312	54.56%	14	0.09%	1,404	9.22%	15,234
Cherokee	2,112	17.24%	10,122	82.62%	17	0.14%	8,010	65.38%	12,251
Chilton	3,499	18.20%	15,708	81.69%	22	0.11%	12,209	63.49%	19,229
Choctaw	3,225	43.49%	4,188	56.47%	3	0.04%	963	12.99%	7,416
Clarke	6,017	45.98%	7,061	53.95%	9	0.07%	1,044	7.98%	13,087
Clay	1,441	20.87%	5,454	79.01%	8	0.12%	4,013	58.13%	6,903
Cleburne	843	11.76%	6,321	88.17%	5	0.07%	5,478	76.41%	7,169
Coffee	5,753	25.94%	16,400	73.95%	25	0.11%	10,647	48.01%	22,178
Colbert	9,408	33.86%	18,320	65.94%	53	0.19%	8,912	32.08%	27,781
Conecuh	3,098	48.44%	3,294	51.50%	4	0.06%	196	3.06%	6,396
Coosa	1,899	34.74%	3,559	65.10%	9	0.16%	1,660	30.36%	5,467
Covington	3,214	18.52%	14,120	81.37%	19	0.11%	10,906	62.85%	17,353
Crenshaw	1,910	28.99%	4,671	70.89%	8	0.12%	2,761	41.90%	6,589
Cullman	5,693	13.64%	35,949	86.14%	93	0.22%	30,256	72.50%	41,735
Dale	5,955	30.32%	13,653	69.51%	33	0.17%	7,698	39.19%	19,641
Dallas	12,503	70.18%	5,298	29.74%	15	0.08%	-7,205	-40.44%	17,816
DeKalb	5,253	17.96%	23,940	81.86%	53	0.18%	18,687	63.90%	29,246
Elmore	11,399	27.86%	29,459	72.00%	60	0.15%	18,060	44.14%	40,918
Escambia	5,400	34.11%	10,417	65.80%	14	0.09%	5,017	31.69%	15,831
Etowah	13,145	27.62%	34,351	72.18%	93	0.20%	21,206	44.56%	47,589
Fayette	1,651	18.87%	7,088	81.00%	12	0.14%	5,437	62.13%	8,751
Franklin	2,605	20.87%	9,856	78.97%	20	0.16%	7,251	58.10%	12,481
Geneva	2,122	16.95%	10,382	82.91%	18	0.14%	8,260	65.96%	12,522
Greene	3,962	82.90%	816	17.07%	1	0.02%	-3,146	-65.83%	4,779
Hale	4,786	60.74%	3,090	39.21%	4	0.05%	-1,696	-21.52%	7,880
Henry	2,872	30.95%	6,399	68.95%	9	0.10%	3,527	38.01%	9,280
Houston	14,494	31.49%	31,462	68.35%	77	0.17%	16,968	36.86%	46,033
Jackson	4,587	19.52%	18,888	80.36%	29	0.12%	14,301	60.84%	23,504
Jefferson	190,644	58.57%	134,314	41.26%	552	0.17%	-56,330	-17.31%	325,510
Lamar	1,071	14.95%	6,088	85.00%	3	0.04%	5,017	70.05%	7,162
Lauderdale	13,874	31.51%	30,071	68.29%	88	0.20%	16,197	36.78%	44,033
Lawrence	4,211	26.39%	11,710	73.40%	33	0.21%	7,499	47.00%	15,954
Lee	29,986	42.08%	41,154	57.76%	114	0.16%	11,168	15.67%	71,254
Limestone	15,584	31.78%	33,364	68.04%	90	0.18%	17,780	36.26%	49,038
Lowndes	5,051	74.07%	1,766	25.90%	2	0.03%	-3,285	-48.17%	6,819
Macon	7,224	82.87%	1,481	16.99%	12	0.14%	-5,743	-65.88%	8,717
Madison	94,458	48.67%	99,181	51.10%	443	0.23%	4,723	2.43%	194,082
Marengo	5,687	52.36%	5,166	47.56%	9	0.08%	-521	-4.80%	10,862
Marion	1,847	13.42%	11,897	86.46%	16	0.12%	10,050	73.04%	13,760
Marshall	7,336	18.57%	32,086	81.22%	83	0.21%	24,750	62.65%	39,505
Mobile	86,034	47.10%	96,320	52.73%	315	0.17%	10,286	5.63%	182,669
Monroe	4,719	44.35%	5,906	55.50%	16	0.15%	1,187	11.15%	10,641
Montgomery	66,592	67.31%	32,221	32.57%	125	0.13%	-34,371	-34.74%	98,938
Morgan	15,108	28.24%	38,280	71.55%	111	0.21%	23,172	43.31%	53,499
Perry	3,943	75.58%	1,274	24.42%	0	0.00%	-2,669	-51.16%	5,217
Pickens	4,193	43.48%	5,439	56.40%	11	0.11%	1,246	12.92%	9,643
Pike	6,020	43.59%	7,777	56.31%	14	0.10%	1,757	12.72%	13,811
Randolph	2,362	21.93%	8,400	77.98%	10	0.09%	6,038	56.05%	10,772
Russell	11,853	55.77%	9,383	44.14%	19	0.09%	-2,470	-11.62%	21,255
Shelby	36,606	31.92%	77,836	67.87%	236	0.21%	41,230	35.95%	114,678
St. Clair	8,844	19.94%	35,426	79.89%	76	0.17%	26,582	59.94%	44,346
Sumter	4,705	75.18%	1,550	24.77%	3	0.05%	-3,155	-50.42%	6,258
Talladega	13,855	38.89%	21,726	60.99%	44	0.12%	7,871	22.09%	35,625
Tallapoosa	6,255	29.87%	14,668	70.04%	20	0.10%	8,413	40.17%	20,943
Tuscaloosa	40,404	44.92%	49,347	54.87%	190	0.21%	8,943	9.94%	89,941
Walker	5,978	19.25%	25,016	80.54%	65	0.21%	19,038	61.30%	31,059
Washington	2,635	29.92%	6,162	69.98%	9	0.10%	3,527	40.05%	8,806
Wilcox	4,095	69.65%	1,779	30.26%	5	0.09%	-2,316	-39.39%	5,879
Winston	1,302	11.59%	9,915	88.29%	13	0.12%	8,613	76.70%	11,230
Total	920,478	39.74%	1,392,076	60.10%	3,891	0.17%	471,598	20.36%	2,316,445

Counties that flipped from Democratic to Republican

- Barbour (largest city: Eufaula)
- Butler (largest city: Greenville)
- Chambers (largest city: Valley)
- Choctaw (largest town: Butler)
- Clarke (largest city: Jackson)
- Conecuh (largest city: Evergreen)
- Lee (largest city: Auburn)
- Madison (largest city: Huntsville)
- Mobile (largest city: Mobile)
- Pickens (largest city: Aliceville)
- Talladega (largest city: Talladega)
- Tuscaloosa (largest city: Tuscaloosa)

=== By congressional district ===
Tuberville won six of seven congressional districts.

District	Jones	Tuberville	Elected representative
1st	39%	61%	Jerry Carl
2nd	38%	62%	Barry Moore
3rd	36%	64%	Mike Rogers
4th	21%	79%	Robert Aderholt
5th	39%	60%	Mo Brooks
6th	35%	65%	Gary Palmer
7th	73%	27%	Terri Sewell

== Analysis ==
The result was a landslide victory for Tuberville. Tuberville's 20-point margin of victory is largely attributed to the presence of Donald Trump on the ballot, and Jones' votes against Brett Kavanaugh, Amy Coney Barrett, as well as his vote to convict Donald Trump in his first impeachment trial. Jones was widely considered the most vulnerable senator in 2020, and his victory in 2017 was largely attributed to allegations of child molestation against his opponent. While Jones was able to receive more raw votes than he did in 2017, Tuberville received nearly double the number of votes Roy Moore did in 2017, largely due to the high Republican turnout. Jones did perform well in Jefferson County and Montgomery County, but still vastly underperformed his margins in 2017, while Tuberville easily won the rural areas, and successfully flipped many counties that went to Jones by significant margins.

In the 2017 election, Jones won several traditionally Republican counties while also driving up margins and turnout in traditionally Democratic counties: he added onto massive margins in Birmingham and Montgomery with narrow wins in the state's other, previously more conservative metropolitan areas, such as Huntsville, Mobile, Tuscaloosa and Auburn-Opelika, alongside several other small counties encircling the Black Belt. Jones' win, though attributable to a spike in Democratic turnout and a decline in Republican turnout, was primarily reliant on sexual misconduct allegations against Moore, resulting in several prominent Republicans rescinding their endorsements. With Tuberville lacking such controversies, the state swung hard into the Republican column in 2020, and he flipped 12 counties Jones won in 2017. Jones only won the 13 counties won by Joe Biden in the concurrent 2020 presidential election, and his victories in Jefferson County (Birmingham) and Montgomery County (Montgomery) were insufficient to overcome Tuberville's performance in the rest of the state.

== Notes ==
Partisan clients and other notes

Voter samples
