= Victor Gaston =

American politician

Speaker of the Alabama House of Representatives Acting
- In office June 10, 2016 – August 15, 2016
- Preceded by: Mike Hubbard
- Succeeded by: Mac McCutcheon

Speaker pro tempore of the Alabama House of Representatives
- In office December 8, 2010 – January 10, 2023
- Preceded by: Demetrius Newton
- Succeeded by: Chris Pringle

Member of the Alabama House of Representatives from the 100th district
- In office November 3, 1982 – November 2022
- Preceded by: Thomas Sandusky
- Succeeded by: Mark Shirey

Personal details
- Born: Henry Victor Gaston; January 15, 1943 (age 83) Mobile, Alabama, U.S.
- Party: Republican
- Education: University of Southern; Mississippi (BS); University of South Alabama (MA); Auburn University (EdD)

Henry Victor Gaston (born January 15, 1943) is an American politician. He was the Acting Speaker of the Alabama House of Representatives.

== Early life ==
Victor Gaston was born on January 15, 1943. He received a B.S. from the University of Southern Mississippi, an M.A. from the University of South Alabama, and Ed.D. from Auburn University.

== Career ==
He worked as a school administrator and timber farmer.

=== Alabama House of Representatives ===
Gaston was first elected to represent the 100th district in the Alabama House of Representatives in 1982. He was elected by his colleagues to serve as Speaker Pro Tempore in December 2010 for a special session after the Republicans gained a majority during the 2010 mid-term elections. He was re-elected to full four-year terms in 2011 and 2015.

Gaston became the Acting Speaker of the Alabama House of House per state law and House rules after incumbent Speaker Mike Hubbard was convicted on 12 felony counts of public corruption. Alabama law requires any public office holder immediately removed from office if they have been convicted of a felony.

Gaston served as Acting Speaker until the full House reconvened to elect Mac McCutcheon as the permanent Speaker. With the chamber adjourned sine die for the rest of 2016, Gov. Robert J. Bentley would have to call a special session or the election of a permanent Speaker would have to wait until the House reconvenes in February 2017.

In June 2016, Gaston announced that he would seek the job of Speaker on a permanent basis.

=== Public service ===
He also sits on the Advisory Council for the Assistance League of Mobile, the American Legislative Exchange Council (ALEC), the State Building Commission, and the Southwest Alabama division of the National Mental Health Association. He is a member of Phi Delta Kappa, and a former member of the White House Commission on Presidential Scholars and the United States Energy Council. Additionally, he serves on the Boards of Volunteers of America, the Penelope House, Home of Grace for Women, Mobile Mental Health Center, the Mobile Association of Retarded Citizens, and Alabama 4-H Club Foundation.

== Personal life ==
He is widowed with two sons. He serves as a deacon at the Springhill Baptist Church in Mobile, Alabama, which was founded in 1949.

Alabama House of Representatives
Preceded by Demetrius Newton	Speaker pro tempore of the Alabama House of Representatives; 2010–2023	Succeeded by Chris Pringle
Political offices
Preceded by Mike Hubbard	Speaker of the Alabama House of Representatives; Acting; 2016	Succeeded by Mac McCutcheon
