= Nathaniel Ledbetter =

American politician

67th Speaker of the Alabama House of Representatives
- Incumbent
- Assumed office January 10, 2023
- Preceded by: Mac McCutcheon

Majority Leader of the Alabama House of Representatives
- In office March 1, 2017 – January 10, 2023
- Preceded by: Micky Hammon
- Succeeded by: Scott Stadthagen

Member of the Alabama House of Representatives from the 24th district
- Incumbent
- Assumed office November 5, 2014
- Preceded by: Todd Greeson

Personal details
- Born: Nathaniel David Ledbetter; May 17, 1961 (age 65) Somewhere in Alabama, U.S.
- Party: Democratic (before 2013); Republican (2013–present)
- Spouse: Teresa Wilks
- Children: 2 sons

Nathaniel Ledbetter (born c. 1961) is an American politician who has served as the Speaker of the Alabama House of Representatives since 2023. He represents Alabama's 24th House district, which includes parts of DeKalb County, since his election in 2014. He is a member of the Republican Party.

== Early political activities ==
At the age of 23, Nathaniel Ledbetter ran and won election as a member of the Rainsville City Council. Later on, he ran unopposed and was elected to serve as mayor of Rainsville until 2002. In the 2010 Elections he ran and was defeated as a member of the Democratic Party for State House District 24 before 4 years later running as a Republican and winning the same district. In March 2017, he succeeded Micky Hammon as the majority leader in the House of Representatives. Ledbetter was elected Speaker of the House in January 2023, succeeding Mac McCutcheon.

== Education ==
Ledbetter is a graduate from Plainview High School located in Rainsville, Alabama.

== Political positions ==
Ledbetter has said some of his proudest accomplishments were improving the quality of life for area citizens through local projects, and creating jobs for the people in District 24.

On May 8, 2026, in a press conference following Alabama GOP legislators passing trigger law bills to enact district maps from 2023, Ledbetter stated he hoped the courts would "overturn Amendment 14".

== Personal life ==
Ledbetter worked for Sand Mountain Electric Cooperative until his retirement. He and his wife, Teresa, live in Rainsville and attend Broadway Baptist Church. Together they have two children, Nathan and Nick.

Alabama House of Representatives
Preceded by Micky Hammon	Majority Leader of the Alabama House of Representatives; 2017–2023	Succeeded by Scott Stadthagen
Political offices
Preceded by Mac McCutcheon	Speaker of the Alabama House of Representatives; 2023–present	Incumbent
