= Angelo Mancuso (American politician) =

American physician

Angelo Mancuso is an American politician and dermatological surgeon.

Mancuso held the fourth district seat in the Alabama House of Representatives from 1999 to 2003 as a Democrat. He contested the Democratic party primary for Alabama's 3rd Senate district in 2006. In 2008, Mancuso switched parties, to run in the Republican primary for Alabama's 5th congressional district, in which he finished third. Mancuso considered running for the lieutenant governorship in 2013, after hearing that an International Paper mill in Courtland planned to close with inadequate responses by state politicians. The next year, Mancuso contested the general election for Alabama's 4th Senate district as a Democrat, losing to Paul Bussman.

Outside of politics, Mancuso is a dermatological surgeon.
