= Nelson Papucci =

American hypnotist and politician

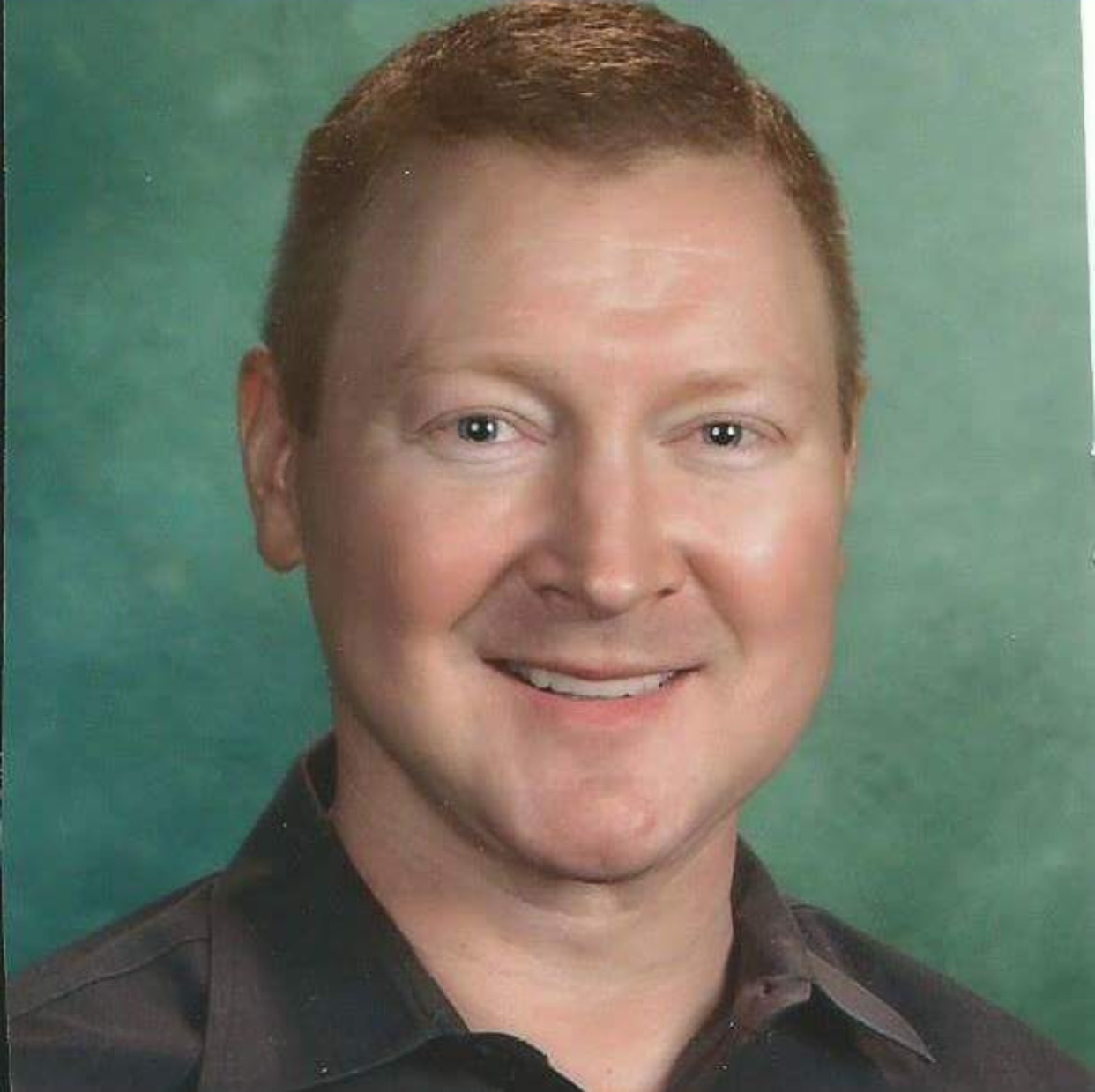
Papucci in 2019

Nelson Papucci III (born March 1, 1968) is an American hypnotist, author, educator, and retired politician. He was a Republican member of the Alabama House of Representatives from Madison County between 1994 and 1998.

After retiring from politics, Papucci authored The San Diego Padres, 1969-2002: A Complete History, which chronicled the early years of the franchise.

Currently, Papucci is a professional hypnotist, performing comedy stage performances throughout the country. He also teaches mathematics and holds a real estate broker license.
