= 2013 Alabama's 1st congressional district special election =

- December 17, 2013

Alabama's 1st congressional district
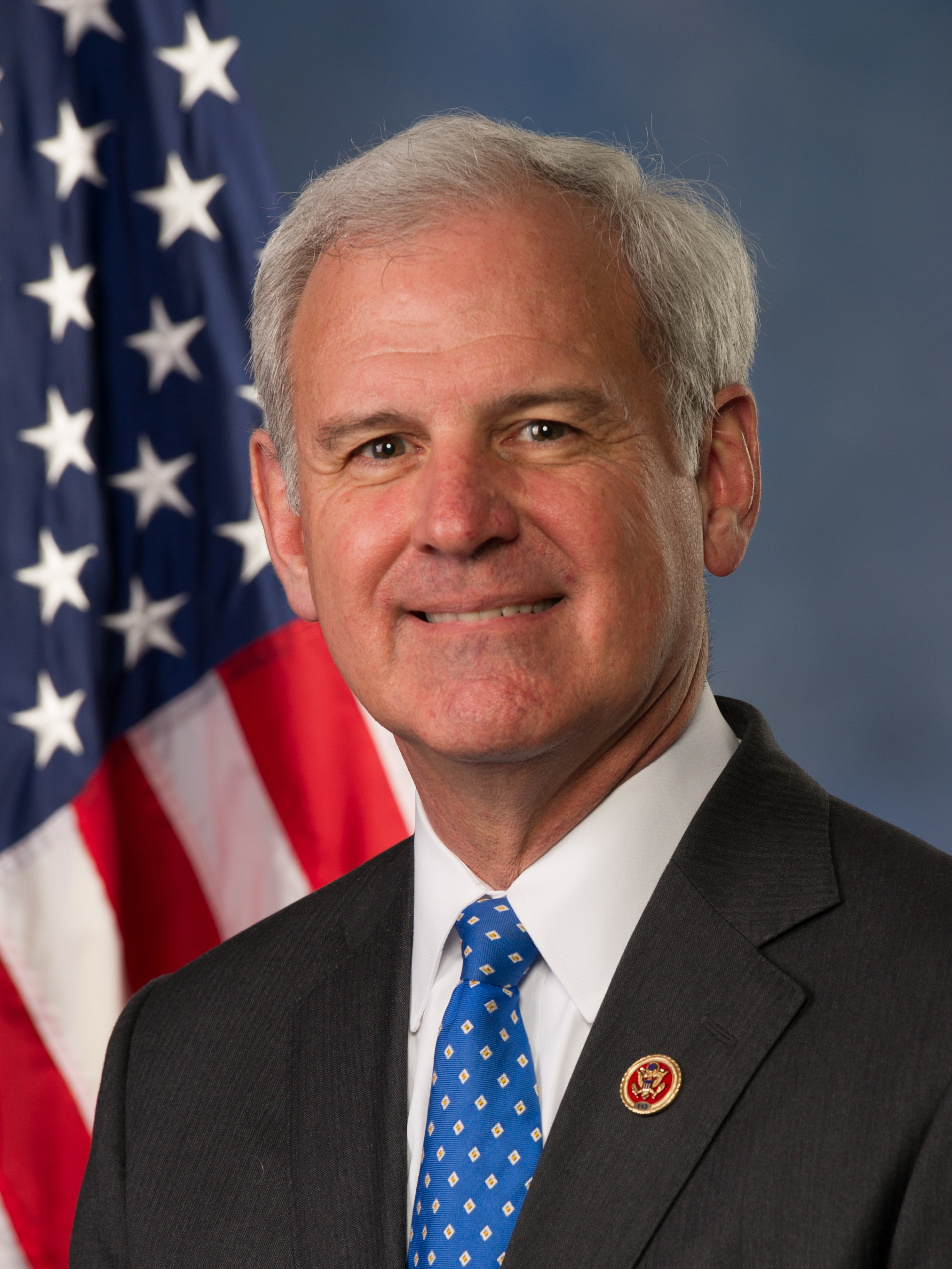

Nominee	Bradley Byrne	Burton LeFlore
Party	Republican	Democratic
Popular vote	36,071	14,985
Percentage	70.17%	29.32%
U.S. Representative before election
Jo Bonner
Republican
Elected U.S. Representative
Bradley Byrne
Republican

A special election for Alabama's 1st congressional district was held following the resignation of Jo Bonner on August 2, 2013, to become vice chancellor for the University of Alabama. Primary elections were held on September 24. A runoff in the Republican primary took place on November 5 and the general election was pushed back to December 17. Republican Bradley Byrne won the election by a wide margin in the strongly conservative district.

== Republican primary ==
=== Candidates ===
==== Declared ====
- Bradley Byrne, former state senator and candidate for Governor of Alabama in 2010
- Daniel Dyas, builder
- Chad Fincher, state representative
- Wells Griffith, former RNC deputy chief of staff
- Quin Hillyer, newspaper columnist
- Jessica James, real estate agent, candidate for the Alabama State Board of Education in 2012 and candidate for the Tuscaloosa City Council in 2005
- Sharon Powe, entrepreneur, legal assistant for the U.S. Small Business Administration and candidate for the Alabama House of Representatives in 2010
- David Thornton, retired Shell production specialist and retail employee
- Dean Young, businessman and candidate for the seat in 2012

==== Declined ====
- Jim Barton, state representative
- Randy Brinson, political activist and gastroenterologist
- Ben Brooks, Mobile County Circuit Judge and former state senator
- Greg Callahan
- Sam Cochran, Mobile County Sheriff
- Jeff Collier, Mayor of Dauphin Island
- Robert Craft, Mayor of Gulf Shores
- Randy Davis, state representative
- Tucker Dorsey, Baldwin County Commissioner
- Victor Gaston, state representative
- Rusty Glover, state senator
- Peter Gounares, real estate agent and candidate for the seat in 2010 and 2012
- Bill Hightower, state senator
- Connie Hudson, Mobile County Commissioner
- Tim Kant, Mayor of Fairhope
- Tony Kennon, Orange Beach Mayor
- Albert Lipscomb, former Baldwin County Commissioner
- Hoss Mack, Baldwin County Sheriff
- Stephen Nodine, former Mobile County Commissioner and Baldwin County Jail inmate
- Trip Pittman, state senator
- Ashley Rich, Mobile District Attorney
- Pete Riehm, real estate agent and candidate for the seat in 2012
- Tim Russell, Baldwin County Probate Judge
- Sandy Stimpson, Mobile Mayor-Elect
- Robert Wilters, Baldwin County Circuit Judge

=== Endorsements ===
Wells Griffith
- Paul Ryan, U.S. Representative and nominee for Vice President of the United States in 2012
Quin Hillyer
- Rick Santorum, U.S. Senator and candidate for President of the United States in 2012

=== Polling ===
Poll source	Date(s) administered	Sample size	Margin of error	Bradley Byrne	Daniel Dyas	Chad Fincher	Wells Griffith	Quin Hillyer	Jessica James	Sharon Powe	David Thornton	Dean Young	Undecided
Cygnal	September 17–18, 2013	716	± 3.64%	34%	2%	14.9%	8.3%	9.1%	0.7%	1.1%	0.3%	12.1%	17.5%

=== Results ===
Republican primary results
Party	Candidate	Votes	%
Republican	Bradley Byrne	18,090	34.57%
Republican	Dean Young	12,011	22.95%
Republican	Chad Fincher	8,177	15.63%
Republican	Quin Hillyer	7,260	13.87%
Republican	Wells Griffith	5,758	11.00%
Republican	Daniel Dyas	391	0.75%
Republican	Jessica James	391	0.75%
Republican	Sharon Powe	184	0.35%
Republican	David Thornton	72	0.14%
Total votes		52,344	100.00%

=== Runoff ===
==== Polling ====
Poll source	Date(s) administered	Sample size	Margin of error	Bradley Byrne	Dean Young	Other	Undecided
Cygnal	October 30, 2013	1,027	± 3.03%	40.2%	43.2%	—	16.6%
Wenzel Strategies	October 6–8, 2013	412	± ?%	44%	37%	—	19%

=== Results ===
Republican primary runoff results
Party	Candidate	Votes	%
Republican	Bradley Byrne	38,150	52.5%
Republican	Dean Young	34,534	47.5%
Total votes		72,684	100.00%

== Democratic primary ==
=== Candidates ===
==== Declared ====
- Lula Albert-Kaigler, retired self-employed worker
- Burton LeFlore, real estate agent

==== Declined ====
- Regina Benjamin, Surgeon General of the United States
- Napoleon Bracy, State Representative
- Lucy Buffett, businesswoman
- Vivian Davis Figures, state senator
- Sam Jones, Mayor of Mobile
- Marc Keahey, state senator

=== Results ===
Democratic primary results
Party	Candidate	Votes	%
Democratic	Burton LeFlore	3,129	70.2%
Democratic	Lula Albert-Kaigler	1,328	29.8%
Total votes		4,457	100.00%

== Independent ==
=== Candidates ===
==== Declared ====
- James Hall, former Marine

== General election ==
=== Results ===
2013 Alabama's 1st congressional district special election
Party	Candidate	Votes	%
Republican	Bradley Byrne	36,071	70.17%
Democratic	Burton LeFlore	14,985	29.32%
Write-ins	Write-ins	350	0.68%
Total votes		51,406	100.0%
Republican hold			

==== By county ====
County	Bradley Byrne Republican		Burton LeFlore Democratic		Write-in Various		Margin		Total
County	#	%	#	%	#	%	#	%	Total
Baldwin	13,048	82.2%	2,668	16.8%	155	1.0%	10,380	65.4%	15,871
Clarke (part)	594	72.7%	221	27.1%	2	0.2%	373	45.6%	817
Escambia	1,659	74.9%	537	24.2%	20	0.9%	1,122	50.7%	2,216
Mobile	18,651	64.2%	10,190	35.3%	154	0.5%	8,371	28.9%	28,905
Monroe	1,230	61.6%	751	37.6%	16	0.8%	479	24.0%	1,997
Washington	979	61.2%	618	38.6%	3	0.2%	361	22.6%	1,600
Totals	36,071	70.17%	14,985	29.15%	350	0.68%	21,086	41.02%	51,046
