= Mikhail Torrance =

American basketball player (1988–2026

Personal information
- Born: September 30, 1988 Eight Mile, Alabama, U.S.
- Died: June 18, 2026 (aged 37)
- Listed height: 6 ft 5 in (1.96 m)
- Listed weight: 210 lb (95 kg)

Career information
- High school: Mary G. Montgomery (Semmes, Alabama)
- College: Alabama (2006–2010)
- NBA draft: 2010: undrafted
- Playing career: 2010–2015
- Positions: Point guard, shooting guard

Career history
- 2011: OGM Ormanspor
- 2012: Bay Area Matrix
- 2012–2013: Moncton Miracles
- 2013: Salon Vilpas Vikings
- 2014: Cañeros del Este
- 2015: Frayles de Guasave

Career highlights
- Second-team All-SEC (2010)

Mikhail Renard Torrance (September 30, 1988 – June 18, 2026) was an American professional basketball player. He played college basketball for the Alabama Crimson Tide before playing professionally in Turkey, Canada, Finland, the Dominican Republic, and Mexico.

== High school career ==
Torrance graduated from Mary G. Montgomery High School in Semmes, Alabama. He averaged 22 points, eight assists, and seven rebounds as a senior and earned First-Team All-State selection in 2005 and 2006.

== College career ==
Torrance played four years of college basketball for the Alabama Crimson Tide between 2006 and 2010.

As a freshman in 2006–07, Torrance played in 21 of Alabama's 32 games and averaged 3.0 points and 1.0 rebounds per game.

As a sophomore in 2007–08, Torrance played in 30 of 33 games and made in three starts, averaging 3.3 points and 2.4 assists per game.

As a junior in 2008–09, Torrance played 28 games and made 15 starts, averaging 10.0 points, 2.3 rebounds, and 2.3 assists per game. He twice scored a career-high 24 points during the season.

As a senior in 2009–10, Torrance played 32 games and made 28 starts, averaging 15.6 points, 3.7 rebounds, and 5.1 assists per game. He was named second-team All-SEC.

== Professional career ==
Torrance went undrafted in the 2010 NBA draft. There were reportedly concerns over a heart ailment that underwent scrutiny during NBA pre-draft workouts. He played for the Miami Heat during the 2010 NBA Summer League.

He was set to play for Maccabi Tel Aviv B.C. of the Israeli Basketball Premier League in the 2010–11 season, but in August 2010, he collapsed during a workout in Florida. His brain was deprived of oxygen for at least 10 minutes, and he was subsequently placed on life support in intensive care for two weeks.

In November 2011, Torrance joined OGM Ormanspor of the Turkish Basketball Second League. He left in December 2011 after averaging 10.1 points, 2.9 rebounds, and 2.6 assists in 12 games. In January 2012, he joined the Bay Area Matrix of the American Basketball Association.

Torrance played for the Moncton Miracles of the NBL Canada during the 2012–13 season.

He started the 2013–14 season with Salon Vilpas Vikings in Finland but left in October 2013 after seven games. He then had a two-game stint with Cañeros del Este in the Dominican Republic in 2014.

Torrance played for Frayles de Guasave of the Mexican CIBACOPA during the 2015 season.

== Personal life and death ==
Torrance was born on September 30, 1988, the son of Michael and Leola Torrance. He died on June 18, 2026, at the age of 37.
