= 2026 Alabama Commissioner of Agriculture and Industries election =

- November 3, 2026
Candidate	Corey Hill	Ron Sparks
Party	Republican	Democratic
Popular vote	901,282	764,396
Percentage	54.1%	45.9%
- Hill: 50–60% 60–70% 70–80% 80–90% Sparks: 50–60% 60–70% 70–80% 80–90%
Commissioner before election
Rick Pate
Republican
Elected Commissioner
Corey Hill
Republican

The 2026 Alabama Commissioner of Agriculture and Industries election was held on November 3, 2026, to elect the Alabama Commissioner of Agriculture and Industries. The primary election was held on May 19. Two-term incumbent Rick Pate was term-limited and ineligible to run for re-election.

== Republican primary ==
=== Candidates ===
==== Nominee ====
- Corey Hill, mayor of Douglas

==== Eliminated in runoff ====
- Christina Woerner McInnis, farmer and businesswoman

==== Eliminated in primary ====
- Jack Williams, state senator from the 34th district (2018–present)

=== Endorsements ===
Corey Hill

Organizations

- Alabama Farmers Federation
Christina Woerner McInnis

Organizations

- Alabama Associated General Contractors
Jack Williams

Organizations

- Alabama Forestry Association
- Alabama Realtors PAC
- Business Council of Alabama
- Manufacture Alabama

=== Fundraising ===
In the first month of fundraising, McInnis raised over $100,000, more than what other candidates had reported.

Campaign finance reports as of May 18, 2026
Candidate	Raised	Other receipts	Spent	Cash on hand
Corey Hill (R)	$335,035	$40,000	$279,619	$95,415
Christina Woerner McInnis (R)	$359,962	$525,000	$746,691	$105,721
Jack Williams (R)	$645,602	$250,683	$687,409	$208,876
Source: Alabama FCPA

=== Polling ===
Poll source	Date(s) administered	Sample size (Note: Key: A – all adults RV – registered voters LV – likely voters V – unclear)	Margin of error	Corey Hill	Christina Woerner McInnis	Jack Williams	Undecided
The Alabama Poll	March 22–24, 2026	600 (LV)	± 4.0%	7%	9%	8%	75%
The Alabama Poll	December 15, 2025	600 (LV)	± 4.0%	6%	5%	10%	79%
The Alabama Poll	August 24–26, 2025	600 (LV)	± 4.0%	6%	7%	10%	77%

=== Debates and forums ===
2026 Alabama Commissioner of Agriculture and Industries Republican primary debates and forums
No.	Date	Host	Moderator	Link	Republican	Republican	Republican
Key: P Participant A Absent N Not invited I Invited W Withdrawn							
Key: P Participant A Absent N Not invited I Invited W Withdrawn					Hill	McInnis	Williams
1	January 15, 2026	Auburn University Department of Agriculture	Mykel Taylor	N/A	P	P	P
2	April 9, 2026	Eastern Shore Republican Women	N/A	Rumble	P	P	A

=== Results ===
Primary results by county: Hill: 30–40%; 40–50%; 50–60%; 60–70%; McInnis: 30–40%; 40–50%; 60–70%; Williams: 30–40%; 40–50%; 50–60%

Republican primary
Party	Candidate	Votes	%
Republican	Corey Hill	150,598	35.2
Republican	Christina Woerner McInnis	149,179	34.9
Republican	Jack Williams	128,112	29.9
Total votes		427,889	100.0

=== Runoff ===
==== Fundraising ====
Campaign finance reports as of June 15, 2026
Candidate	Raised	Other receipts	Spent	Cash on hand
Corey Hill (R)	$535,005	$40,000	$527,816	$47,188
Christina Woerner McInnis (R)	$476,522	$762,550	$1,171,851	$34,671
Source: Alabama FCPA

==== Polling ====
Poll source	Date(s) administered	Sample size	Margin of error	Corey Hill	Christina Woerner McInnis	Undecided
The Alabama Poll	May 28, 2026	600 (LV)	± 4.0%	33%	27%	40%

==== Results ====
Runoff results by county: Hill: 50–60%; 60–70%; 70–80%; McInnis: 50–60%; 60–70%; 70–80%

Republican primary runoff
Party	Candidate	Votes	%
Republican	Corey Hill	158,033	53.3
Republican	Christina Woerner McInnis	138,468	46.7
Total votes		296,501	100.0

== Democratic primary ==
=== Candidates ===
==== Nominee ====
- Ron Sparks, former commissioner (2003–2011) and nominee for governor in 2010

==== Did not file ====
- Deidra Willis, businesswoman and candidate for Alabama Senate in 2018

=== Endorsements ===
Deidra Willis (did not file)

Organizations

- Alabama Cannabis Coalition

=== Fundraising ===
Campaign finance reports as of May 18, 2026
Candidate	Raised	Other receipts	Spent	Cash on hand
Ron Sparks (D)	$102,051	$5,000	$9,460	$97,590
Source: Alabama FCPA

== General election ==
=== Endorsements ===
Ron Sparks (D)

Statewide officials

- Troy King, former attorney general of Alabama (2004–2011) (Republican)

Labor unions

- Alabama AFL-CIO
- United Mine Workers of America COMPAC

Organizations

- VoteVets

=== Fundraising ===
Campaign finance reports as of November 2, 2026
Candidate	Raised	Other receipts	Spent	Cash on hand
Corey Hill (R)	$793,750	$100,000	$766,107	$127,642
Ron Sparks (D)	$286,640	$5,000	$280,873	$10,766
Source: Alabama FCPA

=== Polling ===
Poll source	Date(s) administered	Sample size	Margin of error	Corey Hill (R)	Ron Sparks (D)	Undecided
Cygnal (R) (Note: Poll conducted for Alabama Daily News and Gray Media Alabama)	October 16–17, 2026	500 (LV)	± 4.4%	49%	36%	16%

=== Results ===
2026 Alabama Commissioner of Agriculture and Industries election election
Party	Candidate	Votes	%
Republican	Corey Hill	901,282	54.08
Democratic	Ron Sparks	764,396	45.87
Write-in		881	0.05
Total votes		1,666,559	100.00
