= Rusty Glover =

American politician

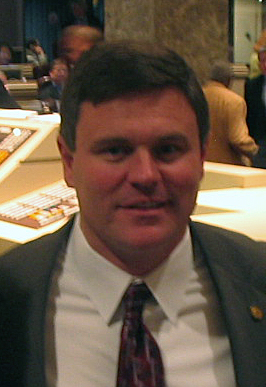
- Glover in 2006

Member of the Alabama Senate from the 34th district
- In office November 7, 2006 – November 6, 2018
- Preceded by: Hank "Hap" Myers
- Succeeded by: Jack W. Williams

Member of the Alabama House of Representatives from the 102nd district
- In office November 6, 2002 – November 7, 2006
- Preceded by: J.E. Turner
- Succeeded by: Chad Fincher

Personal details
- Born: April 17, 1966 (age 60) Mobile, Alabama, U.S.
- Party: Republican
- Spouse: Connie Glover
- Education: University of South Alabama (BS, MA, M.Ed)

Rusty Glover (born April 17, 1966) is an American politician and former teacher who was a member of the Alabama Senate, representing the 34th district from 2006 to 2018. Previously, he was a member of the Alabama House of Representatives, representing the 102nd district from 2002 to 2006. He ran as a Republican candidate for Lieutenant Governor of Alabama in the 2018 election cycle, as well as for State Auditor of Alabama in 2022.

In 2026, Glover launched a campaign to reclaim his old seat in the Alabama Senate; he won the Republican primary for the 34th district and is unopposed in the general election.

== Early life and career ==
Glover was born in Mobile, Alabama, on April 17, 1966. He attended B.C. Rain High School in Mobile. After graduation, he studied at Faulkner State Community College, where he earned an associate's degree. He then attended the University of South Alabama, where he attained a BSc. in secondary education, an M.A. in history, and a M.Ed. in secondary education.

Glover taught history at Mary G. Montgomery High School in Semmes, Alabama, for 25 years, in addition to coaching baseball and football there.

== Political career ==
Glover was elected to the Alabama House of Representatives in 2002 and served one term, representing the 102nd district. Glover ran a brief campaign for Alabama's 1st congressional district that year, in a Republican primary eventually won by Jo Bonner, before being elected to the Alabama House of Representatives instead.

Glover was first elected to the Alabama State Senate in 2006, and served three terms, representing the 34th district. The Montgomery Advertiser wrote that he "rarely faced serious opposition in his campaigns." He took on the leadership role of Majority Whip by 2016.

While serving in the state legislature, Glover supported the end of Common Core in schools, and sponsored legislation enacting higher penalties for those found guilty of driving under the influence, which later became law. In 2017, Glover proposed an appointment system for vacancies in the Alabama state government, thereby reducing the number of special elections. It passed in a 2018 amendment vote with 60% support.

In February 2017, Glover announced that he would be running for Lieutenant Governor of Alabama in 2018; he was the first candidate to launch a campaign for that position. Glover was one of three candidates in the race, and finished in third, missing the runoff with 19.6% of the vote.

Glover ran for State Auditor of Alabama in the 2022 election cycle, announcing his campaign in July 2021. Glover finished in third place out of three candidates, missing the runoff with 27.7% of the vote.

In 2026, Glover's initial successor in the Alabama Senate's 34th district, Jack W. Williams, retired to run in the election for state Commissioner of Agriculture and Industries. Glover ran in the Republican primary for the 34th district that year, seeking to return to the state senate. He received an early endorsement from the Alabama Farmers Federation. His opponent in the primary was Doug Harwell, who received support from a political action committee favorable to sports betting. The involvement of the gambling industry in the primary was profiled in a Bloomberg News article, which reported that over $2.2 million had been spent by sports betting PACs to attack Glover. In March 2026, Glover claimed that Harwell's campaign had released a push poll attacking him with "false claims about his record". In the May primary election, Glover defeated Harwell for the Republican nomination with approximately 54% of the vote, and was unopposed in the general election. After his victory in the primary, Glover said he would focus on "infrastructural needs" in the district.

== Personal life ==
Glover lives in Semmes, Alabama, with his wife, Connie. The couple have two daughters. Glover attends the Wilmer Baptist Church in Wilmer, Alabama. He is also a member of The Gideons International and the National Rifle Association of America.
