= Chad Fincher =

American politician from Semmes, Alabama

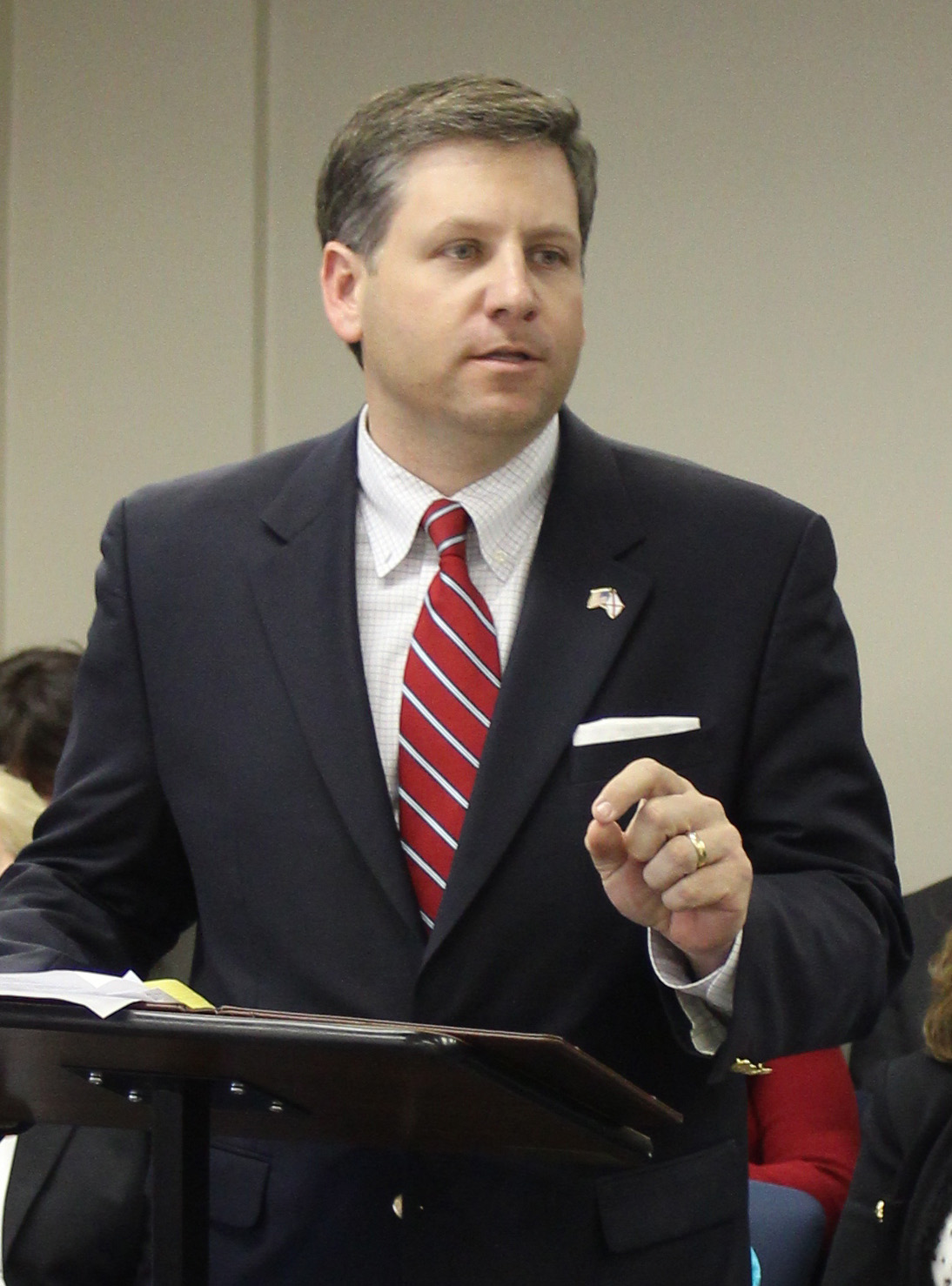

Member of the Alabama House of Representatives from the 102nd district
- In office November 2006 – November 2014
- Preceded by: Rusty Glover
- Succeeded by: Jack W. Williams

Personal details
- Born: 1974 (age 51–52) Mobile County, Alabama, U.S.
- Party: Republican
- Spouse: Caresse Fincher
- Education: Auburn University
- Profession: Real estate broker

Chad Austin Fincher (born 1974) is an American politician from Semmes, Alabama. He served as a member of the Alabama State House of Representatives from 2006 until 2014.

== Biography ==
Fincher, born in Mobile County, Alabama, is a graduate of Auburn University with Bachelor of Science in Forestry Operations, and is a registered Forester with the State of Alabama.

He is currently the Owner of Fincher and Associates Realty, and is a licensed Realtor in the states of Alabama and Mississippi. He has practiced real estate for over 15 years.

== Legislative history ==
Fincher currently serves as chairman on the House Agriculture and Forestry Committee. Other committees Fincher serves on include:

- House Ways and Means Committee
- Mobile County Delegation Committee
- Water Policy and Management Joint Legislative Committee
- Joint Legislative Committee on State Parks
- Housing Finance Authority Legislative Oversight Committee
- Permanent Joint Legislative Committee on Energy Policy
- Southern Legislative Conferences Agriculture and Rural Development Committee
- Southern Regional Education Board Legislative Advisory Council

=== Education reform ===
In the 2013 Legislative Session, Fincher sponsored the School Flexibility Act, now known (after a controversial rewrite to encompass private school vouchers) as the Alabama Accountability Act, which established flexibility contracts between the State Board of Education and local school districts, and establishes a scholarship program for children in failing schools as well as taxpayer funds for private schools.

== 2013 congressional campaign ==
Fincher ran in a 2013 special election to represent Alabama's 1st congressional district in the United States House of Representatives, following Jo Bonner's retirement. Fincher finished third in the Republican primary, behind Bradley Byrne and Dean Young. In his concession speech he described himself as a social and fiscal conservative.
