= Senator Lipscomb =

Senator Lipscomb may refer to:

- Albert Lipscomb (born 1951), Alabama State Senate
- Mark Lipscomb Jr. (born 1935), Wisconsin State Senate
