= Christina Woerner McInnis =

American farmer and businesswoman

Christina McInnis

Personal details
- Party: Republican
- Spouse: Timothy Neal
- Children: 4
- Education: Auburn University (BA)
- Website: Campaign website

Christina Woerner McInnis is an American farmer and businesswoman. She is best known for founding AgriTech Corporation, and introducing SoilKit, a soil testing product for farmers.

== Early life and education ==
McInnis grew up on Woerner Farms, a family farm established in 1908. She is a fifth-generation farmer. She graduated from Auburn University, where she received a degree in business.

== Career ==
McInnis worked for Woerner Farms as the head of marketing and sales. She worked with farmers in Cuba, discussing agricultural practices.

In 2019, she founded AgriTech Corporation, and introduced SoilKit. The product is described as simplifying soil testing, and providing the necessary supplies to take a sample. She worked with Auburn University to increase the product availability. She earned a supplier development marketing package and a $5,000 grant through a Lowe's web-based reality program.

In March 2025, she announced that she would run in the 2026 Alabama Commissioner of Agriculture and Industries election. She is running for the Republican Party.

== Personal life ==
McInnis is married to Timothy Neal McInnis II, and lives in Orange Beach, Alabama.
