= Alabama's 32nd Senate district =

Alabama's 32nd State Senate district
Senator
| Chris Elliott; R–Daphne |
- Demographics: 82.9% White; 7.6% Black; 4.9% Hispanic; 1.2% Asian
- Population (2022): 149,768

Alabama's 32nd Senate district is one of 35 districts in the Alabama Senate. The district has been represented by Chris Elliott since 2018.

== Geography ==
| Election | Map | Counties in District |
|---|---|---|
| 2026; 2022 | | Portion of Baldwin |
| 2018 | | Portion of Baldwin |
| 2014 | | Portion of Baldwin |
| 2010; 2006; 2002 | | Portion of Baldwin |

== Election history ==
=== Elections in the 2020s ===
Alabama Senate election, 2022: Senate District 32
| Party | Candidate | Votes | % | ±% |
|---|---|---|---|---|
| Republican | Chris Elliott (Incumbent) | 41,073 | 98.16 | +23.19 |
| Write-in | | 768 | 1.84 | +1.70 |
| Majority | | 40,305 | 96.33 | +46.28 |
| Turnout | | 41,841 | | |
| Republican hold | | | | |

=== Elections in the 2010s ===
Alabama Senate election, 2018: Senate District 32
| Party | Candidate | Votes | % | ±% |
|---|---|---|---|---|
| Republican | Chris Elliott | 45,726 | 74.95 | −6.45 |
| Democratic | Jason E. Fisher | 15,193 | 24.90 | +24.90 |
| Write-in | | 86 | 0.14 | -0.02 |
| Majority | | 30,533 | 50.05 | −12.91 |
| Turnout | | 61,005 | | |
| Republican hold | | | | |

Alabama Senate election, 2014: Senate District 32
| Party | Candidate | Votes | % | ±% |
|---|---|---|---|---|
| Republican | Trip Pittman (Incumbent) | 27,837 | 81.40 | −17.44 |
| Independent | Kimberly McCuiston | 6,306 | 18.44 | +18.44 |
| Write-in | | 55 | 0.16 | -1.00 |
| Majority | | 21,531 | 62.96 | −34.72 |
| Turnout | | 34,198 | | |
| Republican hold | | | | |

Alabama Senate election, 2010: Senate District 32
| Party | Candidate | Votes | % | ±% |
|---|---|---|---|---|
| Republican | Trip Pittman (Incumbent) | 42,365 | 98.84 | +12.46 |
| Write-in | | 497 | 1.16 | +0.77 |
| Majority | | 41,868 | 97.68 | +24.51 |
| Turnout | | 42,862 | | |
| Republican hold | | | | |

=== Elections in the 2000s ===
Alabama Senate District 32 special election - 16 October 2007
| Party | Candidate | Votes | % | ±% |
|---|---|---|---|---|
| Republican | Trip Pittman | 12,745 | 86.38 | −12.52 |
| Democratic | A. J. Cooper | 1,950 | 13.21 | +13.21 |
| Write-in | | 58 | 0.39 | -0.71 |
| Majority | | 10,795 | 73.17 | −24.63 |
| Turnout | | 14,753 | | |
| Republican hold | | | | |

Alabama Senate election, 2006: Senate District 32
| Party | Candidate | Votes | % | ±% |
|---|---|---|---|---|
| Republican | Bradley Byrne (Incumbent) | 32,670 | 98.90 | +8.97 |
| Write-in | | 364 | 1.10 | +0.45 |
| Majority | | 32,306 | 97.80 | +17.29 |
| Turnout | | 33,034 | | |
| Republican hold | | | | |

Alabama Senate election, 2002: Senate District 32
| Party | Candidate | Votes | % | ±% |
|---|---|---|---|---|
| Republican | Bradley Byrne | 32,743 | 89.93 | +21.58 |
| Libertarian | Richard Medicus | 3,431 | 9.42 | +9.42 |
| Write-in | | 235 | 0.65 | +0.53 |
| Majority | | 29,312 | 80.51 | +49.69 |
| Turnout | | 36,409 | | |
| Republican hold | | | | |

=== Elections in the 1990s ===
Alabama Senate election, 1998: Senate District 32
| Party | Candidate | Votes | % | ±% |
|---|---|---|---|---|
| Republican | Albert Lipscomb (Incumbent) | 29,577 | 68.35 | −0.81 |
| Democratic | Richard Jensen | 13,643 | 31.53 | +0.79 |
| Write-in | | 52 | 0.12 | +0.02 |
| Majority | | 15,934 | 36.82 | −1.60 |
| Turnout | | 43,272 | | |
| Republican hold | | | | |

Alabama Senate election, 1994: Senate District 32
| Party | Candidate | Votes | % | ±% |
|---|---|---|---|---|
| Republican | Albert Lipscomb (Incumbent) | 25,770 | 69.16 | +15.09 |
| Democratic | D. Koontz | 11,453 | 30.74 | −15.19 |
| Write-in | | 39 | 0.10 | +0.10 |
| Majority | | 14,317 | 38.42 | +30.28 |
| Turnout | | 37,262 | | |
| Republican hold | | | | |

Alabama Senate election, 1990: Senate District 32
| Party | Candidate | Votes | % | ±% |
|---|---|---|---|---|
| Republican | Albert Lipscomb (Incumbent) | 20,468 | 54.07 | +3.04 |
| Democratic | Lyle Underwood | 17,387 | 45.93 | −3.04 |
| Majority | | 3,081 | 8.14 | +6.08 |
| Turnout | | 37,855 | | |
| Republican hold | | | | |

=== Elections in the 1980s ===
1990 Alabama Senate District 32 special election - 8 August 1989
| Party | Candidate | Votes | % | ±% |
|---|---|---|---|---|
| Republican | Albert Lipscomb | 7,914 | 51.03 | −11.17 |
| Democratic | Lyle Underwood | 7,595 | 48.97 | +11.17 |
| Majority | | 319 | 2.06 | −22.34 |
| Turnout | | 15,509 | | |
| Republican hold | | | | |

Alabama Senate election, 1986: Senate District 32
| Party | Candidate | Votes | % | ±% |
|---|---|---|---|---|
| Republican | Perry Hand (Incumbent) | 23,889 | 62.20 | +18.07 |
| Democratic | Robert I. Gulledge | 14,518 | 37.80 | +10.88 |
| Majority | | 9,371 | 24.40 | +9.22 |
| Turnout | | 38,407 | | |
| Republican hold | | | | |

Alabama Senate election, 1983: Senate District 32
| Party | Candidate | Votes | % | ±% |
|---|---|---|---|---|
| Republican | Perry Hand | 7,541 | 44.13 | −0.19 |
| Independent | Jerry Boyington (Incumbent) | 4,947 | 28.95 | +28.95 |
| Democratic | L. D. Owen Jr. | 4,599 | 26.92 | −28.76 |
| Majority | | 2,594 | 15.18 | +3.82 |
| Turnout | | 17,087 | | |
| Republican gain from Democratic | | | | |

Alabama Senate election, 1982: Senate District 32
| Party | Candidate | Votes | % | ±% |
|---|---|---|---|---|
| Democratic | Jerry Boyington | 16,519 | 55.68 | |
| Republican | Perry Hand | 13,149 | 44.32 | |
| Majority | | 3,370 | 11.36 | |
| Turnout | | 29,668 | | |
| Democratic hold | | | | |

== District officeholders ==
Senators take office at midnight on the day of their election.

- Chris Elliott (2018–present)
- Trip Pittman (2007–2018)
- Bradley Byrne (2002–2007)
- Albert Lipscomb (1989–2002)
- Perry Hand (1983–1989)
- Jerry Boyington (1982–1983)
- Robert I. Gulledge (1978–1982)
- L. D. Owen Jr. (1974–1978)

Not in use 1966–1974.

- Charles A. Montgomery (1962–1966)
- W. F. Wilson (1958–1962)
- James S. Coleman (1954–1958)
