= Sonny Callahan =

American politician (1932–2021)

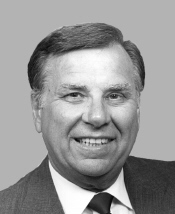

Member of the U.S. House of Representatives from Alabama's 1st district
- In office January 3, 1985 – January 3, 2003
- Preceded by: Jack Edwards
- Succeeded by: Jo Bonner

Member of the Alabama Senate from the 34th district
- In office 1978–1982
- Preceded by: Lionel Noonan Sr.
- Succeeded by: Ann Bedsole

Member of the Alabama House of Representatives
- In office 1970–1978
- Succeeded by: Ann Bedsole

Personal details
- Born: Herbert Leon Callahan; September 11, 1932 Mobile, Alabama, U.S.
- Died: June 25, 2021 (aged 88)
- Party: Democratic (before 1982); Republican (1982–2021)
- Spouse: Karen Reed
- Children: 6

Military service
- Branch/service: United States Navy

Herbert Leon "Sonny" Callahan (September 11, 1932 – June 25, 2021) was an American businessman and politician from Alabama. After being elected as a Democrat from Mobile to the state house and senate, he shifted to the Republican Party after losing a race for Lieutenant Governor of Alabama in 1982. He was repeatedly elected as a Republican to the United States House of Representatives, serving from 1985 to 2003. Afterward he established his own lobbying firm and continued to be active in the Republican Party.

== Early life and education ==
Callahan was born in Mobile, Alabama, in 1932 to a large Irish Catholic family. He had eight brothers and sisters. After attending public schools, he attended classes at the University of Alabama, Mobile campus. He left college before graduation, serving in the United States Navy from 1952 to 1954.

== Work and politics ==
Afterward Callahan returned to Mobile, where he started work in the trucking and warehousing businesses. He joined the Democratic Party and became active. He ran and was elected to the Alabama House of Representatives in 1970; in 1978 he was elected to the Alabama Senate for the 34th district.

When he left the state House and the state Senate, he was succeeded each time by Ann Bedsole, a Mobile businesswoman, philanthropist, and a moderate Republican. In 1982, Callahan lost a Democratic bid to become lieutenant governor of the state.

During this period since the social changes of the 1960s, which resulted in African Americans regaining their ability to exercise their franchise in southern states, many white former Democrats in the South were shifting to the Republican Party. However, conservative Democrats like Callahan continued to do well at the state level in the Mobile area.

When 10-term Republican congressman Jack Edwards decided not to run for re-election in 1984, Callahan was heavily wooed by both parties to run for the seat. He ultimately decided to run as a Republican. Callahan won by 4,000 votes, mostly on the strength of a 6,000-vote margin in the heavily Republican Baldwin County. Callahan was also undoubtedly helped by the presence of the popular President Ronald Reagan atop the ticket that year for his second term; Reagan carried the 1st district with more than 60 percent of the vote. To date, 1984 is the only time the Democrats have come close to retaking the 1st congressional district since Edwards won it for the Republicans in 1964.

Callahan would never face another contest nearly that close. He was unopposed for reelection in 1986, a year that was far more difficult for Republicans at the national level. He easily defeated underfunded Democratic challengers for the House seat in 1988, 1992, 1994, and 1996. He ran unopposed in 1990 and 1998, and faced only a Libertarian challenger in 2000. The Democrats have never come reasonably close to winning the seat since Callahan's initial run; indeed, the 1984 contest is the only time since the GOP began its current run in the seat that a Democrat has managed even 40 percent of the vote. However, conservative Democrats continued to hold a number of state and local offices in the district well into the 1990s.

Callahan voted against the Abandoned Shipwrecks Act of 1987. The Act asserts United States title to certain abandoned shipwrecks located on or embedded in submerged lands under state jurisdiction, and transfers title to the respective state, thereby empowering states to manage these cultural and historical resources more efficiently, with the goal of preventing treasure hunters and salvagers from damaging them. Despite his vote against it, President Ronald Reagan signed it into law on April 28, 1988.

When the Republicans won control of Congress in 1994, Callahan became the chairman of the House Appropriations Subcommittee on Foreign Operations, Export Financing and Related Programs. Callahan had voted against numerous foreign aid bills before taking the chairmanship, and he remained skeptical of foreign aid. In 1998 it became known that Callahan was speaking by phone with President Bill Clinton during one of the President's first sexual encounters with aide Monica Lewinsky. In 2001, Callahan became the chairman of the Energy and Water Development subcommittee.

Callahan retired from the House in 2003. His chief of staff, Jo Bonner, won the election to replace Callahan, receiving huge support from both Callahan and Edwards.

After leaving Congress, Callahan founded Sonny Callahan and Associates, a lobbying firm that he headed. He served as campaign chairman for businessman Tim James' unsuccessful bid for the Republican nomination for Governor of Alabama. Callahan also joined Dawson & Associates in Washington, D.C., as an advisor on federal budget and permitting matters.

== Steve Russo scandal ==
In the Summer of 2004, Callahan wrote a letter to State Lands Director James Hillman Griggs, complaining that Federal Coastal Zone Management pass-through grant money, which had been entrusted to the City of Orange Beach for beach development, was not going to the intended recipients. Griggs' office investigated and cancelled the grant and additional funding requested by Orange Beach Mayor Steve Russo and City Attorney Larry Sutley. The United States Department of Justice initiated an investigation and indicted the two officials as well as developer Ken Wall. In 2006, Russo, Sutley, and Wall were convicted of corruption and obstruction of justice related to a scheme to "enrich the mayor in exchange for favorable treatment [of developers] on large construction projects in the city."

== Death ==
Callahan died on June 25, 2021, at the age of 88.

== See also ==
- List of American politicians who switched parties in office

U.S. House of Representatives
Preceded by Jack Edwards	Member of the U.S. House of Representatives from Alabama's 1st congressional district 1985–2003	Succeeded by Jo Bonner
