= Ann Bedsole =

American politician (1930–2025)

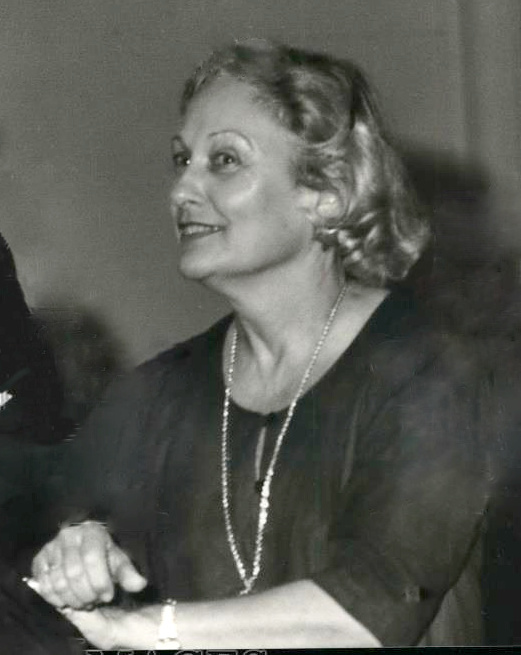
- Bedsole in 1985

Member of the Alabama Senate from the 34th district
- In office 1982–1994
- Preceded by: Sonny Callahan
- Succeeded by: Hap Myers

Member of the Alabama House of Representatives from the 101st district
- In office 1978–1982
- Preceded by: Sonny Callahan
- Succeeded by: Ken Kvalheim

Personal details
- Born: Margaret Anna Smith; January 7, 1930 Selma, Alabama, U.S.
- Died: December 1, 2025 (aged 95)
- Party: Republican
- Spouse(s): Massey Palmer Bedsole Jr. Nicholas Hanson Holmes Jr.
- Children: 3

Ann Smith Bedsole (born Margaret Anna Smith; January 7, 1930 – December 1, 2025) was an American politician, businesswoman, community activist and philanthropist. She was the first Republican woman to serve in the Alabama House of Representatives and the first woman to serve in the Alabama Senate. In 2002, she was inducted into the Alabama Academy of Honor.

== Early life ==
Margaret Anna Smith was born on January 7, 1930, in Selma, Alabama, to Malcolm White Smith and Sybil Huey Smith. She had one sister. When she was five, her father moved the family to Jackson, Alabama where he had bought a sawmill; she went on to work there as a teen. She graduated from Waynesboro High School in Waynesboro, Virginia, and later attended the University of Alabama and the University of Denver.

== Political career ==
During the 1964 Republican presidential primaries Smith served as an alternate delegate to the Republican National Convention. She served on the Alabama Republican State Executive Committee in 1966. During the 1972 Republican presidential primaries, she served as a delegate to the Republican National Convention, vice-chair of the Alabama delegation to the Republican National Convention, and as one of two Republican at-large presidential electors alongside state Representative Doug Hale. Smith later served as chair of the Republican Party in the 4th Ward in Mobile, Alabama.

=== Alabama state legislature ===
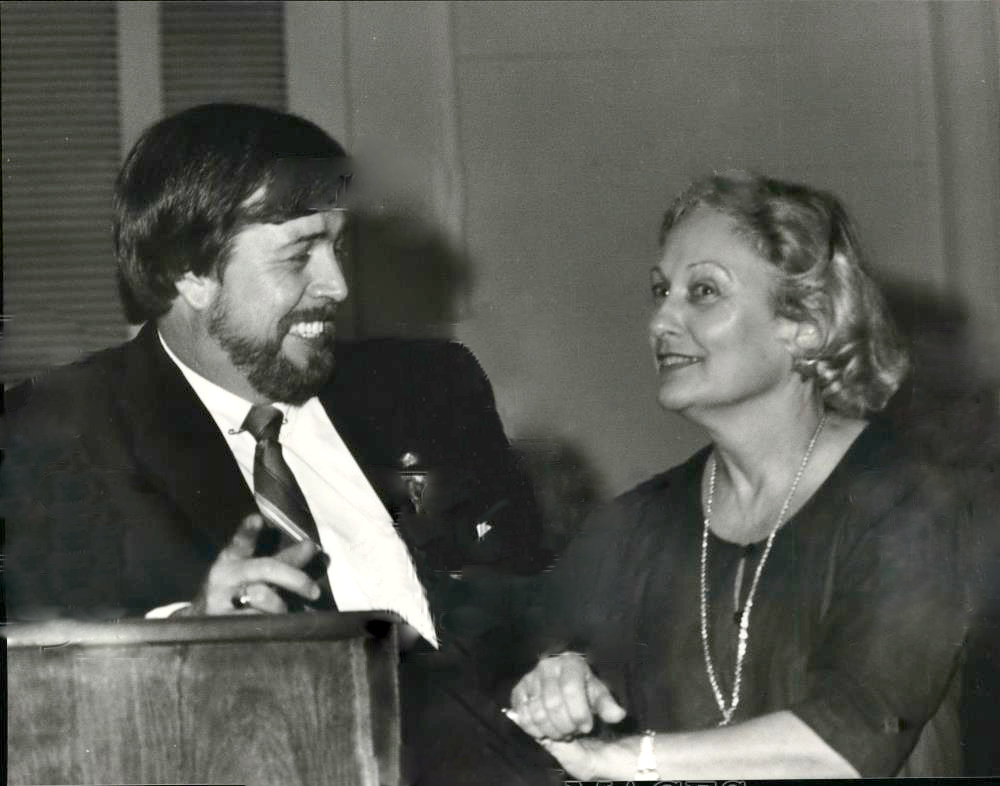
Alabama state senators Danny Corbett and Ann Bedsole, 1985

In 1978, Sonny Callahan, a member of the Alabama House of Representatives from the 101st district, announced that he would seek election to the Alabama Senate. Bedsole received the Republican nomination and defeated Democratic nominee Jim Johnston in the general election, becoming the first female Republican member of the Alabama House of Representatives.

In 1982, Callahan, a member of the Alabama Senate from the 34th district, vacated his seat. Bedsole ran with the Republican nomination for his seat and defeated Democratic nominee John Saad in the general election, becoming the first woman to serve in the Alabama Senate. For her first Senate re-election campaign, she printed campaign flyers that included a timetable for the state's hunting season on the back. She was re-elected to the Alabama Senate three times and served until 1995.

Bedsole was appointed to serve on the Education Committee in the Alabama Senate in 1983. She was appointed to serve on the Judiciary, Education, and Health committees and as chair of the Agriculture, Conservation and Forestry committee in 1987.

=== Gubernatorial campaign ===
On November 1, 1993, Bedsole announced that she would seek the Republican nomination for Governor of Alabama in 1994. She selected Rex Elsasse, the former executive director of the Ohio Republican Party, to serve as her campaign manager. She placed second in the Republican primary, but was defeated in the primary runoff by Fob James.

During Alabama's 1998 gubernatorial election, Bedsole endorsed Democratic nominee Don Siegelman against Governor Fob James. In 2005, she unsuccessfully ran for mayor of Mobile.

== Other activities ==
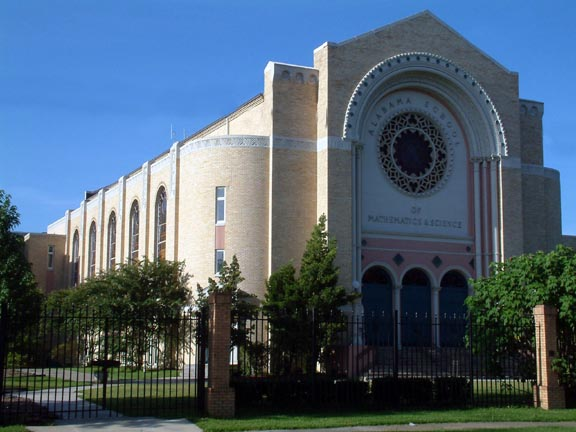
Central campus building at the Alabama School of Mathematics and Science

In the late 1980s, Bedsole was one of the co-founders of the Alabama School of Mathematics and Science, which was approved by the Alabama state legislature in 1989. The school later added a library named in her honor. This institution remains the "only fully public residential high school for sophomores, juniors, and seniors seeking advanced studies in mathematics, science, and the humanities" in the state.

Bedsole also founded Bedsole Farms in Perdue Hill in 2008.

== Memberships and affiliations ==
Bedsole was involved in numerous educational and philanthropic initiatives. She served on the board of directors of the Alabama School of Mathematics and Science as president and vice president. She was a trustee for Spring Hill College and Huntingdon College. She chaired the distribution committee for the Sybil H. Smith Charitable Trust (later renamed the Sybil and White Smith Foundation), and was also a board member of the J. L. Bedsole Foundation, which awarded grants for projects benefiting post-secondary education, the arts, and economic development in southwest Alabama.

Bedsole was also dedicated to promoting local history, preservation, and conservation. She established Mobile Historic Home Tours and served as a member of the Alabama Historical Commission, the Mobile Historic Development Commission, and the Mobile Bay Lighthouse Committee. In 1999, she became president of the Mobile Tricentennial, working for three years with hundreds of volunteers to produce programming for the event. Additionally, she was the founder and president of the Alabama Forest Resources Center.

== Personal life and death ==
In 1949, she married John Henry ("Rod") Martin, Jr. and they had two children, Mary and John Henry III. In 1958, she married Massey Palmer Bedsole Jr., with whom she had one child, Loraine Massey Demmas Bedsole. Bedsole Jr. died in 2006. In 2014, she remarried to Nicholas Hanson Holmes Jr., who died in 2016.

Bedsole was a Methodist and a member of the Junior League. She was feted with a 90th birthday party by students at the Alabama School of Mathematics and Science in January 2020.

Bedsole died on December 1, 2025, at the age of 95.

== Awards and honors ==
Bedsole was recognized for her business and philanthropic activity by being named First Lady of Mobile in 1972, Mobilian of the Year in 1993, and Philanthropist of the Year in 1998. She received a Meritorious Public Service Award from the Montgomery Advertiser and the Alabama Journal. In 2002, she was inducted into the Alabama Academy of Honor, which recognizes living persons for their achievements and contributions to the state. She was also the recipient of honorary Doctor of Law degrees from Spring Hill College and Huntingdon College.
