= Perry Hand =

American politician

47th Secretary of State of Alabama
- In office 1989–1991
- Governor: H. Guy Hunt
- Preceded by: Fred Crawford
- Succeeded by: Billy Joe Camp

Member of the Alabama Senate from the 32nd district
- In office 1983–1989
- Preceded by: Jerry Boyington
- Succeeded by: Albert Lipscomb

Personal details
- Party: Republican
- Education: Auburn University (BS)

Perry A. Hand was appointed Alabama's 47th Secretary of State in November 1989 and served from 1989 to January 1991. He attempted to run for a full term in 1990, but lost to Billy Joe Camp by over 115,000 votes. He also served as Alabama Highway Director from 1991 to 1993 and served for two terms in the Alabama State Senate, representing the 32nd district.

Currently, Hand is Chairman and CEO of Volkert, Inc., a privately held consulting firm based in Mobile, Alabama. The company offers engineering, environmental consulting, program management, and construction services.

Hand is an alumnus of the Auburn University where he graduated in 1969 with a B.S. in Civil Engineering.

Party political offices
Preceded by Jim Watley	Republican nominee for Secretary of State of Alabama; 1990	Succeeded by Vickie Gavin
