= Bradley Byrne =

American politician and attorney (born 1955)

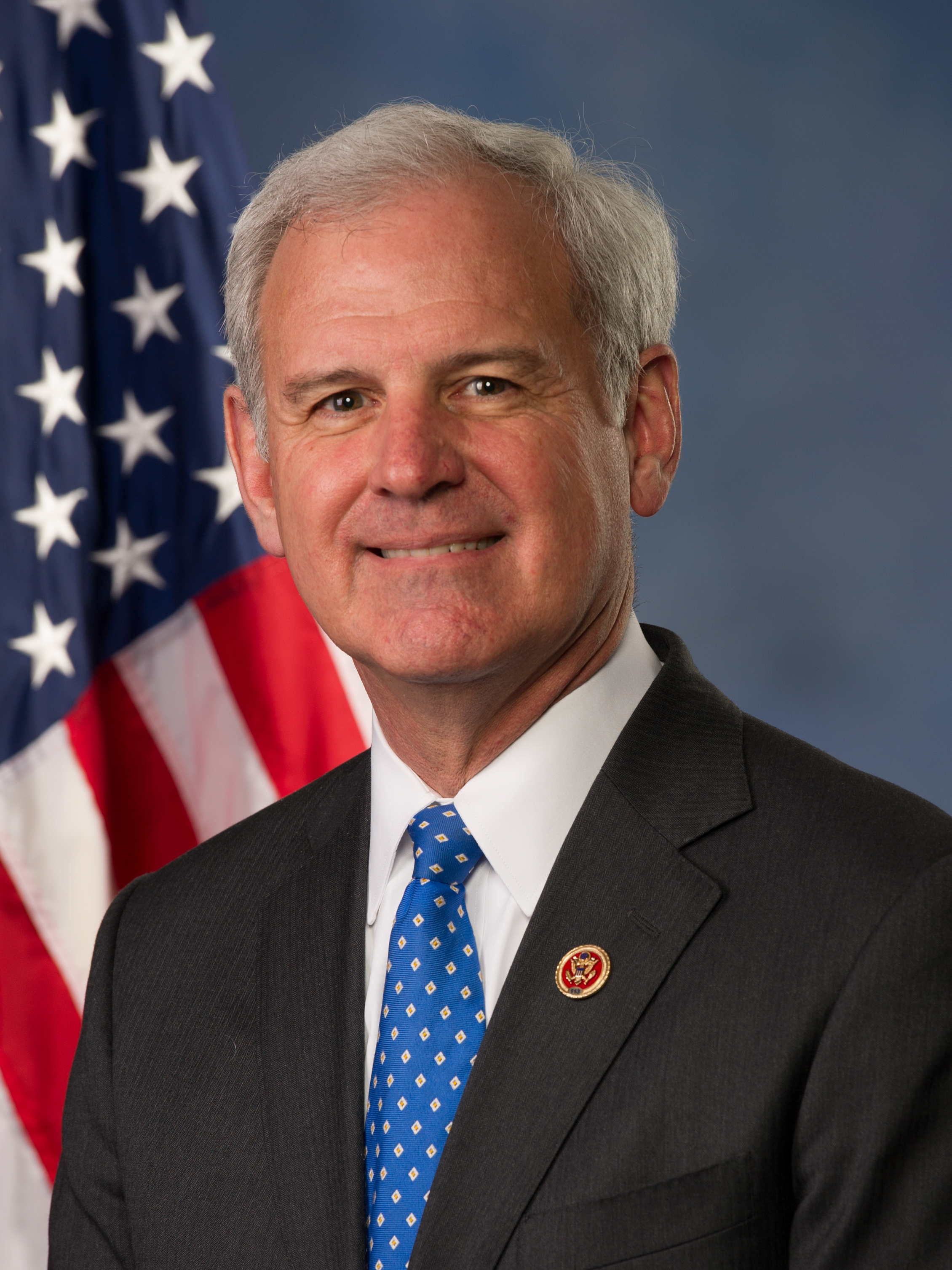
- Official portrait, 2014

Member of the U.S. House of Representatives from Alabama's 1st district
- In office December 17, 2013 – January 3, 2021 (Note: Byrne's official service begins on the date of the special election, while he was not sworn in until January 8, 2014.)
- Preceded by: Jo Bonner
- Succeeded by: Jerry Carl

Chancellor of the Alabama Community College System
- In office May 2007 – August 31, 2009
- Preceded by: Roy Johnson
- Succeeded by: Freida Hill

Member of the Alabama Senate from the 32nd district
- In office November 2002 – January 2007
- Preceded by: Albert Lipscomb
- Succeeded by: Trip Pittman

Member of the Alabama State Board of Education from the 1st district
- In office January 3, 1995 – January 4, 2003
- Preceded by: John Tyson
- Succeeded by: Randy McKinney

Personal details
- Born: Bradley Roberts Byrne; February 16, 1955 (age 71) Mobile, Alabama, U.S.
- Party: Democratic (before 1997); Republican (1997–present)
- Spouse: Rebecca Dukes (m. 1982)
- Children: 4
- Education: Duke University (BA); University of Alabama (JD)
- Byrne's voice Byrne on an amendment to support the oyster industry on the Gulf Coast. Recorded September 28, 2016

Bradley Roberts Byrne (born February 16, 1955) is an American attorney and politician who served as the U.S. representative for Alabama's 1st congressional district from 2014 to 2021. Elected as a member of the state Board of Education as a Democrat in 1994, he became a member of the Republican Party in 1997 and served in the Alabama Senate from 2003 to 2007, representing the state's 32nd district.

Byrne was chancellor of the Alabama Community College System from 2007 until he resigned in 2009 to run for the 2010 Republican nomination for governor of Alabama. In December 2013 he won a special election to represent the state's 1st congressional district in the United States House of Representatives. Byrne ran in the Republican primary for the 2020 United States Senate election in Alabama but was defeated in the first round of the primary by Tommy Tuberville and Jeff Sessions.

== Early life and education ==
Bradley Roberts Byrne was born on February 16, 1955, in Mobile, Alabama. He was one of three children. He was raised in Baldwin County, Alabama. He attended UMS-Wright Preparatory School in Mobile, graduating in 1973. Byrne graduated from Duke University in 1977. At Duke, he became a member of the Phi Delta Theta fraternity. In 1980, he graduated from the University of Alabama School of Law. He was classmates with Mo Brooks. After graduation, he became a private practice lawyer.

== Political background ==
Byrne's first run for elective office, in 1994, was a success when he was elected to the Alabama State Board of Education as a Democrat. During his term on the Board of Education, Byrne supported a science curriculum that was opposed by many religious leaders in Alabama. He later voted with the Board to support a compromise that said, "Explanations of the origin of life and major groups of plants and animals, including humans, shall be treated as theory and not as fact. When attempting to apply scientific knowledge to world problems, no social agenda shall be promoted." In 1996 Byrne voted with the majority of board members to reject $18 million in federal education funds because it was feared the money would allow greater federal control of schools. The vote was seen as a nod to the growing conservative influence in his south Alabama district. Byrne later changed his mind and convinced the Board to allow the money.

In 1997 Byrne left the Democratic Party and became a Republican.

In 2002 Byrne ran for an Alabama State Senate seat, representing part of Baldwin County. He won with 91% of the vote over his Democratic challenger.

== Chancellor of Alabama's Community College System ==
In May 2007 Byrne took the position of community college chancellor and oversaw a controversial reordering of much of the system. Bishop State Community College in Mobile was the target of investigators who found both financial and academic issues at the school in 2006 and 2007. Byrne ordered an audit of the school, which demonstrated many deficiencies. At the time, about two dozen people were charged with criminal fraud and theft charges. A total of 27 were charged before the probe ended in May 2007.

Byrne also worked with Alabama Attorney General Troy King to recover money stolen from the community college system. He resigned as Chancellor on August 31, 2009.

== 2010 gubernatorial campaign ==
During the campaign, he was accused by his opponents in the Republican primary of supporting evolution and of doubting that the Bible was infallible. Byrne responded, "as a Christian and as a public servant, I have never wavered in my belief that this world and everything in it is a masterpiece created by the hands of God ... As a member of the Alabama Board of Education, the record clearly shows that I fought to ensure the teaching of creationism in our school text books. Those who attack me have distorted, twisted and misrepresented my comments and are spewing utter lies to the people of this state." He also added that he believed "every single word" of the Bible was true.

== Post-election activity ==
Following the runoff, Byrne went back to practicing business law, joining the law firm Jones Walker on August 16, 2010.

=== Reform Alabama ===
On February 23, 2011, Byrne announced he was partnering with other prominent Alabamians to create a nonprofit organization that would push for reforms in state government. Named Reform Alabama, the organization actively supported legislation in the 2011 Alabama Regular Legislative Session.

=== Alabama Supreme Court campaign ===
In 2011, Byrne considered running for chief justice of the Alabama Supreme Court in the 2012 election, but ultimately did not enter the race.

== United States House of Representatives ==
=== Elections ===
==== 2013 special election ====
On May 23, 2013, U.S. Representative Jo Bonner announced that he would resign, effective August 15, 2013.

Byrne finished first in the Republican primary and faced Tea Party candidate Dean Young in the runoff election. Byrne won the runoff, but Young refused to endorse him, which led to rumors of a rift within the Republican Party. Byrne subsequently gained the endorsement of Alabama Patriots, a Tea Party-affiliated organization. Byrne faced Democratic Party nominee Burton LeFlore on December 17, 2013. Byrne won the election with 71% of the vote. At the time of his election, Byrne was only the sixth person to represent this Mobile-based district since 1919, continuing an unbroken run of Republican control in the district dating back to 1965.

==== 2014 ====
Byrne was originally expected to be running for reelection unopposed, but Burton LeFlore, his Democratic opponent in the 2013 special election, qualified. Byrne was reelected with 68% of the vote. The district has a PVI of R+15.

==== 2016 ====
Byrne won the Republican primary with 60.1% over his 2013 challenger Young. He was unopposed in the general election.

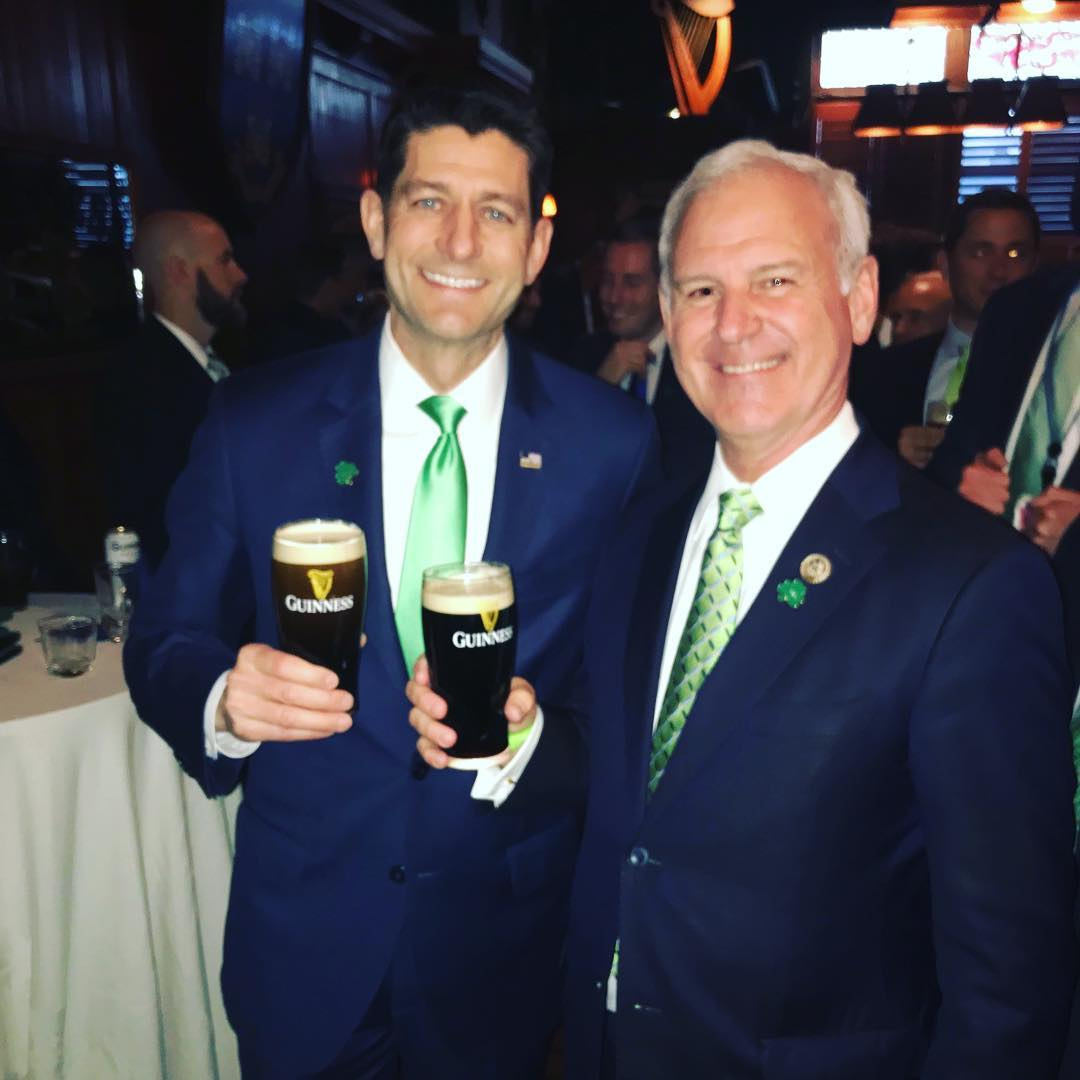
Bradley Byrne with Paul Ryan in 2018 on St. Patrick's Day

==== 2018 ====
Byrne was unopposed in the primary election. He won the general election by 63.15% to 36.78% over Democrat Robert Kennedy, Jr.

=== Tenure and political positions ===
As of the end of 2019, Byrne had voted in line with President Donald Trump's position 96.8% of the time, in line with the majority of House Republicans 91.9–98.4% of the time, and against the majority of House Republicans 1.6%–8.1% of the time. In 2019, David M. McIntosh, of the conservative lobby organization Club for Growth, called Byrne "not a conservative" and a "fake politician."

==== Abortion ====
Byrne is pro-life. In 2011, he co-sponsored the Prenatal Nondiscrimination Act, which would have banned abortions based on race or sex. Two years later, in 2013, he co-sponsored the Title X Abortion Provider Prohibition Act, which would have prohibited federal funds supporting family planning organizations that provide abortions, with exceptions for rape, incest, or if the mother's life is at risk. Byrne also co-sponsored an amendment to the Fourteenth Amendment to the United States Constitution that would categorize fetuses as human beings.

==== Civil rights ====
In 2019 Byrne voted against the Equality Act, a bill that would expand the federal Civil Rights Act of 1964 to ban discrimination based on sexual orientation and gender identity. In House debates on the legislation, Byrne criticized the bill, calling it "radical" and "deeply troubling."

==== Drugs ====
Byrne was given a "D" rating from NORML for his pro-cannabis stance. NORML describes him as "hard on drugs." Byrne supports the federal government preventing states from legalizing medical marijuana. In 2019, he voted against the SAFE Banking Act.

==== Environment ====
In 2014, Byrne signed the Lawful Ivory Protection Act.

==== Foreign policy ====
In October 2019 Byrne and Mo Brooks were the only Republican members of the Alabama House delegation to vote against a resolution condemning Trump for removing U.S. military forces from Syria, which had greatly endangered the Kurdish resistance to the Islamic State in Syria (ISIS).

In 2017, Byrne voted in favor of legislation imposing additional sanctions on Russia, Iran, and North Korea, which passed on a 419–3 vote. In 2019, however, Byrne voted against a measure disapproving of the Trump administration's plan to lift sanctions imposed against three Russian firms.

In 2019, Byrne voted against measures to halt U.S. arms sales to Saudi Arabia and the United Arab Emirates, and also voted against legislation to end U.S. military aid to Saudi Arabia in the Saudi Arabian-led intervention in Yemen.

==== Guns and criminal justice ====
Byrne has a history of supporting gun rights. He voted against universal background check legislation for gun sales, and against a measure to grant law enforcement additional time to run background checks for gun sales. In 2015, Byrne co-sponsored legislature to allow cross-state concealed carry. In 2019, he hosted a town hall meeting at a gun store, three days after the Dayton mass shooting, which killed 9 people. During the meeting, Byrne said that red flag laws violate the Second Amendment and are not effective.

Byrne voted against the 2018 First Step Act, a criminal justice reform measure. The National Association of Police Organizations (NAPO) gave Byrne a 38% rating, describing him as having a "police-the-police stance" for his police-related legislation support.

==== Health care ====
In 2015, Byrne was the chief sponsor of Republican legislation to repeal the Affordable Care Act. In 2017, he promoted Republican proposals to dismantle the ACA, and voted for a January 2017 budget resolution to repeal the ACA. Byrne also voted for the American Health Care Act, the Republican repeal-and-replace legislation, in May 2017.

==== Homeland security ====
In 2015, Byrne co-sponsored a bill that would have limited transfer of Guantanamo prisoners to the United States or other countries.

==== Immigration ====
In 2015, Byrne sponsored bills to ban the admission of any Syrian people into the United States. Byrne supported President Donald Trump's 2017 executive order temporarily banning citizens of seven Muslim-majority countries from entering the U.S.

During the federal government shutdown of 2018–19, Byrne voted against proposals to fund the government without appropriations for a border wall. He voted against legislation that sought to terminate an emergency declaration that diverted funds to the border wall and voted to sustain Trump's veto of the legislation.

==== Roy Moore endorsement ====
In the 2017 Alabama Senate special election to replace U.S. Senator Jeff Sessions, who had vacated his seat upon being nominated and subsequently confirmed to the position of U.S. Attorney General in the Trump administration, Byrne endorsed the Republican nominee, Roy Moore. During the campaign, at least nine women alleged that Moore had either sexually assaulted them or made inappropriate romantic or sexual advances toward them while he was an assistant district attorney and the women were teenagers as young as 14, or while he was a lawyer and the women were clients. Following the initial allegations, additional women alleged misconduct, including attempted rape of a 16-year-old. Moore denied the allegations and his campaign and supporters began questioning the victims' motives and veracity and said they would mount an investigation of the women's motives. Immediately after the allegations and instances of victim intimidation, numerous Republicans rescinded their endorsements of Moore, but Byrne did not, nor did he condemn the Moore campaign's threats against his accusers or call on Moore to drop out of the race. In response to Byrne's continuing support of Moore, Alabama's statewide newspaper group AL.com began running editorial cartoons titled "I am Roy Moore" with a picture of Byrne and the caption "You condone it, you own it."

==== The Squad ====
In 2020, Byrne released a campaign ad criticizing The Squad, then a group of four women members of the House of Representatives. In the commercial, he described one of the members, Ilhan Omar, as "cheapening 9/11". In a voice-over in the commercial Byrne says, "The Squad attacking America. Dale fought for that right. I will not let them tear this country up."

==== Taxation and economic issues ====
In 2010, Byrne signed the Taxpayer Protection Pledge, pledging that he would not introduce new taxes. In 2017 he voted for the Republican tax legislation, saying that the bill's passage would "lead to greater economic growth, higher wages, and more jobs."

Byrne voted for 2017 legislation to repeal some banking regulations enacted as part of the Dodd-Frank Act. He voted against legislation to raise the federal minimum wage to $15 per hour.

==== Transportation ====
Byrne supports building a new I-10 bridge across the Mobile Bay. He also wants to extend the Foley Beach Express to I-65.

==== Donald Trump ====
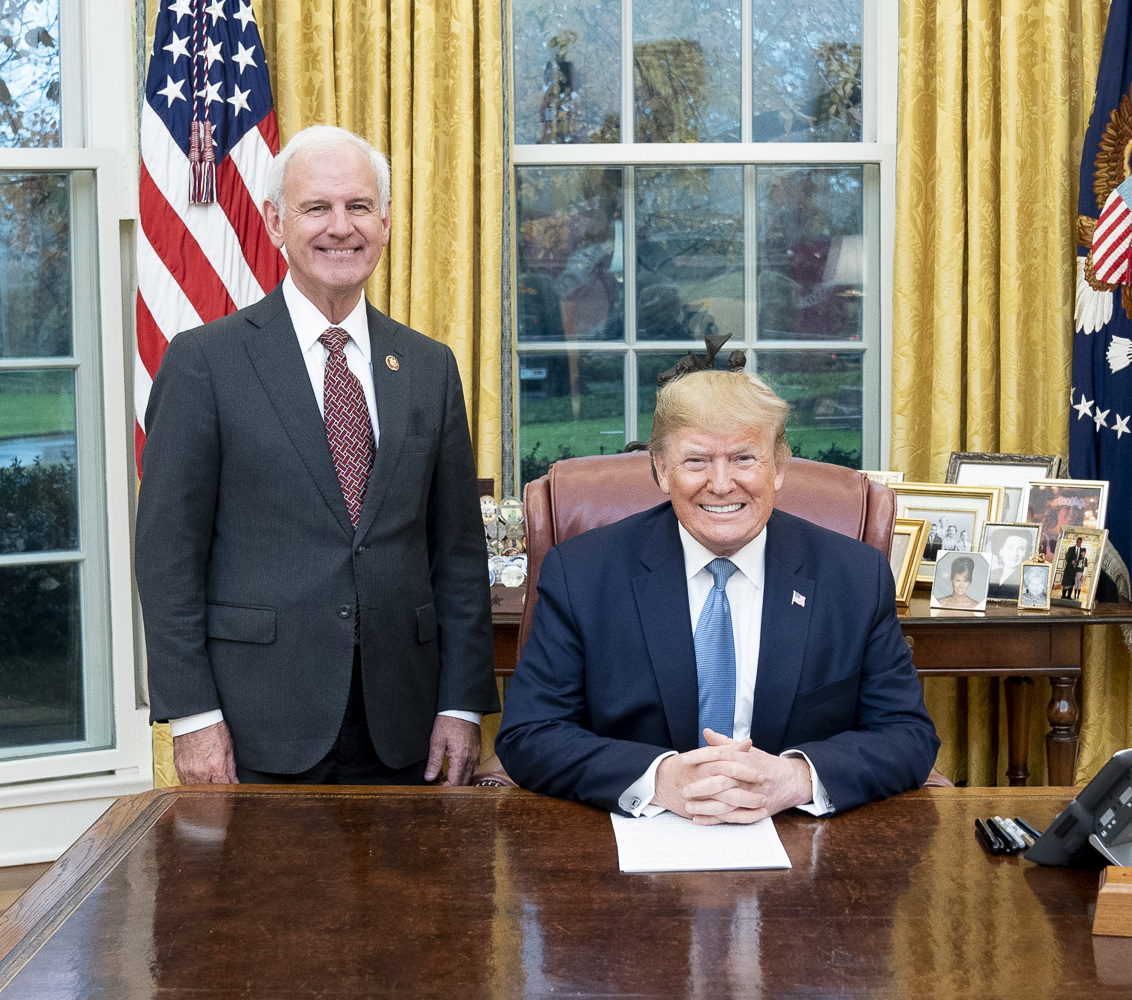
Bradley Byrne with Donald Trump in the Oval Office, December 2019.

Byrne has touted his unwavering support for Donald Trump, despite early criticism of Trump. In 2016, Byrne said that Trump should drop out of the presidential election after the release of the Access Hollywood tapes. Just before the election, Byrne said he would vote for Trump.

===== Trump impeachment and disruption of hearings =====
On October 23, 2019, Gary Palmer, Jim Jordan, Byrne and Brooks joined about two dozen other House Republicans in aggressively intruding upon a Sensitive Compartmented Information Facility (SCIF) where Republican and Democratic congressional members (Note: In the 116th Congress, the chair (Schiff) and 12 Democratic members of the House Intelligence Committee were appointed by the Speaker of the House, Nancy Pelosi, who is a committee member ex officio. The House Minority Leader, Kevin McCarthy, also an ex officio member, appointed the ranking member, Devin Nunes, and eight other Republicans to the committee. Each side received equal time to question witnesses appearing before the committee.) had been taking confidential testimony from Deputy Assistant Secretary of Defense Laura Cooper as part of the impeachment inquiry against Donald Trump. Brooks had given an incendiary speech before joining the non-committee Republicans forcing their way into the hearing room, carrying electronic devices that are prohibited in SCIFs. The disruption delayed Cooper's testimony by many hours. House Homeland Security Committee Chairman Bennie Thompson wrote to the House Sergeant-at-Arms requesting that he take action regarding their "unprecedented breach of security". South Carolina Republican Senator Lindsey Graham admonished his House colleagues for making a "run on the SCIF," calling the stunt "nuts."

Byrne voted against established procedures for the impeachment inquiry against Donald Trump, and voted several times to table the articles of impeachment. In December 2019, he voted against impeaching Trump on charges of abuse of power and obstruction of Congress in connection with the Trump-Ukraine scandal, echoing Trump's rhetoric on impeachment.

==== U.S. national anthem protests ====
In a 2020 campaign advertisement, Byrne described athletes who knelt as part of the U.S. national anthem protests as "dishonoring our flag", with a photograph of Colin Kaepernick kneeling.

==== War and peace ====
In 2020, Byrne began advocating that Huntsville, Alabama, serve as the headquarters for the newly created United States Space Force. The U.S. Space & Rocket Center is in Huntsville.

==== Other legislation ====
Byrne supported a bill that would direct the U.S. Department of Justice to report to the United States Congress whenever any federal agency refrains from enforcing laws or regulations for any reason. In the report, the government would have to explain why it had decided not to enforce that law. Byrne accused the Obama administration of "making an end-run around Congress to achieve through administrative means what they cannot legislatively" and of selectively enforcing the law. He introduced a bill to create a National Museum of Irish American History in 2017. In 2019, Byrne introduced legislation to impose term limits on members of Congress.

=== Committee assignments ===
- Armed Services Committee
  - Subcommittee on Strategic Forces
  - Subcommittee on Seapower & Projection Forces
- House Education and Labor Committee
  - Subcommittee on Workforce Protections (Ranking member)
- House Rules Committee (2015-2018)

Byrne was a member of the United States Congressional International Conservation Caucus and the Republican Study Committee.

== 2020 U.S. Senate election ==
On February 20, 2019, Byrne announced his candidacy for the 2020 United States Senate election in Alabama, challenging incumbent Democratic U.S. Senator Doug Jones. He accused Jones of not supporting "Alabama's interests and Alabama values" in his announcement speech. Byrne was defeated in the first round of the Republican primary; he won districts near Mobile but did poorly elsewhere in the state. Tommy Tuberville and Jeff Sessions advanced to the Republican primary runoff.

== Electoral history ==
Republican primary results, 2010
Party	Candidate	Votes	%
Republican	Bradley Byrne	137,349	27.89
Republican	Robert J. Bentley	123,870	25.15
Republican	Tim James	123,662	25.11
Republican	Roy Moore	95,077	19.31
Republican	Bill Johnson	8,350	1.70
Republican	Charles Taylor	2,622	0.53
Republican	James Potts	1,549	0.31
Total votes		492,480	100.00

Republican primary runoff results, 2010
Party	Candidate	Votes	%
Republican	Robert J. Bentley	260,887	56.07
Republican	Bradley Byrne	204,394	43.93
Total votes		465,281	100.00

Republican primary results, 2013
Party	Candidate	Votes	%
Republican	Bradley Byrne	18,090	34.57%
Republican	Dean Young	12,011	22.95%
Republican	Chad Fincher	8,177	15.63%
Republican	Quin Hillyer	7,260	13.87%
Republican	Wells Griffith	5,758	11.00%
Republican	Daniel Dyas	391	0.75%
Republican	Jessica James	391	0.75%
Republican	Sharon Powe	184	0.35%
Republican	David Thornton	72	0.14%
Total votes		52,344	100.00%

Republican primary runoff results, 2013
Party	Candidate	Votes	%
Republican	Bradley Byrne	38,150	52.5%
Republican	Dean Young	34,534	47.5%
Total votes		72,684	100.00%

Alabama's 1st congressional district special election, 2013
Party	Candidate	Votes	%
Republican	Bradley Byrne	36,042	71.0
Democratic	Burton LeFlore	14,968	29.0
Total votes		51,010	100.0
Republican hold			

Alabama's 1st congressional district, 2014
Party	Candidate	Votes	%
Republican	Bradley Byrne (incumbent)	103,758	68.2
Democratic	Burton LeFlore	48,278	31.7
Write-in		198	0.1
Total votes		152,234	100.0
Republican hold			

Republican primary results, 2016
Party	Candidate	Votes	%
Republican	Bradley Byrne (incumbent)	71,310	60.1
Republican	Dean Young	47,319	39.9
Total votes		118,629	100.0

Alabama's 1st congressional district, 2016
Party	Candidate	Votes	%
Republican	Bradley Byrne (incumbent)	208,083	96.4
Write-in		7,810	3.6
Total votes		215,893	100.0
Republican hold			

Alabama's 1st congressional district, 2018
Party	Candidate	Votes	%
Republican	Bradley Byrne (incumbent)	153,228	63.2
Democratic	Robert Kennedy Jr.	89,226	36.8
Write-in		163	0.1
Total votes		242,617	100.0
Republican hold			

United States Senate election in Alabama Republican primary, 2020
Party	Candidate	Votes	%
Republican	Tommy Tuberville	239,616	33.39%
Republican	Jeff Sessions	227,088	31.64%
Republican	Bradley Byrne	178,627	24.89%
Republican	Roy Moore	51,377	7.16%
Republican	Ruth Page Nelson	7,200	1.00%
Republican	Arnold Mooney	7,149	1.00%
Republican	Stanley Adair	6,608	0.92%
Total votes		717,665	100.0%

== Life after Congress ==
On May 26, 2022, the Mobile (Ala.) Chamber of Commerce announced Byrne would serve as the chief executive officer and president of the organization, effective June 1, 2022. Byrne is an attorney and currently serves as of counsel for Adams and Reese, LLP, a position he will retain while devoting his full-time efforts to the Mobile Chamber.

== Personal life ==
Byrne's family has a farm in Baldwin County, Alabama. Byrne's wife is named Rebecca. Byrne is a fan of the Alabama Crimson Tide. He is an Episcopalian, and typically attends services at St. John's Episcopal Church, Lafayette Square while in Washington.

Byrne's brother, Dale Byrne, died in 2013 during the 2013 election in which Bradley Byrne was participating. Dale Byrne died from a heart attack after suffering from a respiratory illness contracted while serving with the Alabama National Guard in Iraq.

== Notes ==
U.S. House of Representatives
Preceded by Jo Bonner	Member of the U.S. House of Representatives from Alabama's 1st congressional district 2013–2021	Succeeded by Jerry Carl
U.S. order of precedence (ceremonial)
Preceded by Aaron Schock as Former U.S. Representative	Order of precedence of the United States as Former U.S. Representative	Succeeded by Ed Bethune as Former U.S. Representative
