= Albert Lipscomb =

American politician

Member of the Alabama Senate from the 32nd district
- In office 1989–2002
- Preceded by: Perry Hand
- Succeeded by: Bradley Byrne

Personal details
- Born: January 9, 1951 (age 75) Fairhope, Alabama, U.S.
- Party: Republican
- Education: Mobile College
- Profession: farmer

Albert Lipscomb (born January 9, 1951) is an American politician in the American state of Alabama. He served in the Alabama State Senate from 1989 to 2002, representing the 32nd district. Lipscomb currently is a member of the Board of Registrars of Baldwin County, Alabama. He describes himself as a social and fiscal conservative.

Party political offices
Preceded by J. Lee Alley	Republican nominee for Agriculture Commissioner of Alabama; 2006	Succeeded by John McMillan
