= Trip Pittman =

American politician (born 1960)

Member of the Alabama Senate from the 32nd district
- In office 2007–2018
- Preceded by: Bradley Byrne
- Succeeded by: Thomas Christopher Elliott

Personal details
- Born: Lee Pittman; June 22, 1960 (age 66) Birmingham, Alabama, U.S.
- Party: Republican
- Spouse: Lynn
- Children: 3
- Education: University of Alabama, Tuscaloosa (BS)

Lee "Trip" Pittman (born 1960) is an American politician from the state of Alabama. He was a Republican member of the Alabama Senate, representing the 32nd district.

== Early life and education ==
Pittman was born in Birmingham, Alabama, and his hometown is Montrose. He earned a B.S. in commerce and business administration from the University of Alabama in 1982. He is a member of Delta Kappa Epsilon.

== Political career ==
He won a special election on October 16, 2007, to replace former Alabama state senator Bradley Byrne. Pittman was re-elected in November 2010. He served as a delegate for the 2012 Ron Paul presidential campaign.

In 2017, Pittman ran in the Republican primary to fill the vacancy for Jeff Sessions' U.S. Senate seat which became vacant when Sessions became United States Attorney General. Pittman did not receive enough votes to enter the run-off election and endorsed former state Supreme Court Chief Justice Roy Moore.

== Personal life ==
Pittman owns a company that makes and sells tractors in Daphne. He and his wife Lynn have three children. He is a member of the United Methodist Church in Fairhope.
