= Mary G. Montgomery High School =

Location
- 4275 Snow Rd; Semmes, Alabama 36575; United States; 30°46′52″N 88°16′39″W

Information
- Type: Public
- Established: 1965 (61 years ago)
- School district: MCPSS
- Superintendent: Chresal Threadgill
- CEEB code: 012450
- Faculty: 100
- Teaching staff: 110.00 (FTE)
- Grades: 9–12
- Enrollment: 1,918 (2023–2024)
- Student to teacher ratio: 17.44
- Colors: Columbia blue and black
- Song: Skol, Vikings
- Mascot: Vikings
- Nickname: MGM
- Website: www.mgmvikings.com

Mary Gillen Montgomery High School is a high school in Semmes, Mobile County, Alabama, United States. Founded in 1965, the school is part of the Mobile County Public School System and is one of the largest of the county's 18 public high schools. The school is known as "MGM," "Mary G," "Mary Montgomery," or "Montgomery High".

The school serves: Semmes and the community of Wilmer, the latter formerly an incorporated municipality.

== Enrollment ==
MGM draws its students primarily from Semmes Middle School, which is one of the largest middle schools in the state of Alabama. The school serves grades 9–12.

== History ==
MGM is named after Mary Gillen Montgomery. She was a student, teacher, and administrator in the Mobile County Public School System for 50 years. She was associated with MGM for 39 years.

== Facilities ==
The campus spans a 60-acre (240,000 m^{2}) tract bordering US Highway 98 and Snow Road in west Mobile County, Alabama (Lat. 30.7811° N, Long. 88.2775° W). Facilities include a large football stadium, baseball stadium, gymnasium, field house/athletic center, soccer field, fine arts facilities, and a notable horticulture facility and program.

== Army JROTC ==
The school offers an Army Junior Reserve Officers' Training Corps program that emphasizes academics and physical fitness. Program participants compete in rifle and drill competitions.

== School uniforms ==
Montgomery requires school uniforms. Ninth graders wear black collared shirts. Tenth grade and above students white or Carolina blue collared shirts. Students are also allowed to wear MGM shirts purchased from the school. Students must wear khaki pants and shorts. The school requires ID badges to be worn. Students are provided one clear backpack, and students are not allowed to use opaque backpacks.

== Notable alumni ==
- Terry Adams, professional baseball player
- Jimmy Sexton, professional baseball player
- Ralph Staten, former professional NFL player

== Notable faculty ==
- Rusty Glover, Alabama State Senator
