= Alabama's 34th Senate district =

Alabama's 34th State Senate district
Senator
Jack W. Williams; R–Georgetown
- Demographics: 67.5% White; 23.2% Black; 3.2% Hispanic; 1.7% Asian
- Population (2022): 137,067

Alabama's 34th Senate district is one of 35 districts in the Alabama Senate. The district has been represented by Jack W. Williams since 2018.

== Geography ==
Election	Map	Counties in District
2026; 2022		Portion of Mobile
2018		Portion of Mobile
2014		Portion of Mobile
2010; 2006; 2002		Portion of Mobile

== Election history ==
=== Elections in the 2020s ===
Alabama Senate election, 2022: Senate District 34
Party	Candidate	Votes	%	±%
Republican	Jack W. Williams (Incumbent)	27,043	97.56	−0.20
Write-in		676	2.44	+0.20
Majority		26,367	95.12	−0.40
Turnout		27,719		
Republican hold				

=== Elections in the 2010s ===
Alabama Senate election, 2018: Senate District 34
Party	Candidate	Votes	%	±%
Republican	Jack W. Williams	35,093	97.76	−1.08
Write-in		805	2.24	+1.08
Majority		34,288	95.52	−2.16
Turnout		35,898		
Republican hold				

Alabama Senate election, 2014: Senate District 34
Party	Candidate	Votes	%	±%
Republican	Rusty Glover (Incumbent)	22,451	98.84	−0.03
Write-in		263	1.16	+0.03
Majority		22,188	97.68	−0.07
Turnout		22,714		
Republican hold				

Alabama Senate election, 2010: Senate District 34
Party	Candidate	Votes	%	±%
Republican	Rusty Glover (Incumbent)	34,325	98.87	+0.12
Write-in		391	1.13	-0.12
Majority		33,934	97.75	+0.25
Turnout		34,716		
Republican hold				

=== Elections in the 2000s ===
Alabama Senate election, 2006: Senate District 34
Party	Candidate	Votes	%	±%
Republican	Rusty Glover	27,080	98.75	−1.14
Write-in		343	1.25	+1.14
Majority		26,737	97.50	−2.28
Turnout		27,423		
Republican hold				

Alabama Senate election, 2002: Senate District 34
Party	Candidate	Votes	%	±%
Republican	Hap Myers (Incumbent)	28,723	99.89	−0.01
Write-in		31	0.11	+0.01
Majority		28,692	99.78	−0.03
Turnout		28,754		
Republican hold				

=== Elections in the 1990s ===
Alabama Senate election, 1998: Senate District 34
Party	Candidate	Votes	%	±%
Republican	Hap Myers (Incumbent)	25,993	99.90	+21.62
Write-in		25	0.10	+0.06
Majority		25,968	99.81	+43.21
Turnout		26,018		
Republican hold				

Alabama Senate election, 1994: Senate District 34
Party	Candidate	Votes	%	±%
Republican	Hap Myers	26,449	78.28	−21.36
Democratic	Sylvia Sullivan	7,326	21.68	+21.68
Write-in		14	0.04	-0.32
Majority		19,123	56.60	−42.69
Turnout		33,789		
Republican hold				

Alabama Senate election, 1990: Senate District 34
Party	Candidate	Votes	%	±%
Republican	Ann Bedsole (Incumbent)	23,146	99.64	+32.08
Write-in		83	0.36	+0.36
Majority		23,063	99.29	+60.17
Turnout		23,229		
Republican hold				

=== Elections in the 1980s ===
Alabama Senate election, 1986: Senate District 34
Party	Candidate	Votes	%	±%
Republican	Ann Bedsole (Incumbent)	24,379	67.56	−32.44
Democratic	J. Thomas Sandusky	11,705	32.44	+32.44
Majority		12,674	35.12	−64.88
Turnout		36,084		
Republican hold				

Alabama Senate election, 1983: Senate District 34
Party	Candidate	Votes	%	±%
Republican	Ann Bedsole (Incumbent)	8,967	100.00	+48.08
Majority		8,967	100.00	+96.16
Turnout		8,967		
Republican hold				

Alabama Senate election, 1982: Senate District 34
Party	Candidate	Votes	%	±%
Republican	Ann Bedsole	16,596	51.92	
Democratic	John E. Saad	15,368	48.08	
Independent	Jean Sullivan	2	0.01	
Majority		1,228	3.84	
Turnout		31,966		
Republican gain from Democratic				

== District officeholders ==
Senators take office at midnight on the day of their election.

- Jack W. Williams (2018–present)
- Rusty Glover (2006–2018)
- Hap Myers (1994–1998)
- Ann Bedsole (1982–1994)
- Sonny Callahan (1978–1982)
- Lionel W. Noonan Sr. (1974–1978)

Not in use 1966–1974.

- Charles T. Mathews (1962–1966)
- John E. Gaither (1958–1962)
- Staten Tate (1954–1958)
