= Jack W. Williams (politician) =

Alabama politician

Member of the Alabama Senate from the 34th district
- Incumbent
- Assumed office November 7, 2018
- Preceded by: Rusty Glover

Member of the Alabama House of Representatives from the 102nd district
- In office November 5, 2014 – November 7, 2018
- Preceded by: Chad Fincher
- Succeeded by: Shane Stringer

Personal details
- Born: Mobile County, Alabama
- Party: Republican
- Profession: businessman, publisher

John "Jack" W. Williams is an American politician. He is a member of the Alabama Senate representing the 34th District, since 2018, and was previously a member of the Alabama House of Representatives from the 102nd District, serving from 2014 to 2018. He is a member of the Republican party.

In 2024, he sponsored legislation to ban the manufacture, sell, or distribution of lab-grown meat in Alabama. The bill passed the Alabama legislature and was signed into law by Governor Kay Ivey. The law comes into effect in October 2024.
