= Semmes, Alabama =

City in Alabama, United States

- City
- Flag Seal
- Interactive map of Semmes
- Location within Alabama Location within the United States
- Coordinates: 30°45′44″N 88°14′46″W
- Country: United States
- State: Alabama
- County: Mobile

Area
  - Total: 14.63 sq mi (37.89 km^{2})
  - Land: 14.59 sq mi (37.80 km^{2})
  - Water: 0.035 sq mi (0.09 km^{2})
- Elevation: 190 ft (58 m)

Population (2020)
  - Total: 4,941
  - Density: 338.5/sq mi (130.71/km^{2})
- Time zone: UTC-6 (CST)
  - Summer (DST): UTC-5 (CDT)
- ZIP code: 36575
- Area code: 251
- FIPS code: 01-69240
- GNIS feature ID: 2680031
- Website: cityofsemmesal.gov

Semmes (/sɪmz/simz) is a city in western Mobile County, Alabama, in the Mobile metropolitan area. It was incorporated in 2011. As of the 2020 census, the population was 4,941.

== History ==
The community was named for Admiral Raphael Semmes (1809–1877), an officer in the United States Navy from 1826 to 1861 and the Confederate States Navy from 1861 to 1865.

=== Incorporation ===
On March 3, 2010, the members of the Friends of Semmes and the associated Incorporate Semmes organizations presented Mobile County Probate Judge Don Davis with a petition seeking to incorporate an area within the Semmes community as the City of Semmes. The proposed incorporation did not include the entire area known as Semmes due to certain population density requirements of Alabama state law. Judge Davis set the date for the referendum as Tuesday, August 17, 2010. After voting closed, unofficial returns showed the plebiscite passing with 74.19% of the voters in favor of incorporation. Some voters complained about the "zig-zag" nature of the proposed city limits, which excluded some areas of the community from the vote, with some referring to the proposed city as a gerrymander.

Once the election was certified in August, the Mobile County Probate Judge ordered an enumeration, or census, of the citizens of the new municipality, in accordance with Alabama law. The enumeration was completed in late April 2011, and the city was declared incorporated by the Probate Judge on May 2, 2011. The Probate Judge set the date of the first municipal election to be June 28, 2011, to elect the mayor and the five at-large city council seats. The city of Mobile, upon the issuance of the order of incorporation, removed Semmes from its police, fire, and planning extraterritorial jurisdictions, and no longer provides any services or collects any taxes in the area.

Only one person, Judy Hale, filed with the Probate Judge to run for the office of Mayor, and, as such, was deemed elected without an election taking place. Likewise, only five citizens qualified to run for the five at-large City Council seats, and were subsequently deemed elected. The council members were Jerry Shirey, Dave Baker, Mary Calhoun, Phillip Dodd, and Teresa Bonner. They took the oath of office at the first Semmes City Council meeting on June 6, 2011.

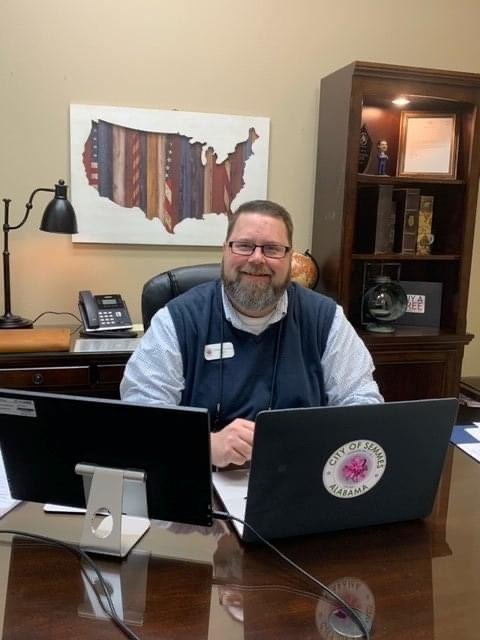
Mayor Brandon Van Hook of Semmes

The current mayor of Semmes is Brandon Van Hook, a local business owner. He was elected in August 2020 and replaced incumbent Mayor David Baker who only served one term.

== Geography ==
Semmes is located in west-central Mobile County. It is 11 miles (18 km) west of Prichard and 15 miles (24 km) northwest of downtown Mobile. U.S. Route 98 (Moffett Road) is the main highway through Semmes, leading southeast into Mobile and northwest 77 miles (124 km) to Hattiesburg, Mississippi.

According to the U.S. Census Bureau, the city of Semmes has a total area of 14.6 square miles (38 km^{2}), of which 0.04 square miles (0.10 km^{2}), or 0.24%, are water.

=== Climate ===
Semmes is on the central Gulf Coast and has a subtropical climate, which consists of warm, wet winters and very hot, very humid summers. Semmes is also vulnerable to hurricanes, which the area frequently experiences.

Month	Jan	Feb	Mar	Apr	May	Jun	Jul	Aug	Sep	Oct	Nov	Dec	Year
Avg high °F (°C)	60	64	71	79	85	90	91	91	87	80	70	63	77
Avg low °F (°C)	40	43	50	58	64	71	73	73	69	57	49	43	57
Rainfall (in inches)	4.8	5.5	6.4	4.5	5.7	5.0	6.9	7.0	5.9	2.9	4.1	5.3	64
Relative Humidity(%)	59.0	73.0	71.5	72.5	71.5	72.5	74.0	76.5	76.5	74.0	70.5	72.0	75.0
Source: Climate Zone

== Demographics ==
Historical population
Census	Pop.	Note	%±
2020	4,941		—
2025 (est.)	6,259	▲	26.7%
U.S. Decennial Census

=== Racial and ethnic composition ===
Semmes city, Alabama – Racial and ethnic composition Note: the US Census treats Hispanic/Latino as an ethnic category. This table excludes Latinos from the racial categories and assigns them to a separate category. Hispanics/Latinos may be of any race.
Race / Ethnicity (NH = Non-Hispanic)	Pop 2020	2020
White alone (NH)	3,828	77.47%
Black or African American alone (NH)	569	11.52%
Native American or Alaska Native alone (NH)	54	1.09%
Asian alone (NH)	41	0.83%
Native Hawaiian or Pacific Islander alone (NH)	1	0.02%
Other race alone (NH)	10	0.20%
Mixed race or Multiracial (NH)	215	4.35%
Hispanic or Latino (any race)	223	4.51%
Total	4,941	100.00%

=== 2020 census ===
As of the 2020 census, Semmes had a population of 4,941. The median age was 44.3 years. 21.5% of residents were under the age of 18 and 22.4% of residents were 65 years of age or older. For every 100 females there were 90.4 males, and for every 100 females age 18 and over there were 88.3 males age 18 and over.

74.7% of residents lived in urban areas, while 25.3% lived in rural areas.

There were 1,983 households in Semmes, including 1,446 families, of which 30.1% had children under the age of 18 living in them. Of all households, 48.9% were married-couple households, 16.6% were households with a male householder and no spouse or partner present, and 28.6% were households with a female householder and no spouse or partner present. About 25.7% of all households were made up of individuals and 15.1% had someone living alone who was 65 years of age or older.

There were 2,155 housing units, of which 8.0% were vacant. The homeowner vacancy rate was 2.9% and the rental vacancy rate was 6.7%.

== Education ==
=== Primary and secondary education ===
Semmes is a part of the Mobile County Public Schools system.

Secondary

- Mary G. Montgomery High School (9–12)
- Semmes Middle School (6–8)

Primary (all K–5)

- Semmes Elementary
- Allentown Elementary

Elementary schools serving nearby areas outside of the city limits:

- Elsie Collier Elementary School
- Tanner Williams Elementary School
- Turner Elementary

Private schools:

- Semmes First Baptist School

=== Higher education ===
Semmes is nearby to five tertiary institutions:

- Bishop State Community College
- Faulkner University, Mobile Campus
- Spring Hill College
- University of Mobile
- University of South Alabama

== Parks ==
=== Community park ===
The first community park in Semmes opened on February 3, 2007. The 10,400 sq ft (970 m^{2}) park was built adjacent to the Semmes Community Center at a cost of $600,000.

=== Semmes Heritage Park ===
Semmes School is the oldest continuously in-use school in the state of Alabama and is listed as an Alabama Historical Landmark. In 1994, a group of volunteers, former students, teachers and community citizens formed "Alumni & Friends of Semmes School, Inc." to preserve the 1902 one-room Semmes School and return it to its original location. The Mobile County School Board had planned to tear down the school when concerned citizens formed a group to save to school. The School Board gave a 99-year lease to the group and moved the school back to its original site. The school was restored to its 1902 status in 1998 by volunteers and donations, and continues to operate with volunteers as a hands-on 1900s school. Malone Chapel is a replica of Mt. Pleasant Church that was located on this exact spot. The chapel is rented for weddings and special events with the funds going towards operational expenses.

== Notable people ==
- Jake Peavy, MLB pitcher
- Ralph Staten, NFL player
