= 2025 Mobile mayoral election =

Election in Alabama, US

- August 26, 2025 (first round); September 23, 2025 (runoff)
Candidate	Spiro Cheriogotis	Barbara Drummond
First round	11,474; 27.7%	13,978; 33.7%
Runoff	25,106; 51.42%	23,715; 48.58%
Candidate	Paul Prine	Connie Hudson
First round	8,219; 19.8%	7,759; 18.7%
Runoff	Eliminated	Eliminated
- Cheriogotis: 70–80% 60–70% Drummond: 60–70% Cheriogotis: 80–90% 70–80% 60–70% 50–60% Drummond: 90–100% 80–90% 70–80% 60–70% 50–60% Tie: 50% Cheriogotis: 50–60% Drummond: 40–50% Hudson: 20–30% Cheriogotis: 70–80% 60–70% 50–60% 40–50% 30–40% Drummond: 70–80% 60–70% 50–60% 40–50% 30–40% 20–30% Prine: 30–40% Hudson: 30–40% 20–30%
Previous Mayor
Sandy Stimpson
Republican
Mayor
Spiro Cheriogotis
Republican

The 2025 Mobile mayoral election was held on August 26, 2025. The runoff election occurred on September 23 which determined which of the candidates Barbara Drummond or Spiro Cheriogotis will become the next mayor of Mobile, Alabama. Municipal elections in Mobile are officially nonpartisan.

Incumbent mayor Sandy Stimpson declined to run for re-election to a fourth term in office. Republican Spiro Cheriogotis won the runoff election, defeating Democratic state representative Barbara Drummond.

== Background ==
Sandy Stimpson was first elected mayor in 2013, defeating incumbent mayor and current state representative Sam Jones. Stimpson was reelected in 2017 and 2021. On September 25, 2024, Mobile mayor Sandy Stimpson publicly announced he would not seek reelection to a fourth term. Following Stimpson's announcement, speculation began on who would seek the seat. This was the first time in 20 years where no incumbent ran for mayor of Mobile.

== Candidates ==
=== Advanced to run-off ===
- Spiro Cheriogotis, former Mobile County district judge (2019–2025) (Republican)
- Barbara Drummond, state representative from the 103rd district (2014–present) (Democratic)

=== Eliminated ===
- Connie Hudson, Mobile County commissioner from the 2nd district (2010–present) and former Mobile city councilor from the 6th district (2001–2010) (Republican)
- Paul Prine, former Mobile Chief of Police

=== Withdrawn ===
- Lawrence Battiste, former Mobile Public Safety Director (Democratic) (endorsed Drummond)
- Jermaine Burrell, former city councilor from the 3rd district (2009–2012) (Democratic) (endorsed Drummond)
- Stephen Nodine, former Mobile County commissioner from the 2nd district (2004–2010), former Mobile city councilor, and convicted felon (Republican)
- Michael Woodard, IT professional (Republican)

=== Declined ===
- Jerry Carl, former U.S. representative from Alabama's 1st congressional district (2021–2025) (Republican)
- Adline Clarke, state representative from the 97th district (2013–present) (Democratic) (endorsed Drummond)
- Joel Daves, city councilor from the 5th district (2013–present) (Republican)
- Cory Penn, city councilor from the 1st district (2021–present)
- Chris Pringle, state representative from the 101st district (2014–present) and candidate for Alabama's 1st congressional district in 2020 (Republican)
- Ben Reynolds, city councilor from the 4th district (2021–present)
- C.J. Small, president of the Mobile city council (2021–present) from the 3rd district (2012–present) (Democratic)
- Sandy Stimpson, incumbent mayor (2013–present) (Republican) (endorsed Cheriogotis)
- Margie Wilcox, state representative from the 104th district (2014–present) (Republican)

== General election ==
=== Endorsements ===
Spiro Cheriogotis

Local officials

- Sandy Stimpson, incumbent mayor of Mobile (2013–present)
Barbara Drummond

U.S. senators

- Doug Jones, Alabama (2018–2021)

State legislators

- Adline Clarke, state representative from the 97th district (2013–present)

Local officials

- Lawrence Battiste, former Mobile Public Safety Director (2021–2023) and former mayoral candidate
- Justin Bibb, mayor of Cleveland, Ohio (2022–present)
- Jermaine Burrell, former city councilor from the 3rd district (2009–2012) and former mayoral candidate

Organizations

- Democratic Mayors Association
- Southern Poverty Law Center Action Fund
- The Collective PAC
Connie Hudson

County officials

- Sam Cochran, Mobile County Sheriff (2006–2022)

=== Debates and forums ===
2025 Mobile mayoral election debates and forums
No.	Date and location	Host	Moderator	Participants						
P Participant A Absent I Invited NYD Not yet declared W Withdrawn										
P Participant A Absent I Invited NYD Not yet declared W Withdrawn				Battiste	Burrell	Cheriogotis	Drummond	Hudson	Nodine	Prine
1	February 12, 2025; Mobile	West Mobile Republican Women's Club	Unknown	P	NYD	A	NYD	P	P	NYD
2	May 6, 2025; Mobile	Cottage Hill Baptist Church	None	P	P	P	P (Note: Drummond participated in the forum virtually.)	P	P	P
3	May 20, 2025; Mobile	Mobile Midtown and Downtown Historic Districts	Unknown	P	P	P	P	P	P	P
4	August 4, 2025; Mobile	WKRG-TV	Peter Albrecht	W	W	P	P	P	W	P

=== Results ===
2025 Mobile mayoral election
Candidate	Votes	%
Barbara Drummond	13,897	33.74
Spiro Cheriogotis	11,389	27.65
Paul Prine	8,186	19.87
Connie Hudson	7,722	18.75
Total votes	41,192	100.00

== Runoff election ==
=== Post-primary endorsements ===
Barbara Drummond

Executive branch officials

- Pete Buttigieg, former U.S. Secretary of Transportation (2021–2025)
- Kamala Harris, former Vice President of the United States (2021–2025)

U.S. senators

- Cory Booker, New Jersey (2013–present)
- Raphael Warnock, Georgia (2021–present)

U.S. representatives

- Sanford Bishop, GA-02 (1993–present)

Local officials

- C.J. Small, Mobile city council president (2022–present) from the 3rd district (2012–present)
- Randall Woodfin, Mayor of Birmingham (2017–present)

Party officials

- Ken Martin, Chair of the Democratic National Committee (2025–present)

Labor unions

- Communications Workers of America Local 3907
- Southwest Alabama AFL-CIO

Organizations

- Democratic National Committee
Spiro Cheriogotis

Local officials

- Mike Dow, former mayor of Mobile (1989–2005)
- Hoss Mack, former Baldwin County Sheriff (2006–2024)
- Ben Reynolds, city councilor from the 4th district (2021–present)
- Josh Wood, city councilor from the 6th district (2023–present)

Individuals

- A.J. McCarron, professional football player

Labor unions

- Mobile Police Benevolent Association and Mobile County Law Enforcement Association
- International Association of Sheet Metal, Air, Rail and Transportation Workers Local 441

Organizations

- Mobile Area Association of Realtors
- Mobile Area Retired Fire Fighters Association

=== Results ===
Mobile mayoral run-off election results
Candidate	Votes	%
Spiro Cheriogotis	25,106	51.42%
Barbara Drummond	23,715	48.58%
Total votes	48,821	100.00

== See also ==
- List of mayors of Mobile, Alabama
