= Mary Zoghby =

American politician (1938–2025)

Member of the Alabama Legislature
- In office 1978–1994
- Preceded by: Nat Sonnier
- Succeeded by: Chris Pringle

Personal details
- Born: July 23, 1938 Gulfport, Mississippi, US
- Died: April 12, 2025 (aged 86)
- Party: Democratic
- Education: University of South Alabama

Mary Elizabeth Stephens Zoghby (July 23, 1938 – April 12, 2025) was an American nonprofit executive and Democratic Party politician in Alabama. She represented Mobile, Alabama in the Alabama Legislature for fifteen years (1978–1994).

== Background ==
Born Mary Elizabeth Stephens in Gulfport, Mississippi during the Great Depression, she had a sister Patricia Stephens and graduated from St. John's High School in Gulfport. In November, 1961, she married Mitchell P. Zoghby (1926–2003), one of the twin sons of Alex Zoghby, and whose grandmother Mrs. M. Salloum was from Gulfport. The Zoghby family was well known in the Mobile area for department stores which her husband's paternal grandfather Kaleel Zoghby and his sons had founded after emigrating from Lebanon via Canada and New York City, including one in Prichard, Alabama established in 1935. The Mitchell Zoghbys lived in Mobile and raised a family; Mary Zoghby later attended the newly established University of South Alabama. A woman with a similar name (Mary Jo Zoghby) was a relative through their husbands' family, married to Air Force veteran and lawyer (then Mobile County judge) Michael E. Zoghby (1933–1995).

Zoghby died April 12, 2025, at the age of 86.

== Career ==
Mary Zoghby had a career as an advertising executive and was active in a variety of charities, including the Historic Mobile Preservation Society, Theatre Guild, and her Roman Catholic church. Aligned with the Democratic Party, she had a seat on the state Democratic Executive Committee in April 1978, when she announced she would challenge incumbent Nathaniel G. ("Nat") Sonnier for a seat in the Alabama House of Representatives. The previous year, Sonnier had allied with embattled Mobile School Board President Dan C. Alexander and introduced legislation requiring educational competency testing, but which did not resolve a long running school desegregation lawsuit, Birdie Mae Davis v. Board of School Commissioners of Mobile County, which had resulted in numerous hearings and orders by U.S. District Judge Daniel Holcombe Thomas (and higher courts) before his retirement in 1971, and would continue under his successor U.S. District Judge William Brevard Hand until 1997.

Zoghby won the September primary and was unopposed in the general election, as well as her first re-election contest in 1982. In 1985, Zoghby was the chief sponsor of legislation that permitted Mobile to switch from an at-large 3-commissioner system of city government, to a mayor/council form of government, but which also required that Mobile's budget be balanced and gave the mayor line-item veto authority. Voter adoption of the mayor/council form of government helped resolve two decades of litigation involving black voter suppression, which had reached the U.S. Supreme Court in Mobile v. Bolden (1980) before the black plaintiffs found a 1909 "smoking-gun" letter from Congressman Frederick George Bromberg before a scheduled retrial before U.S. District Judge Virgil Pittman.

After redistricting in 1983, Zoghby won election from the 97th district with 75.98% of the vote; won her fourth term in 1986 without any opponent, and easily won re-election to a fifth term in 1990 with 99.75% of the vote. However, following another census reapportionment, in 1994, Zoghby was moved to the 101st district, where the long-term Republican incumbent Ken Kvalheim had been unseated in the Republican primary. However, Zoghby lost to Republican Chris Pringle in 1994, winning only 38.68% of the vote to his 61.26%.

That proved the end of her political career, but the beginning of her career directing local non-profit institutions. In 2016, Zoghby retired after two decades of service with the Boys and Girls Clubs of South Alabama, including six years as its Resource Development Director and 14 years as the executive director, and the Mobile County government issued a resolution of gratitude. Meanwhile, Zoghby was named Mobile's First Lady in 1986 and Mobilian of the Year in 1996. She also received the Liberty Bell Award, and served on numerous charitable boards, including AltaPointe Health Systems, Catholic Social Services, the Mobile Lions Club, the Children's Policy Council and the Mobile Area Chamber of Commerce Local Government Services Air Service Task Force.

In 2019, Mobile mayor Sandy Stimpson sued the Mobile City Council in a budget dispute, alleging violations of what Mobilians had long called the "Zoghby Act." In 2020, the Mobile County sheriff attempted to rescind the act's supermajority provision with respect to annexation and other ordinances. Also in 2019, Zoghby's Department Store closed, although a school uniform company founded by a niece remained in business.
