= Arthur R. Outlaw =

American politician

105th Mayor of Mobile
- In office 1985–1989
- Preceded by: Lambert C. Mims
- Succeeded by: Mike Dow

92nd Mayor of Mobile
- In office 1967–1968
- Preceded by: Joseph N. Langan
- Succeeded by: Lambert C. Mims

Public Safety Commissioner of Mobile
- In office 1965–1969
- Preceded by: George E. McNally
- Succeeded by: Robert B. Doyle

Finance Commissioner of Mobile
- In office 1985
- Preceded by: Gary A. Greenough
- Succeeded by: office abolished

Personal details
- Born: September 8, 1926 Mobile County, Alabama, U.S.
- Died: November 5, 2000 (aged 74) Mobile, Alabama, U.S.
- Party: Democratic Party in his early career; then switched to the Republican Party
- Spouse: Dorothy Smith
- Children: Robbie, Karen and Gay Outlaw
- Education: Spring Hill College

Arthur Robert Outlaw (September 8, 1926 – November 5, 2000) was a Mobile area businessman, community leader, and politician, who served as Public Safety Commissioner (1965-1969) on the City Commission, and co-terminous as President of the Commission and Mayor of Mobile in 1967-1968. At that time, the mayor's title was co-extensive with the presidency of the City Commission, and was rotated for one-year terms among the three city commissioners. In 1984 he was elected as Finance Commissioner.

In 1985 city voters approved a referendum to adopt a mayor-council form of government. In new elections Outlaw was elected directly as mayor, the first person to do so since 1911, when the city had adopted the commission system. He promoted investment in downtown Mobile to stimulate redevelopment. After leaving office, he continued to be active in political, civic and church affairs, serving as chairman of the Alabama Republican Party in 1989-1991 and in several civic positions.

== Early life, education and career ==
Born on a farm near Mobile, Alabama, in 1926, Outlaw moved with his parents and family into the city when he was 14. It was becoming a center of defense-related jobs at the shipyards as the United States began to respond to World War II in Europe, stimulating other businesses as well. The city became crowded with thousands of new workers recruited to the defense jobs.

Outlaw had attended Catholic schools and in the city studied at McGill Institute, before graduating from a public high school in 1945. He enlisted in the U. S. Air Force Cadet Program, serving for two years during the last months of World War II and afterward. After returning to Mobile, he attended the University of Alabama for one year and completed a business degree at Spring Hill College.

In 1951 Outlaw started working as an auditor in his father's business, Morrison's Restaurants. This business was started by J. A. Morrison with one cafeteria in Mobile in 1920 and was the first to introduce the cafeteria concept in the South. By 1950, Morrison's had 17 locations in Alabama, Louisiana, Georgia, and Florida, with seven in the latter state, and it had become synonymous with Southern casual dining. Outlaw and his father continued to develop the business together during the next two decades, when it became the largest cafeteria chain in the nation. The younger Outlaw advanced to serve as the vice-chairman of the board and director of Morrison Restaurants, Inc.

== Political career ==
Outlaw entered politics in 1965, and was elected as Public Safety Commissioner of the city of Mobile, serving into 1969. The government had three non-partisan commissioners elected at-large, each for specific responsibilities. In addition, they rotated the position of President of the Commission/Mayor for one-year terms during their service on the commission.

From the late 1960s through the 1970s and early 80s, politics in Mobile changed as barriers were removed to voting by African Americans following passage of the Voting Rights Act of 1965. They represented more than 30% of the city's population and supported the Democratic Party, which on the national level had supported their drive for civil rights.

After several years in business, Outlaw returned to politics, being elected as Finance Commissioner of the city in 1984. While running as a non-partisan, Outlaw had shifted from the Democratic Party of his youth to the Republican Party. He was part of city negotiations with the state legislature over potential changes to the city form of government.

This had resulted from a suit by Wiley Bolden with the support the Non-Partisan Voters League in the late 1970s, challenging the at-large election of city commissioners, which was filed under the Voting Rights Act of 1965. It challenged the at-large system for suppressing minority voters, and reached the United States Supreme Court, which decided Mobile v. Bolden (1980) and sent the case back to U.S.District Judge Virgil Pittman for a retrial, shortly before which the plaintiffs found a 1909 letter written by Congressman Frederick G. Bromberg which seemed a "smoking gun".

To settle the dispute, state rep Mary Zoghby introduced legislation which permitted a voter referendum in May 1985, at which city voters approved a change to a mayor-council form of city government. In July 1985 citywide elections were held for mayor, to be elected at-large, and the seven members of the city council, all non-partisan positions. Outlaw won the direct election to a full four-year term as mayor, the first person directly elected to the office since 1911, when the city had established the commission form of government. The seven city council members were elected from single-member districts of roughly equal populations. That year three African Americans were elected to the city council; it was the first time any had been elected to city office.

As mayor, Outlaw was committed to investment in downtown Mobile to stimulate redevelopment and attract new businesses. His administration proposed construction of a convention center in 1987. It was part of a 15-year plan for redevelopment. Built on the waterfront of the Mobile River after Outlaw left office, the convention center has been a catalyst for related development, and ultimately named in Outlaw's honor.

Outlaw was defeated for re-election in 1989 by Mike Dow. Dow helped carry out some of Outlaw's vision for downtown Mobile, including construction of the convention center.

Outlaw was chairman of the Alabama Republican Party from 1989-1991. He also continued to be active in civic and church affairs. He contributed to Catholic charities and helped support Spring Hill College and other interests in the area.

Outlaw died in 2000.

== Legacy and honors ==
- 1998, he was elected to the Alabama Business Hall of Fame.
- The Arthur R. Outlaw Mobile Convention Center was named in his honor.
- The Recreation Center at Spring Hill College was named for him.
- In recognition of his contributions to the Archdiocese of Mobile, he was made a Knight of St. Gregory.
- 2003, he was inducted to McGill-Toolen Hall of Fame at his former high school.

Preceded by George E. McNally	Public Safety Commissioner of Mobile; 1965–1969	Succeeded by Robert B. Doyle
Preceded by Joseph N. Langan	92nd Mayor of Mobile; 1967–1968	Succeeded by Lambert C. Mims
Preceded by Gary A. Greenough	Finance Commissioner of Mobile; 1985	Succeeded by office abolished
Preceded by Lambert C. Mims	105th Mayor of Mobile; 1985–1989	Succeeded by Mike Dow
