= Joseph N. Langan =

American politician (1912–2004)

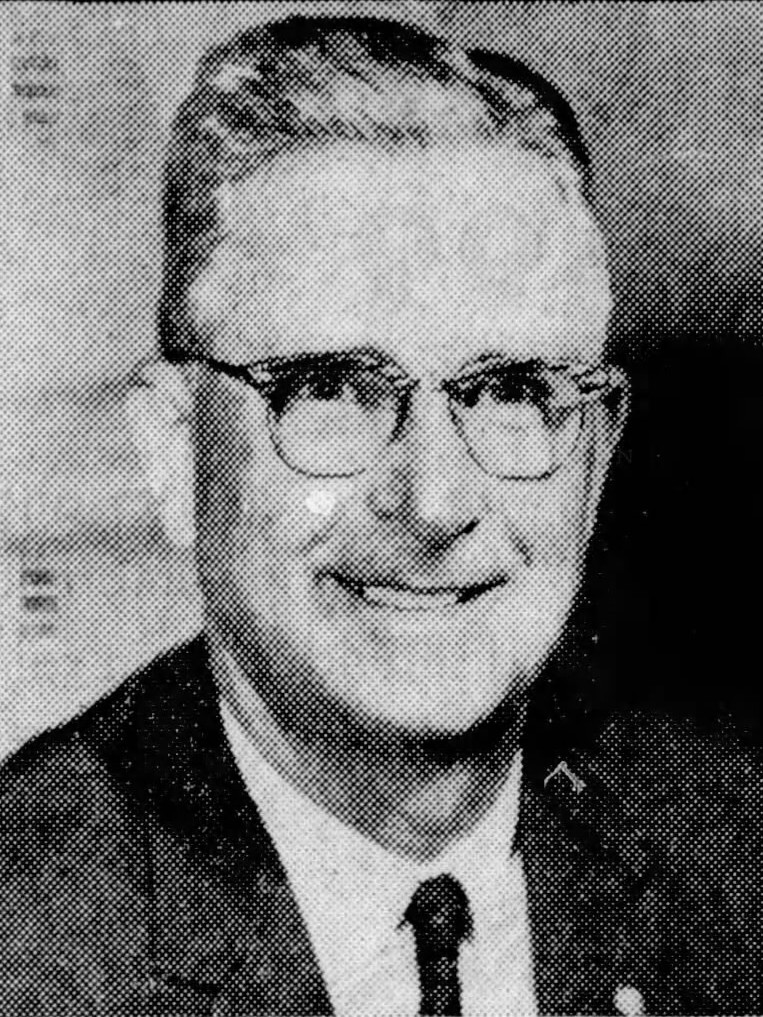
- Langan c. 1972

Member of the Alabama Legislature
- In office 1939–1941

Member of the Alabama Senate
- In office 1946–1951

Finance Commissioner of Mobile
- In office 1953–1969
- Preceded by: Charles A. Baumhauer
- Succeeded by: Joseph A. Bailey

Personal details
- Born: Joseph Nicholas Langan; March 11, 1912 Mobile, Alabama, U.S.
- Died: November 2, 2004 (aged 92) Mobile, Alabama, U.S.
- Party: Democratic
- Spouse: Maude Adele Holcombe
- Awards: Bronze Star

Military service
- Allegiance: United States
- Branch/service: United States Army; Alabama National Guard
- Years of service: 1931–1952
- Rank: Colonel
- Unit: infantry
- Battles/wars: World War II; Korean War

Joseph Nicholas Langan (March 11, 1912 – November 2, 2004) was an American lawyer, soldier and Democratic politician who served in both houses of the Alabama legislature and became known for his progressive policies in Mobile, Alabama following his military service in World War II. After becoming one of only two legislators to oppose the Boswell Amendment to restrict African-American suffrage, Langan failed to win re-election to the Alabama Senate. Undeterred, Langan won election and re-election to the Mobile City Commission, his native city's three-member governing body. Thus he also served several one-year terms as Mayor of Mobile, an office rotated among the three commissioners.

Langan opposed the Dixiecrat movement in the Democratic Party, and became a leading moderate voice in his state, working to extend voting rights for African Americans (who had been essentially disenfranchised since the turn of the century). As a Mobile commissioner, Langan also expanded the city's tax base, including through annexation, and helped found the Mobile Museum of Art.

== Early and family life ==
Joseph Nicholas Langan was born in Mobile, Alabama on March 11, 1912. His father, David Langan, had served for several years as Mobile's tax collector, until 1911. David Langan and his brother then ran a men's clothing store in downtown Mobile. When a hurricane devastated Mobile and destroyed the store in 1916, the Langan family moved to Semmes, a small community in north Mobile County. After World War I, the Langans returned to Mobile and opened a grocery store on Espejo Street.

Raised in a devout Catholic family, Joseph Langan and his siblings attended St. Mary's parochial school before Joseph transferred to Murphy High School, graduating in 1931. That same year, he joined the Alabama National Guard, while clerking as an apprentice to his uncle, Vincent B. McAleer. At night, he studied for the Alabama bar exam, which he passed in 1936; he would ultimately become the last attorney in Mobile to be admitted without going to law school. His further education came through the National Guard and U.S. Army, and finally, Spring Hill College after most of his military service. He graduated in 1951, although he also taught government at the school the previous two terms, and would later serve on its board of trustees.

== Personal life ==
Langan married Maude Adele Holcombe in 1943; the couple had no children.

== Career ==
Following his admission to the bar, Langan continued to work for his uncle, and also became the city attorney for Chickasaw, helping incorporate the city.

=== Early military service ===
Langan had enlisted in the Alabama National Guard in 1931, and was sent to officer candidate school in 1939. He received his first officer commission on December 21, 1939, as a second lieutenant. Called into the U.S. Army during World War II, he was promoted to captain in November 1940, major in July 1942, lieutenant colonel in February 1943 and colonel in December 1945. During the latter years of the war, Langan served with the Thirty-first Dixie Division as a chief of staff in the South Pacific during campaigns in the Philippines and New Guinea, for which he was awarded a Bronze Star with oak leaf cluster.

=== Alabama legislator ===
In 1939, Langan ran successfully for a seat in the Alabama House of Representatives. The 27-year-old politician worked to improve Alabama's voting laws (overseeing the installation of voting machines in Mobile) and adoption of a merit system for promoting public employees. His military obligations cut short his term in 1941 as America entered World War II.

During his wartime service, Langan worked with black soldiers and officers, which opened his eyes to their issues as well as potential. Growing up in the segregated South, Langan had learned to observe the color line, even if he and his family did not always adhere to the status quo. While in the National Guard, Langan witnessed the demeaning effects of segregation on black soldiers and became determined to speak out against such injustices. When he returned to Mobile after the war, he found the city much changed (population having more than doubled since 1920, including many from other parts of Alabama and Mississippi). The shipbuilding industry had grown due to wartime contracts, and rapid industrialization also included expansion of the Army Air Force base at Brookley Field which became the major Air Materiel Command supply base in the southeastern U.S. At the same time, social tensions and competition during the war had included incidents of racial violence in 1943 and 1944, particularly since President Franklin D. Roosevelt's administration required defense contractors to hire and promote workers without racial discrimination. Moreover, in 1944, the U.S. Supreme Court had issued Smith v. Allwright, a Texas case but which also effectively outlawed the whites-only primary customary in Alabama. Nonetheless, that year, twelve qualified and registered black Mobilians were turned away as they attempted to vote, as photographers for national magazines documented.

=== Postwar Alabama politics ===
In 1946, Langan returned to civilian life and the political arena. Elected to the Alabama State Senate as the only senator representing Mobile County, any new piece of legislation that affected the county had to win his approval before going forward to the legislature as a whole. Langan used his position to improve the lives of both white and black Mobilians. For example, although consideration of recent federal judicial decisions in Texas voting rights cases led Alabama's Democratic party to allow black voters in its primary, and the county's population was approximately 1/3 black, only 275 blacks and 19,000 whites were registered to vote in Mobile County in January 1946. The number of registered black voters increased to 691 before the primary, but the state Democratic Executive Committee and registration officials only allowed a specified number of blacks to register on a given day. Langan also became an early supporter for equalizing the salaries of white and black public schoolteachers, who taught in a segregated system, and shocked some by proposing that part of a beer tax increase the Mobile School Board sought be used to rectify pay and workload disparities.

Langan supported the candidacy of James E. Folsom for governor and became one of Folsom's leading allies in the state senate. Langan also became one of the strongest opponents of the Boswell Amendment, a state constitutional amendment aimed at suppressing the (already limited) black vote by requiring new voters at registration to demonstrate understanding of the U.S. Constitution to a (white) registrar's satisfaction before being allowed to register. Named for state senator E.C. (Bud) Boswell of Geneva, it was the brainchild of Gessner McCorvey, chairman of the State Democratic Committee and a leading lawyer who also served as trustee of the University of Alabama and president of the Alabama Bar Association. The amendment allowed white registrars to use subjective standards to deny applications of new black voters. Langan became one of only two state senators to vote against the amendment, also opposed by Governor Folsom, Alabama's two U.S. Senators and labor unions in the state.

His progressive stance earned the support of civil rights leaders such as John L. LeFlore, a U.S. postal carrier in Mobile who had led the local branch of the National Association for the Advancement of Colored People (NAACP) since 1925. Understanding that the local registrar's office was the key to enable registration for African Americans, Langan urged Folsom to appoint Lt. Col. E.J. "Gunny" Gonzales (an Air Force Judge Advocate General officer who had been an athletic star and graduate of McGill Institute High School) to a vacant seat on the Mobile County Board of Registrars. Gonzales likewise opposed the Boswell Amendment, which a majority (54%) of state voters approved in 1946, overriding the voters in Birmingham and Mobile (which rejected it). Gonzales would later relate his experience on the Board of Registrars for the ten African American plaintiffs in Davis et al. v. Schnell et al. who with the assistance of Chicago lawyer George N. Leighton sued the Board for discrimination based on its practices following the amendment's enactment statewide. A three-judge panel in federal district court declared the Boswell Amendment unconstitutional, for violating the Fifteenth Amendment of the U.S. Constitution. The U.S. Supreme Court summarily affirmed in 1949.

In 1949, segregationists in the Alabama Legislature attempted to pass another version of the Boswell Amendment on the last day of the session. Langan and three other senators led a 23-hour filibuster to defeat the new bill. However, the following year, Langan lost his Senate seat to fellow lawyer Thomas Johnston, a Dixiecrat with strong financial backing from Old Guard segregationists determined to oust Langan.

After his electoral defeat, Langan accepted another commission from the U.S. Army. Assigned to Korea during the Korean War, he was released from further military service on October 22, 1952.

=== Mobile City Commissioner ===
In 1953, Langan returned to Mobile and politics, running for city office on a platform of economic development and municipal improvements. He defeated 20-year incumbent Charles A. Baumhauer for the position of Finance Commissioner, one of the three seats on the Mobile City Commission. Fellow progressives Henry R. Luscher and Charles F. Hackmeyer, also endorsed by the Citizens Committee for Good Government, won the other two seats. The three commissioners were each elected at large to four-year terms to supervise specific city departments; they also took turns serving one-year terms as mayor during their tenure. Numerous African Americans who remembered Langan's efforts to defeat the Boswell Amendment supported him, as did many white liberals. During his first term, Langan sought to create a biracial coalition of citizens to discuss Mobile's racial problems. Since the Mobile Press Register and his fellow commissioners publicly opposed it, Langan first called a town meeting, and when it had a positive response, the committee of 17 whites and 13 blacks was created. It actually became a conservative force, later criticized by a new generation of civil rights leaders as promoting a "kinder, gentler" segregation.

In the 1957 election, Langan faced E. C. Barnard, leader of the local Ku Klux Klan. In this campaign season, the Non-Partisan Voters League (NPVL) (and its leader John LeFlore) introduced the use of "pink sheets", informational leaflets endorsing certain candidates printed on pink paper. The League's endorsement, combined with Langan's wide appeal among white voters, swept him to an easy victory over Barnard. Voters also passed a $3 million bond issue and re-elected his fellow commissioners Luscher and Hackmeyer. The city's growth boom during the World War had continued as the Korean War commenced because of its shipbuilding industry, airbase and the largest port on the northern Gulf Coast. Oil wells came on line near Citronelle; chemical plants were built; Mobile also became a leader in pulp and paper production; and Alabama Power built a new steam plant to meet growing demand. However, its infrastructure lagged, particularly schools, hospitals and recreational facilities, in part because of a clause in the decades-old state constitution restricting government indebtedness. Mobile dedicated a large new park west of the city (ultimately named after Langan) in 1957, and built enough public schools by the following year to end double sessions in classrooms.

In 1961, Luscher and Hackmeyer faced opponents from the right. Each was defeated in a runoff election, Luscher by George E. McNally (the first Republican to win city office since Reconstruction) and Hackmeyer by Charles S. Trimmier, who played the race card. During the previous year, the Southern Institute of Management released a study that revealed that unlike New Orleans and Atlanta, which became regional manufacturing and distribution centers, Mobile lagged behind in having only three department stores and one major suburban shopping mall (the Springdale Plaza-Bel Air Mall) and a rapidly declining downtown. Moreover, despite the recent highway construction, the report noted that deficiencies in its civilian airport limited Mobile's tourism potential, even if Brookley Field employed as many civilians as all local manufacturers combined. The study also noted that most towns its size already had an art gallery and municipal auditorium, while Mobile was only planning such through its United Arts Council. Long before white flight from desegregation, the report noted its parochial and private schools were among Mobile's greatest assets, as were its "stabilized" race relations.

Indeed, throughout the early 1960s, as civil rights demonstrations erupted in Montgomery, Birmingham, and Selma, Mobile remained comparatively quiet. Langan continued to work with activists such as John LeFlore and Spring Hill College professor Father Albert Foley. Spring Hill College had admitted black students the year of the first Brown v. Board of Education decision, and Mobile had hired its first black policeman in 1953 shortly after Langan took office, so that a decade later the police force included 26 African Americans. The municipal golf course and public library were desegregated in 1961; two years later segregated seating on city buses ended, and black drivers were soon hired. Under a court order from Judge Daniel Holcombe Thomas, Murphy High School, Langan's alma mater, became the first Alabama public school to integrate (in the fall 1963), although a white citizens league caused trouble two days later and Langan and fellow commissioner George McNally lectured 54 students arrested for brawling about the need to follow the law. Thus, at a time when the state law required racial segregation in public facilities, Langan achieved moderate concessions in Mobile, so that the Wall Street Journal in July 1963 published an article headlined, "An Alabama City Builds Racial Peace as Strife Increases Elsewhere".

During this period, Langan and fellow commissioners fostered economic growth in Mobile. Langan arranged to have the new interstate highways meet outside of the city center, then arranged for growth at their intersection and annexed the new suburbs. In 1956, the commissioners expanded the city by annexing what had been suburban areas (Spring Hill and Cottage Hill). This dramatically increased Mobile's size and the city also implemented its first sales tax. I-65 ran miles west of the historic downtown and it linked with I-10 southwest of the city center. The Springdale Plaza shopping center opened in 1959 where I-65 crossed Airport Boulevard, and Bell Air Mall soon opened nearby. By Mobile's 250th anniversary in 1962, responding to the SIM criticism, Mobile passed a $6 million bond issue to construct the municipal auditorium, and actively recruited for its chemical industry. Also, its Baptist churches began construction on what became the University of Mobile, and Frederick Whiddon and local politicians spurred what became the University of South Alabama.

In 1964 and 1965 national civil rights legislation passed which ended de jure segregation. The Kennedy and Johnson administrations also began enforcing constitutional voting rights through federal oversight and enforcement. African Americans were able to register and vote in Alabama in the ensuing years, as discriminatory barriers to voter registration were forced down.

However, economic storm clouds grew over Mobile. In late 1962, Frank Boykin, its powerful and colorful U.S. Congressman for two decades, lost his seat when census results reduced Alabama's delegation. While often criticized on moral grounds (and with an old corruption conviction reversed on appeal and an upcoming trial), Boykin had been known for "bringing in the pork", including expanding Brookley Field during and after World War II, as the Department of Defense closed bases in Tennessee and other states north of Alabama. On November 19, 1964, the Department of Defense announced a progressive reduction in employment at Brookley Field, and its eventual closure. It became the largest base closure in U.S. history, and laid off workers represented 20% of all U.S. civilian jobs ever lost in base shutdowns. Some believed Brookley's closure retaliation by President Lyndon B. Johnson for Alabamians' election of Republican Jack Edwards as Boykin's successor in the election two weeks earlier, as well as Barry Goldwater carrying the state (despite LBJ's nationwide landslide). Mobilians responded by creating Task Force 200, which met its goal of attracting $200 million in industrial investment in only 3.5 instead of five years. Moreover, Congressman Edwards soon secured a huge public works project, the Tennessee-Tombigbee Waterway, which also helped make up the economic losses associated with Brookley's closure.

In 1965, as school desegregation issues festered, Langan faced his first real opposition, from local businessman Joseph Bailey, despite the openings of the long-awaited municipal auditorium on July 9, 1964, and of Battleship Memorial Park (to host the USS Alabama (BB-60) decommissioned and towed from Seattle) on January 9, 1965. Lambert C. Mims defeated Trimmier and Arthur R. Outlaw defeated McNally, both with majority support among white voters and minimal support in the black community. Bailey's ties in the white community undermined Langan's white support, to the extent that he for the first time failed to win a majority in any of the city's predominantly white wards. The Mobile Press Register and white candidates by then referred to "bloc wards", alluding to support in the black community generated through the pink sheets. Unlike Mims and Outlaw, Langan faced a runoff, in which he defeated Bailey by fewer than 1,500 votes, in part through support within the black community despite the white backlash.

After 1966, the Non-Partisan Voters League faced a challenge from the left, when the Neighborhood Organized Workers (NOW) was founded by Noble Beasley and others from a younger generation of African-American activists. They had grown tired of the moderate politics of black leaders such as John LeFlore, especially the slow pace of change, and were willing to use not only demonstrations and picketing, but even violence and threats (LeFlore's house was firebombed on June 28, 1967). Several times, NOW brought Stokely Carmichael to press its desegregation demands. NOW alsocriticized Langan and the other Mobile commissioners for their slow response to problems in the black community. Its leaders pushed to have more blacks elected to and hired in government. They believed that the relationship between Langan and LeFlore was an outdated form of paternalism. When in 1966 Langan appointed LeFlore as the first black member of the Mobile Housing Board, NOW activists felt confirmed in their views.

In 1968, Mobile like other cities experienced riots after news of the assassination of Dr. Martin Luther King Jr. NOW organized rallies and a 16-month boycott of white businesses before reaching an agreement to hire black sales clerks. As the 1969 election neared, NOW organized a "no vote" campaign among African American voters. LeFlore attempted to fend off the voting boycott. Mims faced no serious opposition and Outlaw handpicked Robert B. Doyle as his successor. Bailey again challenged Langan, and this time became more overt in race-baiting, running a series of ads with photos of Langan with LeFlore, as well as suggesting the incumbent commissioner was 'too friendly' with the civil rights leader. When votes were tallied, Langan again failed to carry any majority white ward, and combined with NOW's boycott in the black wards; Bailey won by more than 1,000 votes. Langan used the remainder of his time as Commissioner to appoint several black residents to city positions, so the Municipal Auditorium had a black assistant manager as well as three African Americans on its board before Langan departed.

Langan would never again hold public office, although his successor Bailey would fail to win re-election four years later because of a scandal concerning the auditorium's management. One analyst noticed that white politicians no longer courted the black vote and an overwhelming majority of whites refused to vote for black candidates. In early 1973, Noble Beasley and his NOW associates Doc Finley and Frederick Douglas Richardson were jailed on charges of extortion, distribution of heroin and income tax evasion.

=== Later years ===
After his election defeat, Langan returned to his law practice, as well as helped found the Mobile Museum of Art. Desegregation litigation continued through the 1970s, particularly the Birdie Mae Davis school desegregation case. In 1975, litigation began which stopped the at-large voting practices in Mobile city and county that had diluted black votes, in Brown v. Moore and Bolden v. City of Mobile. The former dragged on until 1984 and while the latter settled not long after the U.S. Supreme Court decision in Mobile v. Bolden, although the legislature then needed to pass mayor/council enabling legislation and voters needed to pass a referendum so at-large representation only ended in 1985. Langan testified for the plaintiffs in Bolden v. City of Mobile, in which the Non-Partisan Voters' League challenged Mobile's at-large election system for City Commission as inherently discriminatory. Blacks comprised 36% of the city's population but, because candidates for each commission seat had to gain a majority of voters, the minority was prevented from ever electing a candidate of its choice.

After a decade-long legal battle (ultimately including discovery of a 1909 legislative letter promoting the at-large system for excluding blacks), legislative approval and a May 1985 referendum, Mobile's form of government changed to a mayor-council system. Thus only the mayor is elected at-large, and city council members are elected from single-member districts. The number of districts were seven, each with roughly equal populations.

Langan ran for the seat of the newly created District Two in the municipal council elections held in July 1985, The district had a 70-percent African-American majority. Charles Tunstall, a local minister, defeated Langan and became one of three African Americans elected that year to the city council, the first elected blacks ever in city government. The seven new city council members took office in October 1985.

Langan remained active in civic affairs in Mobile for the rest of his life, particularly in the local Exchange Club and various Catholic charities. He served on the boards of Spring Hill College, Mobile Mental Health, Saint Mary's Home, the Mobile Theatre Guild and Mobile County Hospital. Langan had been named "Mobilian of the Year" in 1957 and in 1989 received the NAACP's Freedom Award. He also received the Mobile Bar Association's Liberty Bell Award and the Alfred F. Delchamps Jr. Award from the Mobile Area Chamber of Commerce.

== Death and legacy ==
In February 2003, Langan suffered a stroke and never fully recovered. He died in an assisted living facility on election day, November 2, 2004, at the age of 92, survived by his widow and one brother. He is entombed in the Holy Sepulcher Mausoleum in Mobile's historic Catholic cemetery.

In his lifetime, Mobile named its largest municipal park in his honor.

In August 2009, the city of Mobile dedicated Unity Point Park, a small public space located at the historic boundary between the white and black sections of town. The park features a large bronze statue of Joseph Langan and John LeFlore standing together, to honor their efforts in securing equality for all Mobilians.

Preceded by Charles A. Baumhauer	Finance Commissioner of Mobile; 1953–1969	Succeeded by Joseph A. Bailey
Preceded by Charles F. Hackmeyer	81st Mayor of Mobile; 1955–1956	Succeeded by Henry R. Luscher
Preceded by Henry R. Luscher	83rd Mayor of Mobile; 1957–1958	Succeeded by Henry R. Luscher
Preceded by Henry R. Luscher	85th Mayor of Mobile; 1959–1960	Succeeded by Henry R. Luscher
Preceded by Charles S. Trimmier	89th Mayor of Mobile; 1963–1964	Succeeded by Charles S. Trimmier
Preceded by Charles S. Trimmier	91st Mayor of Mobile; 1965–1967	Succeeded by Arthur R. Outlaw
