= Davis v. Board of School Commissioners of Mobile County =

- Supreme Court of the United States

Argued October 13–14, 1970 Decided April 20, 1971
- Full case name: Birdie Mae Davis et al., Appellants, v. Board of School Commissioners of Mobile County, Alabama, et al., Appellees.
- Citations: 402 U.S. 33 (more) 402 U.S. 33, 91 S. Ct. 1289
- Argument: Oral argument

Holding
- Courts cannot consider portions of a metropolitan area in isolation from the rest of the school system for desegregation purposes, and they must adequately considering the possible use of all available techniques to achieve the maximum amount of practicable desegregation.

Court membership
- Chief Justice Warren E. Burger Associate Justices Hugo Black · William O. Douglas; John M. Harlan II · William J. Brennan Jr. Potter Stewart · Byron White; Thurgood Marshall · Harry Blackmun

Case opinion
- Majority: Burger, joined by unanimous

Davis v. Board of School Commissioners of Mobile County, 402 U.S. 33 (1971), was a United States Supreme Court case dealing with effective desegregation methods in public schools, specifically related to zoning. The Court held that the lower courts erred in not using all possible techniques to reach full desegregation. In a unanimous decision, the Court ordered the lower courts to make a more reasonable and effective plan; one "that promises realistically to work, and promises realistically to work now."

The Court reversed the lower court's decision that was intended to remedy segregation in Mobile, Alabama by decreasing the number of schools serving the over 90% Black population living on the east side of the Interstate 65 highway. In the plan accepted by the United States Court of Appeals for the Fifth Circuit for the 1970-71 school year, however, nearly all Black students were still going to all-Black or nearly all-Black schools by the end of the school year.

== Background ==
In metropolitan Mobile, Alabama, the Interstate 65 highway ran from north-south through the city. On the east side of the highway, about 94% of the metro population was Black, and schools were 65% Black and 35% white. Contrastly, on the west side of the highway, schools were 88% white and 12% Black.

Street map of Mobile, Alabama. Notice the I-65 running from the center-top to bottom.

After almost a decade since the ruling of Brown v. Board of Education, metropolitan Mobile was still heavily segregated. On March 27, 1963, a lawsuit was filed on behalf of 20 Black students in Mobile, including Birdie Mae Davis. The initial lawsuit stated the Mobile School Board had failed to comply with and enact the measures held in Brown. Under the initial lawsuit, several plans to desegregate Mobile's schools were considered and rejected by the United States District Court for the Southern District of Alabama. The United States Court of Appeals for the Fifth Circuit stepped in many times to consider the various plans. It rejected any plans with unified geographic zones, arguing unified geographic zones were unconstitutional and inadequate. Under another zoning plan by the District Court, around 60% of the city's metropolitan black students were still going to attend nearly all-Black or all-Black schools. The Court of Appeals reversed the plan, citing the ratio of faculty to students as inconsistent and unacceptable.

The Court of Appeals then called for a plan to eliminate the seven remaining all-Black elementary schools in the District Court's plan. Merely adjusting grade levels were used as the method, with bus transportation and split zoning not taken into consideration. Under further appeals and modifications by the United States Department of Justice, the final version of the plan reduced the amount of nearly all-Black or all-Black schools from twelve to six. Similarly to the District Court's plan, the western and eastern sides of the highway were treated distinctly from each other. The western side of the highway was easy to desegregate, however, after the 1970-1971 school year, nine elementary schools were over 90% Black. The Court of Appeals initially expected zero black junior and senior high schools students to be attending nearly all-black or all-black schools, but there were over 5,000 students still attending all-black or nearly all-black schools.

== Supreme Court ==
Davis was argued before the Supreme Court on October 13 and 14, 1970. NAACP Legal Defense Fund lawyer Jack Greenberg argued for the petitioners, Davis and the other students. Abram L. Phillips Jr. represented the respondents, the Board of School Commissioners of Mobile County. Erwin N. Griswold served as amicus curiae.

=== Decision ===
The Court ruled in a unanimous decision that the Court of Appeals and District Court erred in treating the western and eastern sides of the freeway separately and did not use all possible remedies to counteract segregation. The Court did affirm the Court of Appeals' ruling of the ratio of staff and faculty.

The Court reasoned the District Court and Court of Appeals' use of neighborhood zoning was not the only remedy possible and the District Court should have used any possible remedies, such as restructuring of attendance zones and busing once neighborhood zoning alone proved to be ineffective.

The Supreme Court remanded the case back to the lower courts and ordered them to make a zoning plan "that promises realistically to work, and promises realistically to work now."

== Subsequent proceedings ==
In the thirteenth appeal of the case, in 1975, the Court of Appeals reviewed a plan formulated by the counsel for plaintiffs, the Comprehensive Plan for a Unitary School System. It complied with a previous case, Singleton v. Jackson Municipal Separate School District, which ruled that school staff members must be hired, fired, promoted, paid, and demoted without any regard for race. Several further class action lawsuits were dismissed but two class actions filed on behalf of two black vice principals, Edwin Foster and James E. Buskey were appealed anyways on the grounds that they were denied promotion to principal based on race.

In 1976, another moment of contention was the arguing of improper attorney fees given to the persistent plaintiffs. The lengthy proceedings before and after the Supreme Court case caused many different lawyers to work on the case and the amount and type of work varied. The Court of Appeals affirmed some parts of the fees in a certain time period but reversed and remanded others.

In 1997, after many school district leaders called for the case to be dismissed, some of the original plaintiffs returned to oppose the closing of the case. The district had not been made fully unitary with some schools still being over 85% of a single race. Despite these efforts, federal judge William Brevard Hand ultimately dismissed the case on March 27.

== See also ==
- Brown v. Board of Education
- Green v. County School Board of New Kent County
- Swann v. Charlotte-Mecklenburg Board of Education
