= Henry R. Luscher =

American politician

Public Works Commissioner of Mobile
- In office 1953–1961
- Preceded by: unknown
- Succeeded by: George E. McNally

Personal details
- Born: Mobile, Alabama

Henry R. Luscher was a Mobile, Alabama-area community leader and politician who served two terms as the city's Public Safety Commissioner and several stints as the city's Mayor. All of his terms as Mayor of Mobile were when the title was co-extensive with the presidency of the City Commission. He was defeated for re-election in 1961 by challenger George E. McNally, the first open Republican elected to office in Mobile since Reconstruction. Luscher had also served as King of the Mobile Carnival Association during his youth.

Preceded by Charles F. Hackmeyer	Public Safety Commissioner of Mobile; 1953 — 1961	Succeeded by Lambert C. Mims
Preceded by Charles A. Baumhauer	79th Mayor of Mobile; 1953 — 1954	Succeeded by Charles F. Hackmeyer
Preceded by Joseph N. Langan	82nd Mayor of Mobile; 1956 — 1957	Succeeded by Joseph N. Langan
Preceded by Joseph N. Langan	84th Mayor of Mobile; 1958 — 1959	Succeeded by Joseph N. Langan
Preceded by Joseph N. Langan	86th Mayor of Mobile; 1960 — 1961	Succeeded by George E. McNally
