= List of mayors of Mobile, Alabama =

This is a list of mayors, or persons holding the equivalent office, of Mobile, Alabama, United States.

When Mobile came into the United States, it operated under a government system where the chief executive was called "President"

== Current Electoral Process ==
Under its current electoral process the mayor of Mobile Alabama is elected every 4 years under a two-round system where a second round featuring the top two vote earning candidates occurs if a candidate fails to receive a majority of votes (50%+1) in the first round. There are also no term limits for the position.

Under current city law to qualify for the position a person must be a registered voter in the city, be at least 25 years old, be a resident of the city 90 before the election date and pay a $500 qualifying fee.

== Presidents of Mobile ==
Nr.	Name	Term start	Term end
1	Destin Simison	1814	1816
2	James Innerarity	1816	1817
3	Daniel Duvol	1817	1818
4	Samuel H. Garrow	1818	1819

== Mayors of Mobile ==
Nr.	Name	Term start	Term end
1	Daniel Duvol	1819	1820
2	Addin Lewis	1820	1822
3	John Elliott	1822	1823
4	Addin Lewis	1823	1824
5	Samuel Garrow	1824	1827
6	John Fagan Everett	1827	1829
7	Samuel Garrow	1829	1831
8	John Stocking	1831	1835
9	John Everett	1835	1836
10	George Washington Owen	1836	1837
11	George Walton	1837	1839
12	Henry Chamberlain	1839	1840
13	Edward Hall	1840	1842
14	Charles Hoppin	1842	1845
15	Blanton McAlpine	1845	1847
16	J. W. Childers	1847	1848
17	Charles Langdon	1848	1851
18	Joseph Seawell (c. 1809–1883)	1851	1852
19	Charles Langdon	1852	1855
20	Mitchell Withers	1855	1860
21	John Forsyth	1860	1861
22	R. H. Slough	1861	1865
23	Mitchell Withers	1866	1867
24	Gustavus Horton	1867	1868
25	Caleb Price	1868	1870
26	George Harrington	1870	1871
27	Martin Horst	1871	1872
28	Gideon Parker	1872	1873
29	Cleveland F. Moulton	1873	1874
30	John Reid	1874	1875
31	Alphonse Hurtel	1875	1878
32	George Duffee	1878	1879
33	Richard Owen	1879	1888
34	Joe Rich	1888	1894
35	Constantine Lawrence Lavretta	1894	1897
36	John Bush	1897	1900
37	Tom Fry	1900	1902
38	Walter Walsh	1902	1903
39	Charles McClean	1903	1904
40	Pat Lyons	1904	1911

=== Mayors of Mobile between 1911 and 1985 (President of the City Commission) ===
From 1911 to 1985, Mobile was governed by a three-member city commission. The office of Mayor of Mobile rotated between the members of the commission and was the title given to the President of the Commission. The last directly elected mayor before the institution of the commission was Patrick J. Lyons. He was the 40th mayor of Mobile. Lyons would go on to be elected to the City Commission where he would serve as mayor several more times. The numbers listed correspond to their order within the overall list of the mayors of Mobile, not their order in presiding over the commission.

Nr.	Image	Name	Term start	Term end
41		Lazarus Schwarz	1911	1913
42		Patrick J. Lyons	1913	1914
43		Harry Pillans	1914	1915
44	"	Patrick J. Lyons	1915	1916
45		Harry Pillans	1916	1917
46	"	Patrick J. Lyons	1917	1918
47		George E. Crawford	1918	1919
48		Harry Pillans	1919	1921
49		George E. Crawford	1921	1922
50		Richard V. Taylor	1922	1924
51		Harry T. Hartwell	1924	1925
52		George E. Crawford	1925	1926
53		Harry T. Hartwell	1926	1927
54		Leon Schwarz	1927	1928
55		Cecil F. Bates	1928	1929
56		Harry T. Hartwell	1929	1930
57		Leon Schwarz	1930	1931
58		Cecil F. Bates	1931	1932
59		Harry T. Hartwell	1932	1933
60		Richard V. Taylor	1933	1934
61		Cecil F. Bates	1934	1935
62		Charles A. Baumhauer	1935	1936
63		Richard V. Taylor	1936	1937
64		Cecil F. Bates	1937	1938
65		Charles A. Baumhauer	1938	1939
66		Cecil F. Bates	1939	1941
67		Charles A. Baumhauer	1941	1942
68		Ernest M. Megginson	1942	1943
69		Robin C. Herndon	1943	1944
70		Charles A. Baumhauer	1944	1945
71		Ernest M. Megginson	1945	1946
72		Robin C. Herndon	1946	1947
73		Charles A. Baumhauer	1947	1948
74		Ernest M Megginson	1948	1949
75		Charles A. Baumhauer	1949	1950
76		Ernest M. Megginson	1950	1951
77		Joseph R. Mitternight	1951	1952
78		Charles A. Baumhauer	1952	1953
79		Henry R. Luscher	1953	1954
80		Charles F. Hackmeyer	1954	1955
81		Joseph N. Langan	1955	1956
82		Henry R. Luscher	1956	1957
83		Joseph N. Langan	1957	1958
84		Henry R. Luscher	1958	1959
85		Joseph N. Langan	1959	1960
86		Henry R. Luscher	1960	1961
87		George E. McNally	1961	1962
88		Charles S. Trimmier	1962	1963
89		Joseph N. Langan	1963	1964
90		Charles S. Trimmier	1964	1965
91		Joseph N. Langan	1965	1967
92		Arthur R. Outlaw	1967	1968
93		Lambert C. Mims	1968	1969
94		Joseph A. Bailey	1969	1971
95		Robert B. Doyle	1971	1972
96		Lambert C. Mims	1972	1973
97		Gary A. Greenough	1973	1975
98		Robert B. Doyle	1975	1976
99		Lambert C. Mims	1976	1979
100		Gary A. Greenough	1979	1980
101		Robert B. Doyle	1980	1981
102		Gary A. Greenough	1981	1983
103		Robert B. Doyle	1983	1984
104		Lambert C. Mims	1984	1985

=== Mayors of Mobile since 1985 ===
After several commissioners had faced corruption indictments and popular support grew for discarding the old commission system, Mobile restored direct elections in 1985, electing Arthur Outlaw as their first directly elected mayor since 1911.

Nr.	Image	Name	Term start	Term end
105		Arthur Outlaw	1985	October 1989
106		Mike Dow	October 1989	October 3, 2005
107		Sam Jones	October 3, 2005	November 4, 2013
108		Sandy Stimpson	November 4, 2013	November 3, 2025
109		Spiro Cheriogotis	November 3, 2025	Present

== Chiefs of Staff to the Mayor ==
Name	Term start	Term end
Robert O. Bostwick Jr.	1989	1994
Alfred Stokes	1994	2013
Colby J. Cooper	2013	2016
Paul Wesch	2016	2020
James Barber	2021	Current

== See also ==
- Timeline of Mobile, Alabama
- 2025 Mobile mayoral election
