= Charles F. Hackmeyer =

American politician and community leader

Public Works Commissioner of Mobile
- In office 1953–1961
- Preceded by: unknown
- Succeeded by: Charles S. Trimmier

Personal details
- Born: August 15, 1903
- Died: March 4, 1989 (aged 85)

Charles F. Hackmeyer (1903-1989) was a Mobile, Alabama-area community leader and politician who served two terms on the Mobile City Commission. He was also the city's 80th Mayor. His terms as Mayor of Mobile was when the title was co-extensive with the presidency of the City Commission. He was defeated for re-election in 1961 by challenger Charles S. Trimmier who would go would only serve one term, losing four years later to Lambert C. Mims.

Preceded by unknown	Public Works Commissioner of Mobile; 1953 — 1961	Succeeded by Charles S. Trimmier
Preceded by Henry R. Luscher	80th Mayor of Mobile; 1954 — 1955	Succeeded by Joseph N. Langan
