= 2021 Mobile mayoral election =

- August 24, 2021
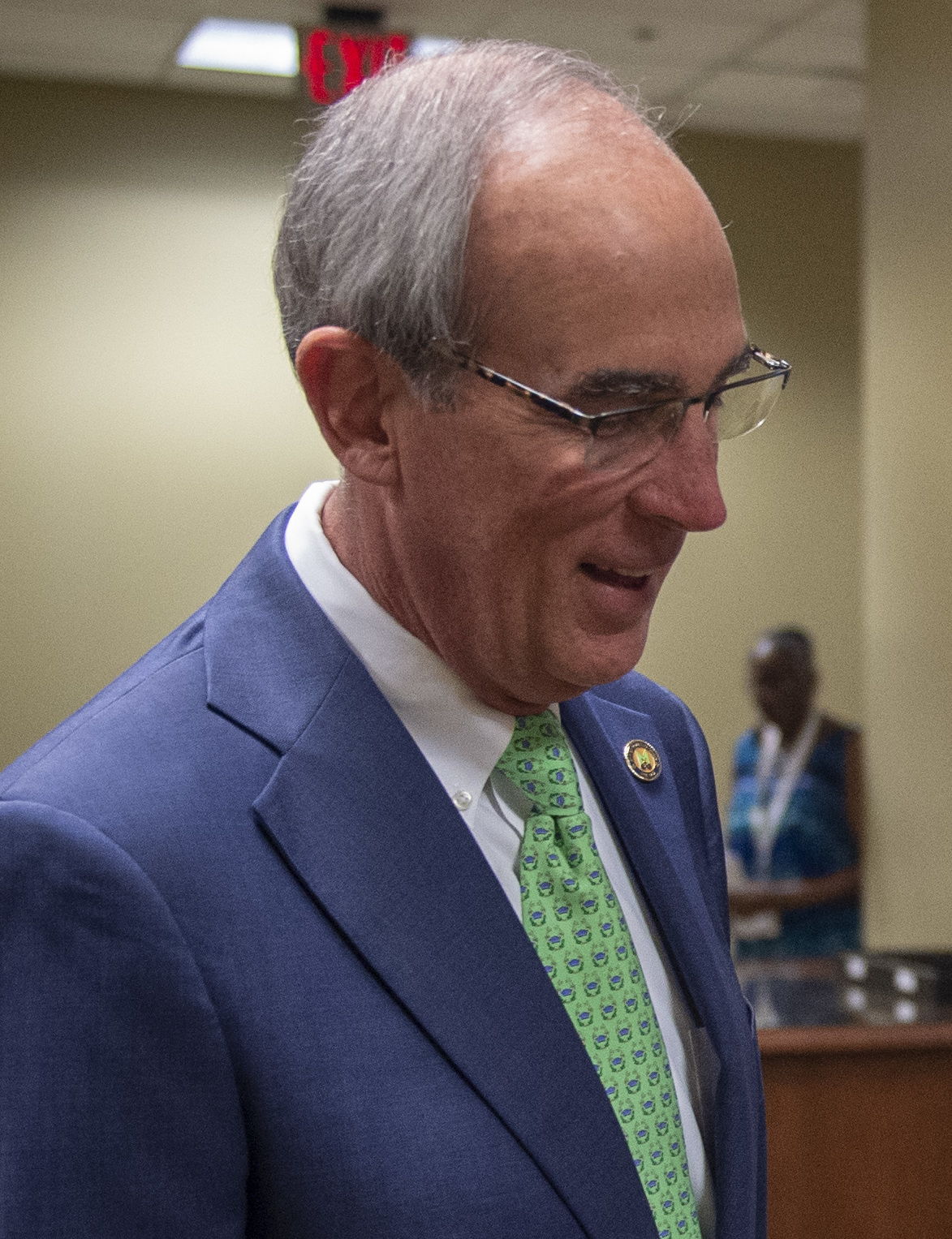

Candidate	Sandy Stimpson	Fred Richardson	Karlos Finley
Party	Nonpartisan	Nonpartisan	Nonpartisan
Alliance	Republican	Democratic	Democratic
Popular vote	21,269	7,538	4,849
Percentage	62.5%	22.1%	14.2%
Mayor before election
Sandy Stimpson
Republican
Elected Mayor
Sandy Stimpson
Republican

The 2021 Mobile mayoral election was held on August 24, 2021, to elect the mayor of Mobile, Alabama. Incumbent Republican mayor Sandy Stimpson was re-elected to a third term.

== Candidates ==
=== Declared ===
- Donavette Ely, candidate for mayor in 2017
- Karlos Finley, municipal judge (party affiliation: Democratic)
- Fred Richardson, city councillor (party affiliation: Democratic)
- Sandy Stimpson, incumbent mayor (party affiliation: Republican)
- Michael Young, co-founder of the Gulf Coast Mental Health Coalition

== Results ==
Mobile mayoral election results
Party	Candidate	Votes	%
Nonpartisan	Sandy Stimpson (incumbent)	21,269	62.5
Nonpartisan	Fred Richardson	7,538	22.1
Nonpartisan	Karlos Finley	4,849	14.2
Nonpartisan	Donavette Ely	239	0.7
Nonpartisan	Michael Young	142	0.4
Total votes		34,397	100.00
