= Baumhauer =

Baumhauer is a German surname meaning "lumberjack". Notable people with the surname include:

- Charles A. Baumhauer (1889–1982), American community leader and politician
- Joseph Baumhauer (died 1772), prominent German ébéniste that worked in France
- Heinrich Adolph Baumhauer (1848–1926), German chemist and mineralogist

== See also ==
- 9699 Baumhauer, main-belt asteroid
- Bob Baumhower (born 1955), American football player
