= Spiro Cheriogotis =

American politician

109th Mayor of Mobile
- Incumbent
- Assumed office November 3, 2025
- Preceded by: Sandy Stimpson

Personal details
- Born: January 28, 1982 (age 44) Dothan, Alabama, U.S.
- Party: Republican
- Spouse: Lucy Greer Cheriogotis
- Education: University of Alabama (BS); University of Alabama (JD)

Spiro Nicholas Cheriogotis (born January 28, 1982 or 1983) is an American politician who is the 109th and current mayor of Mobile, Alabama, serving since November 2025. In the 2025 Mobile Mayoral Election, he won against state representative Barbara Drummond with 51.4% of the votes in the runoff election. He was previously a Mobile County district judge from 2019 to 2025.

== Biography ==
=== Early life and education ===
Raised in Dothan, Alabama, Cheriogotis graduated with a Juris Doctor from the University of Alabama School of Law. His father was convicted of manslaughter and was sentenced to 15 years in prison in 1988.

=== Career ===
Upon graduating, he went to work as a prosecutor for the Mobile County District Attorney’s office. In 2018, he was elected a District Court Judge for Mobile County, a position he held until elected mayor in 2025. In 2022, he became Presiding District Judge. After becoming a judge, Cheriogotis said the experience of having an incarcerated father helped him in the legal profession.

==== 2025 Mobile mayoral election ====
In the general election, state representative Barbara Drummond received 13,897 votes or 33.7%. Cheriogotis received 11,389 votes or 27.7%.

Cheriogotis hosted events such as a pickleball event at Pickle Rage indoor pickleball court in Mobile, grills, and a victory party during his campaign.

Because no candidate received a majority (50% or higher) of the votes, a runoff election was held on September 13. In the end, Cheriogotis won with 24,714 votes or 51.4% to Drummond’s 23,370 votes or 48.6%.

On November 3, 2025, Cheriogotis was sworn in as the 109th mayor of Mobile.

== Personal life ==
In 2012, Cheriogotis married Lucy Greer Cheriogotis. They have four children. Lucy is Vice President of Deli, Bakery, and Catering for her family's grocery chain, Greer's Markets.
