= Joseph C. Mitchell =

American politician (born 1948)

Member of Alabama House of Representatives for District 103
- In office 1994–2014
- Succeeded by: Barbara Drummond

Personal details
- Born: May 28, 1948 (age 78)
- Party: Democratic
- Education: Morehouse College; University of South Alabama; Texas A&M University; University of Alabama at Birmingham

Joseph C. Mitchell (born May 28, 1948) is an American politician. He was a member of the Alabama House of Representatives and represented District 103.

Mitchell is African American.
