= William Brevard Hand =

American judge (1924–2008)

W. Brevard Hand

Senior Judge of the United States District Court for the Southern District of Alabama
- In office January 19, 1989 – September 6, 2008

Chief Judge of the United States District Court for the Southern District of Alabama
- In office 1981–1989
- Preceded by: Thomas Virgil Pittman
- Succeeded by: Alex T. Howard Jr.

Judge of the United States District Court for the Southern District of Alabama
- In office September 22, 1971 – January 19, 1989
- Appointed by: Richard Nixon
- Preceded by: Daniel Holcombe Thomas
- Succeeded by: Richard W. Vollmer Jr.

Personal details
- Born: William Brevard Hand; January 18, 1924 Mobile, Alabama, US
- Died: September 6, 2008 (aged 84) Mobile, Alabama, US
- Party: Republican
- Education: University of Alabama (B.S.); University of Alabama School of Law (LL.B.)

William Brevard Hand (January 18, 1924 – September 6, 2008) was a United States district judge of the United States District Court for the Southern District of Alabama.

== Early life and education ==
Hand was born in Mobile, Alabama, where his father, Charles C. Hand, served as president of the local bar association and founded the law firm of Hand, Arendell. His father had moved from Shubuta, Mississippi (on the Chickasawhay River in Clarke County near the Alabama border) circa 1920, where his father (Hand's grandfather) was a physician. Hand graduated from Murphy High School, then served from 1943 to 1946 in the United States Army as a combat infantry rifleman during World War II. He then used the G.I. Bill to attend college at the University of Alabama at Tuscaloosa and received a Bachelor of Science degree in 1947. In 1949, Hand received his Bachelor of Laws from the University of Alabama School of Law.

== Legal career ==
After admission to the Alabama bar in 1949, Hand joined his father's law firm, practicing until his appointment as a federal judge in 1971. Hand supported the Republican Party by 1962, in particular James D. Martin of Gadsden for the United States Senate against the veteran Democrat J. Lister Hill of Montgomery.

== Federal judicial service ==
On July 26, 1971, President Richard Nixon nominated Hand to a seat on the United States District Court for the Southern District of Alabama since Judge Daniel Holcombe Thomas had taken senior status. The United States Senate confirmed Hand on September 21, 1971, and he received his commission the next day. Hand would serve as the district's Chief Judge from 1981 to 1989. He assumed senior status on January 19, 1989, and continued to handle that reduced caseload until his death on September 6, 2008, in Mobile.

Hand roused controversy soon after his confirmation by hanging a large Confederate flag on his office wall. Illinois State University history professor considers Judge Hand an important figure in America's culture wars because of his longstanding disagreement with incorporation of the Bill of Rights at the state level, which he argues influenced Edwin Meese and Justice Antonin Scalia. Judge Hand's most public cases were of two types: involving desegregation and his concept of secular humanism.

=== Desegregation cases ===
Desegregation of schools in Alabama, including Mobile, had been the subject of controversy since the United States Supreme Court's decisions in Brown v. Board of Education in 1955, but the legal case was first filed in 1963 by the NAACP Legal Defense fund on behalf of Birdie Mae Davis, and other parents organized by John LeFlore, the head of the local NAACP and who died shortly after being elected to the Alabama House of Representatives in 1971. That case was initially assigned to then Chief Judge Daniel Holcombe Thomas and appeals reached the Fifth Circuit Court of Appeals several times before the United States Supreme Court decided it as a companion case to Swann v. Charlotte-Mecklenburg Board of Education in 1971, After issuing several orders in conformity with that decision, Judge Thomas assumed senior status and the case was reassigned to Judge Hand. By the time it reached Judge Hand, it had become primarily subject to negotiations, and consent orders. Judge Hand appointed a large advisory committee and two supervisory scholars, who assisted in guiding the process. Ultimately, Judge Hand dismissed the case in 1997.

Meanwhile, in 1975, Wiley Bolden and other prominent black Mobilians filed a lawsuit challenging Mobile's at-large system of selecting commissioners, that diluted the black vote, and Lila Brown initiated a similar lawsuit with respect to the Mobile County Board of Education. Because the city hired Hand's former law firm (by then Hand, Arendall, Bedsole, Greaves and Johnston) to handle its defense, Hand recused himself and judge Virgil Pittman (who succeeded Thomas as Chief Judge) was assigned the case, which the U.S. Supreme Court ultimately decided as City of Mobile v. Bolden.

=== Secular humanism cases ===
Beginning in 1987 Hand again received considerable attention for his views concerning secular humanism. In a prayer breakfast speech commemorating Law Day in Anniston, Alabama in 1986, Hand condemned spreading immorality in society, which he blamed on a human-centered worldview. He presided over two cases involving religious issues, and the trial of Smith v. Board of Commissioners of Mobile County was about to start. The sister case brought by parent Ishmael Jafree against compulsory school had begun in 1981, and Judge Hand allowed a group of local evangelical Christians to intervene, who alleged that they were the victims of the school board's policy of secular humanism.

Judge Hand ruled for the plaintiffs in a case against the Alabama Association of School Boards claiming that textbooks used in Alabama promoted secular humanism, and as such were in violation of the Establishment clause. In his 172-page ruling, later republished as a book with a foreword by Richard John Neuhaus Judge Hand ordered the removal of forty-four texts across the state in subjects such as history and social studies.

The case was brought in Hand's district after his opinions regarding a 1982 school prayer ruling in Alabama. The United States Court of Appeals for the Eleventh Circuit unanimously reversed him, with Judge Frank stating that Hand held a "misconception of the relationship between church and state mandated by the establishment clause," commenting also that the textbooks did not show "an attitude antagonistic to theistic belief. The message conveyed by these textbooks is one of neutrality: the textbooks neither endorse theistic religion as a system of belief, nor discredit it." Ultimately, the United States Supreme Court disagreed with Hand's assessment, finding Alabama's silent school prayer law unconstitutional in Wallace v. Jaffree (1985).

== Death ==
Judge Hand died in Mobile in 2008.

== Sources ==
Legal offices
Preceded by Daniel Holcombe Thomas	Judge of the United States District Court for the Southern District of Alabama; 1971–1989	Succeeded by Richard W. Vollmer Jr.
Preceded by Thomas Virgil Pittman	Chief Judge of the United States District Court for the Southern District of Alabama; 1981–1989	Succeeded by Alex T. Howard Jr.
