= Charles S. Trimmier =

American politician

Public Works Commissioner of Mobile
- In office 1961–1965
- Preceded by: Charles F. Hackmeyer
- Succeeded by: Lambert C. Mims

Personal details
- Born: October 25, 1918 Philadelphia, Pennsylvania, U.S.
- Died: January 23, 1967 (aged 48) Baldwin County, Alabama, U.S.
- Spouse: Lucille Anderson Trimmier
- Children: Charles Stephen Trimmier Jr.

Charles Stephen Trimmier (October 25, 1918 – January 23, 1967) was a Mobile, Alabama-area community leader and politician who served one term as the city's Public Works Commissioner (1961-1965), during which he also served two one-year terms as the city's Mayor. Both of his terms as Mayor of Mobile were when the title was co-extensive with the presidency of the City Commission.

== Early and family life ==
Charles Trimmier was born in Philadelphia, Pennsylvania to the former Elma Bross, and her steamfitter husband Buford Trimmier, who had been born in North Carolina. His eldest of three brothers, John Alden Trimmier, had been born 11 years earlier in Ohio, and his eldest of several sisters had been born in West Virginia, as had their mother. By 1930, his mother had moved with four daughters and two sons to Chicago, Illinois, where his 20-year-old daughter Helen supported them by working as a clerk at Bell Telephone company.

He married Lucille Elizabeth Anderson, who was active in several clubs in Mobile and survived him by four decades (d. 2007). They had a son, Charles S. Trimmier Jr., who survived them.

== Career ==
In 1937, Trimmier enlisted in the Marines, but was discharged 2 years later. In 1940, Trimmier lived in Springfield, Illinois with his wife and worked for Continental National Bank. Trimmier enlisted in the Alabama Army National Guard on January 1, 1951, but was released on August 1, 1951, as the Korean War continued.

== Political career ==
Trimmier defeated Mobile's incumbent public works commissioner Charlie Hackmeyer, and began his four-year term in 1961. He had criticized the incumbent administration, and Hackmeyer in particular for his support in Mobile's African-American community, such that in the general election the only incumbent commissioner re-elected was veteran Joseph N. Langan. Although facing a tax indictment, Trimmier formed a biracial Mobile Economic Commission to help secure federal funds for welfare programs in his city. Nonetheless, Lambert C. Mims, who had considerable support from his Baptist congregation, defeated Trimmier's re-election bid in 1965, and would win re-election numerous times, serving 20 years.

Meanwhile, 1964, Trimmier ran to represent Alabama's 1st congressional district, since the Mobile area effectively had no congressman after redistricting cost veteran Frank Boykin his seat. Trimmier survived the first May primary (in which Clara Stone Fields Collins was eliminated, but lost the runoff to John M. Tyson Sr., who then lost to Republican Jack Edwards in the general election.

Trimmier was an opponent of racial integration. In response to a petition to consider the topic, he claimed that the petitioner was "fomenting insurrection and threatening to upend the harmony of race relations in Mobile."

== Death and legacy ==
Trimmer died in a car crash near Spanish Fort, Baldwin County, Alabama on January 23, 1967.

Trimmier Park at 3600 Alba Club Rd in Mobile was named after him.

Preceded by Charles F. Hackmeyer	Public Works Commissioner of Mobile; 1961 — 1965	Succeeded by Lambert C. Mims
Preceded by George E. McNally	88th Mayor of Mobile; 1962 — 1963	Succeeded by Joseph N. Langan
Preceded by Joseph N. Langan	90th Mayor of Mobile; 1964 — 1965	Succeeded by Joseph N. Langan
