= Mike Dow =

American politician

106th Mayor of Mobile
- In office 1989–2005
- Preceded by: Arthur R. Outlaw
- Succeeded by: Sam Jones

Personal details
- Born: Michael Craig Dow; 1947 (age 78–79) South Carolina
- Party: Independent
- Spouse: Patsy Busby Dow
- Children: Michael Shawn Dow; Christopher Steele Dow; Anna Lynn Dow
- Education: University of South Alabama

Michael Craig Dow (born 1947) is an American politician who served as the 106th mayor of Mobile, Alabama from 1989 to 2005. He is widely credited with leading the redevelopment of downtown Mobile. He was mentioned as a potential gubernatorial candidate in 2010, but declined to run.

== Early life and education ==
Dow was born in South Carolina and was raised as a foster child. He had a troubled childhood. His father left his family when he was ten and his mother suffered from mental illness. As a consequence, Mike became a ward of the state. Later, at about the age of 14, he was taken in by his maternal grandfather, Henry Gainous.

Dow joined the U.S. Army, serving as a paratrooper in his first tour of duty and as a door gunner for subsequent tours in Vietnam. He survived several helicopter crashes but, in his fourth flight, his pilot and best friend, Johnny Legg, was killed. Dow was following his friend in another helicopter at the time of the incident. After Legg's death, Dow decided to leave the military. He still keeps a rubbing of Mr. Legg's name from the Vietnam memorial in his office.

After leaving Vietnam and the military, Dow returned to college, earning a master's degree in accounting from the University of South Alabama.

== Business ==
In 1979, Dow co-founded QMS (Quality Micro Systems) with his brother-in-law, Jim Busby. Dow took on a variety of roles, serving as Vice President of Sales, Marketing, and Accounting for the company. Quality Micro Systems, a printer manufacturing company, at one time competed with giants like Hewlett Packard, Canon, Xerox, and Tektronix and was listed in the Fortune 500. Dow is credited with creating the company's European distribution network. After Black Monday, the company was forced to downsize and was eventually purchased by Minolta to become Minolta-QMS in 2000.

Prior to this, Dow left QMS and entered electoral politics, joining the Democratic Party. He ran as a candidate in 1989 for city council from District 6.

== Election of 1989 ==
From 1911 to the 1980s, the city had a city commission government, with commissioners elected at-large. It returned to a mayor-council government to provide more representation by a breadth of city voters. Arthur Outlaw was elected as mayor in 1985, for the first time since 1911 as a direct candidate, by a comfortable margin. He ran as a 'statesman' candidate, based on his having served terms on the city commission in the 1960s, 70s and 80s.

During his term, he worked with the city's first directly elected council in 1987 to pass an historic 15-year master plan. It proposed construction of a convention center on the Mobile River to stimulate downtown development. Gradually opposition to the convention center mounted. Outlaw was affiliated with Spring Hill College and active in the Mobile Carnival Association (he was a member of the 1948 MCA court); he was considered to be part of the traditional Mobile establishment. During this period, he also served as Chairman of the Alabama Republican Party. (Municipal elections in Alabama are non-partisan.)

Dow intended to run for City Council from District 6 in the southwestern portion of the city. Joe Bullard, who owned an auto dealership, was pondering his own run for the mayoralty. Early in the season, former mayor Lambert C. Mims was indicted for ethics violations while in office. He was considered the primary competitor to Outlaw. Mims suggested that Dow run for mayor, and said he would give him strong support from his base.

At the urging of Bullard and Mims, businessman Dow decided to run for Mayor. He promoted himself as a new style candidate, reaching out to both black and white voters. Dow's campaign included a coalition of African-American ministers and he frequently attended mass at African-American churches throughout the city. He campaigned against the convention center. He won the election by a very convincing margin and his election suggested a shift in leadership in Mobile. Dow's victory was based on his support among middle-class white voters and African Americans. Outlaw carried the upper-class white vote.

== Mayoralty ==
During his early months in office, Dow demonstrated his interest in downtown redevelopment. Despite campaigning against the convention center, he began to support the project. Dow proposed what he called "The String of Pearls", a series of projects meant to help spur the redevelopment of downtown. He moved forward with both the strategies outlined in the 15-year plan of Outlaw, and the convention center. Dow dramatically increased capital spending, as well as the city's sales tax, raising it to 4%, giving Mobile an overall sales tax rate of 9%.

During his first term, Dow worked with county leaders to secure the construction of Mobile Government Plaza, the first governmental structure in the United States to house both city and county governments.

In 1993, Bess Rich was elected to the city council in District 6; Dow won re-election that year with more than 65% of the vote. Rich frequently questioned Dow's agenda of capital spending without a sustainable revenue source. Most of the city council supported him. When the Mobile BayBears team approached the city, Rich opposed the borrowing for construction of the stadium because she believed in allowing the public to vote on non-basic service capital projects. She also opposed the attention Dow gave to capital projects downtown, because of the increased debt load from borrowing it placed on the community with no thought to paying back the debt or obtaining funds to support maintenance of the projects. As a result of Dow's aggressive capital building program, the city was left with little money in its future budgets for basic capital needs. In 2001, Bess Rich gave him the strongest challenge for his office since his initial election in 1989.

Another key feature of the Dow administration were attempts at annexation. The Mobile city limits, with the exception of a few areas, had largely been set with the mass annexation of 1956. At various times, Dow put forth proposals to annex parts of West Mobile and Tillman's Corner, but these failed. Dow was highly popular in the city, but not so in the suburbs. His support for expanded gambling in the state (and city) was opposed by many evangelical Protestants. belief that legalized gambling would be a boon for Mobile, and the fact that the casinos in Biloxi were drawing a large clientele from Mobile. Another concern of this area was their concern that Dow would increase their taxes as he did in the city. His terms as Mayor saw a general erosion of white support over time (though over time he picked up most of Outlaw's voters from 1989) while he steadily increased his support among black Mobilians. Dow cruised to re-election in 1997, and began to be mentioned as a gubernatorial candidate.

During Dow's third term, downtown redevelopment continued. In 2001 Dow signed a deal with the Retirement Systems of Alabama to construct a skyscraper in downtown Mobile. The RSA Tower now towers over the city at 745 feet In 2001, Bess Rich, who had limited herself to two terms on the city council, decided to run for mayor. Rich challenged the mayor on the borrowing which the city had done. Dow won the election 61-39%, winning every district except Rich's own District 6, where he lost 55-45%. (By comparison, Rich had won that district with 70% of the vote in her re-election bid in 1997). In 2001 Charlie Waller and Mabin Hicks, Dow allies on the council, were replaced by Steve Nodine and Ben Brooks. Connie Hudson won in District 6 and the three formed an anti-Dow bloc on the city council.

The main issues of his fourth term were an annexation of West Mobile which failed, a vote in West Mobile to incorporate it, which also failed, and the construction of the Alabama Cruise Ship Terminal on the waterfront, which added its second ship in August 2008. Dow also began actively courting Thyssen-Krupp, which was surveying sites for a steel mill, and Boeing, which was investigation sites for manufacturing their Dreamliner plane.

During the course of Dow's fourth term, crime in Mobile continued to drop. His popularity began to rise as people saw the results of investment in downtown Mobile.

It was also during his fourth term that the proposed "Mardi Gras Park" was approved, in a deal with the Mobile County Commission.

=== Controversies ===
==== Vietnam Flag ====
Mobile Government Plaza contains displays in the atrium in which there are displays of flags. One contains a rostrum of American state flags, one a rostrum of international flags. During Dow's third term, it was found that the flag representing the nation of Vietnam was the flag that had been used by the Saigon government of South Vietnam. Because Dow is a veteran of the Vietnam War, a minor controversy arose concerning whether or not he had made the decision to supplant the flag of united Vietnam with the flag of South Vietnam. The flag was changed to the correct one and it has become a largely forgotten part of his administration.

==== Changing of the Mobile City Seal ====
The Mobile City Seal, which had been in use for decades, contained the six national flags (excluding the Republic of West Florida) that have flown over the city during its history. One of those governments was the Confederate States of America, and the city honored this by placing the Confederate Naval Jack on the seal. This seal was on police cars, marked city vehicles, historical markers, and a battle flag was flown at Government Plaza along with the other national flags. The city's African-American councilmen began pushing for a change in the seal to the First National Flag, which garnered outrage from Confederate heritage groups. The first vote before the council reached no conclusion, with black members voting for the first national, Bess Rich voting for the second national, another councilman voting for the third national and Reggie Copeland and Mabin Hicks voting to keep the seal as it was. After a considerable amount of controversy, a compromise was made, wherein the city dropped the battle flag from the seal, replacing it with the Third National Flag.

==== Cuba ====
It was during the Dow administration that Mobile established formal sister city relations with Havana, Cuba. Delegations from the Mobile-La Habana society took part in these trips and the Mayor went on several of them. This brought criticism from those who thought that Mobile shouldn't have been sending delegations to Cuba in light of the embargoes against the communist nation. However, the trips did establish links between officials in Mobile and officials in Havana that could be useful when trade is restored between the United States and Cuba.

=== Election of 2005 ===
In early 2005, Dow called a morning news conference in which he announced that he was not going to run for a fifth term. He stayed out of the campaign during the non-partisan first round primary. Three of the candidates ran as Dow supporters and people who would continue the Dow legacy: County Commissioner Samuel L. Jones, City Councilman John Peavy (a Catholic), Bess Rich, the former city council member and community activist, and Republican former State Senator Ann Bedsole, whose bid to become governor of Alabama had ended in the 1994 Republican runoff election against former Governor Fob James because of opposition from anti-abortion groups who disapproved of her support for reproductive freedom. Bedsole had also sponsored a symbolic measure in the legislature calling for the secession of Mobile from Alabama. She also refused to endorse James in the 1994 general election, but he narrowly prevailed. The frontrunners were Jones, vying to become the city's first black mayor while keep issues of race off the table (at this date, the city's website doesn't even mention that he is the first black mayor), and Bedsole, one of the city's leading socialites, who boasted the largest campaign warchest in the race.

In the first election, held on August 17, 2005, Jones nearly won it outright with 46% and Peavy placed second with approximately 37%. Both Ann Bedsole and Bess Rich received roughly 14% of the vote, however, given that three candidates were running on continuing the work of Dow, pro-Dow candidates combined polled 86% of the citywide vote, and the runoff was set between two Dow allies.

In a surprise move, a few days before the election, Dow formally endorsed Sam Jones, and Jones went on to win the election with a 57-43% margin. Jones did not win over as many black voters as Dow had won, but he traded it off with gains in white voters from Dow's endorsement. Dow formally left office the first week of October 2005.

=== Hurricane Katrina ===
Hurricane Katrina struck the Gulf Coast two weeks after the non-partisan primary election and two weeks before the non-partisan runoff. Katrina actually determined the course of a city council race as an African-American incumbent used pictures from New Orleans tying the scenes of black victims of the storm to supporters of his opponents. It caused a backlash amongst white voters in the district and led to his defeat. The councilman, Thomas Sullivan, had been an ally of Dow while on the council, he was replaced with William Carroll, a black Catholic contractor who had played football for McGill-Toolen and had served as a staffer for Senator Howell Heflin.

During Katrina, Mobile received hurricane-force winds and the worst surge it had seen since the Hurricane of 1916, with areas that hadn't flooded since being built upon flooding. Damage was heavy in the Dog River area, and among the numerous creeks and culverts that cross through the city. It was also responsible for heavy flooding downtown. Dow was at the press conference that Bush held at Mobile Regional Airport in which the lines "heck of a job, Brownie" were uttered. Dow can be recognized in the footage through his short stature, gray hair and mustache. Because it hit at the end of his term, Hurricane Katrina did not have much of an impact on the overall legacy of Dow, as this work went to his successor in the mayor's office, Samuel L. Jones.

== Post-mayoral career ==
After stepping down from office, Dow went to work for his brother-in-law, this time for the CentraLite venture. He also became involved with the effort to create the Alabama Motorsports Park on a site located north of Mobile. Dow helped gain a site in Mobile County over a possible site in Baldwin County. Dow serves as a member of the board of the track venture.

=== Political affiliation and future ===
Dow worked to keep party politics out of city government. By the end of his term, he was supported by a coalition on the city council of white Republicans, representing middle and upper-class voters, and black Democrats. His opposition consisted of white Republicans who appeared to rely on working-class whites for support. The cross-party coalitions developed in the non-partisan elections.

Preceded by Arthur R. Outlaw	106th Mayor of Mobile; 1989 – 2005	Succeeded by Samuel L. Jones
