= Langan Park =

Public park in Mobile, Alabama, US

Coordinates: 30.70795°N 88.15806°W

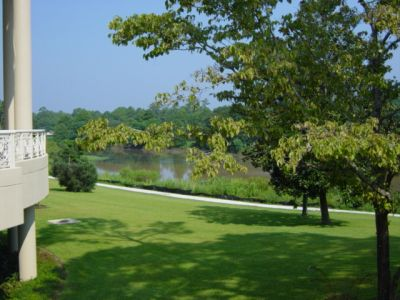
- Langan Park near the Mobile Museum of Art.
- Interactive map of Langan Park
- Type: Public park
- Location: Mobile, Alabama, US
- Area: 720 acres (291 ha)
- Created: 1957
- Operator: The City of Mobile
- Status: Open all year

Langan Park, also known as Municipal Park, is a 720-acre (291 ha) municipal park in the Spring Hill neighborhood of Mobile, Alabama, US. The park opened in 1957 and was named for Joseph N. Langan, a former Mobile mayor, state senator and city commissioner. It has lakes, natural spaces, tennis courts, children’s playgrounds and picnic areas. It is also the site of the Azalea City Golf Course, the Mobile Botanical Gardens, the Mobile Museum of Art and Playhouse in the Park.

== Activities ==
The Azalea City Golf Course is an 18-hole public golf course owned and operated by the city. It opened in 1957 and has hosted Professional Golfers Association events. In 1998, all eighteen greens were redesigned and updated to an average of 5,500 sq ft (511 m^{2}) per green and were planted in Champion Bermuda grass. The Mobile Tennis Center is a public tennis facility with 50 tennis courts, all lighted and hard-court, with a professional shop and professional instruction on site.

The Mobile Botanical Gardens have a variety of flora spread over 100 acres (40 ha). The gardens contain a rhododendron garden with 1,000 evergreen and native azaleas and the 30-acre (12 ha) Longleaf Pine Habitat. The Mobile Museum of Art has European, non-Western, American and decorative arts collections.

Playhouse in the Park began in 1961 and concentrates on training young people in theatre arts. The program includes four large productions a year and consists of a training program for drama, dance, vocal, piano and scenic art classes. It also includes a traveling professional drama troupe and a full-scale puppet theatre.

== Invasive species ==
The main lake in the park has become home to several invasive species, including the channeled applesnail and tilapia. Both are known to be very destructive to the native aquatic vegetation. Biologists speculate that the snails were most probably dumped into the lake from home aquaria. In 2009, applesnails were found downstream from the lake in Three Mile Creek, posing an immediate threat to the entire Mobile-Tensaw River Delta.
