= Barbara Drummond =

American politician (born 1956)

Member of the Alabama House of Representatives from the 103rd district
- Incumbent
- Assumed office November 5, 2014
- Preceded by: Joseph C. Mitchell

Personal details
- Born: August 5, 1956 (age 69) Mobile, Alabama, U.S.
- Party: Democratic
- Education: University of South Alabama (BA)

Barbara Jarrett Drummond (born August 5, 1956) is an American politician who has served in the Alabama House of Representatives from the 103rd district since 2014. She is a member of the Democratic Party.

In February 2025, Drummond announced her candidacy for mayor of Mobile, Alabama, and she advanced to the runoff election placing first with 33.7% of the vote. She lost the runoff to Republican Spiro Cheriogotis.

== Early life and career ==
Drummond graduated from the University of South Alabama with a Bachelor's degree in communications. She worked as a reporter for the Mobile Press-Register. In the early 2000s, she moved to work in county administration, working as the director of the Public Affairs and Community Services Department for Mobile County.

== Alabama House of Representatives ==
In February 2014, Drummond announced her candidacy for the Democratic nomination in Alabama's 103rd House of Representatives district. The district was an open seat after incumbent Joseph C. Mitchell announced his retirement. She defeated Charlie Staten in the Democratic primary on June 3. She then defeated Republican nominee Ralph Carmichael in the general election, receiving over 70% of the vote. She was re-elected unopposed in 2018 and 2022.

== 2025 Mobile mayoral election ==
Drummond announced her candidacy in the 2025 Mobile mayoral election on February 23, 2025. She advanced to the runoff after receiving the most votes in the first round, 33% of the vote. The Democratic National Committee launched an organizational effort to support her candidacy for the runoff.
