= Daniel Holcombe Thomas =

American judge

Senior Judge of the United States District Court for the Southern District of Alabama
- In office August 25, 1971 – April 13, 2000

Chief Judge of the United States District Court for the Southern District of Alabama
- In office 1966–1971
- Preceded by: Office established
- Succeeded by: Thomas Virgil Pittman

Judge of the United States District Court for the Southern District of Alabama
- In office March 9, 1951 – August 25, 1971
- Appointed by: Harry S. Truman
- Preceded by: John McDuffie
- Succeeded by: William Brevard Hand

Personal details
- Born: Daniel Holcombe Thomas; August 25, 1906 Prattville, Alabama, U.S.
- Died: April 13, 2000 (aged 93) Mobile, Alabama, U.S.
- Education: University of Alabama School of Law (LL.B.)

Daniel Holcombe Thomas (August 25, 1906 – April 13, 2000) was a United States district judge who served nearly five decades on the United States District Court for the Southern District of Alabama.

== Early life and education ==
Born in Prattville, Alabama, Thomas came from a family of lawyers and judges. His father was a local probate judge for Autauga County, Alabama. His uncle William Holcombe Thomas had served on the Alabama Supreme Court and another uncle, J. Render Thomas was that court's clerk; his paternal grandfather W.C. Thomas had served in the state legislature. Daniel H. Thomas received a Bachelor of Laws from the University of Alabama School of Law in 1928.

== Legal and military careers ==
Thomas was in private practice in Mobile, Alabama from 1929 to 1943. He also became an assistant solicitor for Mobile County, Alabama during the Great Depression (1932 to 1939). He became Mobile County's acting solicitor in 1943. Called into military service during World War II, Thomas served in the United States Navy as a Lieutenant (from 1943 to 1946). He then returned to private practice in Mobile from 1946 to 1951 with Joseph Lyons and Sam Pipes as the firm of Lyons, Thomas and Pipes.

== Federal judicial service ==
President Harry S. Truman on January 29, 1951, nominated Thomas to a seat on the United States District Court for the Southern District of Alabama vacated by Judge John McDuffie. The United States Senate confirmed Thomas's nomination on March 6, 1951, and he received his commission on March 9, 1951. For several years Judge Thomas was the only federal judge in his district, until Judge Virgil Pittman (initially confirmed as judge for both the Middle and Southern Districts of Alabama) was reassigned solely to the Southern District. Judge Thomas served as Chief Judge from 1966 to 1971 (succeeded by Judge Pittman), and assumed senior status on August 25, 1971. He became known for his personal integrity.

=== Selma voter registration ===
In April 1961 he was assigned a case brought by the U.S. Department of Justice under the Civil Rights Act of 1957 against the state of Alabama and the Dallas County voter registration office (then one man, but later led by Victor Atkins) which failed to register most black persons who wanted to vote in Selma while registering unqualified whites. The U.S. Court of Appeals for the Fifth Circuit found he should have issued the injunction, although not overturning most of Thomas' factual findings about the intolerable slowdown against the Alabama officials.

=== Mobile school desegregation ===
One of Judge Thomas' most famous (and probably frustrating) cases involved the desegregation of Mobile's schools. Mobile had more than tripled its size since World War I, and by 1962 the segregated school system was Alabama's largest, and 27,965 of the 72,696 students (over 40%) were black, although only 10% of administrators were black (though 37% of teachers and principals were black and unusual for the South, black and white teachers had the same pay scale). Shortly after the school board rejected the request of John LeFlore on behalf of African American parents and the NAACP for integration of Mobile County's schools, the U.S. Department of Justice filed suit in the U.S. District Court, contending that such racial segregation of children of service members and federal workers violated the 14th Amendment (Brookley Air Force Base on Mobile's southern border was one of the largest federal installations in the country). Soon, LeFlore accompanied four black students who attempted transfer to Baker High School in Mobile County west of the city, and were denied, so the NAACP lawyers filed Birdie Mae Davis et al v. Board of School Commissioners of Mobile County on March 27, 1963. The local NAACP lawyers were Vernon Z. Crawford and Clarence E. Moses, assisted by Derrick Bell and Constance Baker Motley of the NAACP Legal Defense Fund in New York City.

The lawsuits were initially upstaged by nonviolent demonstrators led by Rev. Martin Luther King Jr., but Judge Thomas held a hearing on April 24, 1963, and required the school board to submit a desegregation plan. School officials argued that they could not prepare a desegregation plan by that fall, because the schools were massively overcrowded and 14 new schools with more than 300 classrooms were under construction. Judge Thomas thus denied the parents' request for immediate relief, but after another hearing on November 14 again ordered a desegregation plan, but for the 1964-1965 school year. The parents appealed and weeks after Governor George Wallace tried to defy a desegregation order for the University of Alabama at Birmingham, a divided 5th Circuit panel in July ordered Mobile's school board to start desegregation that fall. Justice Hugo Black refused the school board's request for a stay.

Mobile's School Board then proposed that only the 12th grade in Mobile City be desegregated that year, with additional grades in later years. Judge Thomas approved the plan, but after the white Mobile Citizens Council held a rally at which former Birmingham mayor Arthur Hanes and Montgomery's Leonard Wilson preached resistance, only two black students were scheduled to attend formerly all-white Murphy High School. However, when they appeared, they and their lawyers were greeted by the Highway Patrol's Chief, who read Governor Wallace's Executive Order No. 12 forbidding desegregation in Birmingham, Mobile and Tuskegee.

Judge Thomas and four other federal district judges from Alabama soon ordered Wallace to stop interfering, but Wallace instead tried to replace the state troopers at the schools with national guardsman. However, President John F. Kennedy nationalized the troops and they withdrew, allowing Henry Hobdy and Dorothy Davis to attend classes at Murphy High School on September 10, 1963, unlike the protests at one Birmingham school. However, the following day some students chanted protests at Murphy High and the White Citizens Council promised to pay protesters' court costs. Moreover, after about 40 white Citizens Council members protested at the school board meeting, and the board voted to bar news media from the campus, the following day's larger protests led to arrests. City commissioners Joseph N. Langan (a Democrat) and George E. McNally (a Republican) lectured 54 detained students about breaking the law. The desegregation case in Judge Thomas' courtroom continued (trial began November 14, 1963, a week before President Kennedy's assassination), but incidents at Murphy High continued through the school year, and more conservatives won in the local November 1963 elections.

On June 18, 1964, the Fifth Circuit ordered the Mobile school board to proceed more swiftly, citing Armstrong v. Birmingham, so on July 31, Judge Thomas accepted the school board's new "freedom of choice" plan, which would continue until 1968, despite several appeals by the parent plaintiffs, as well as modifications by Judge Thomas. That fall 32 African American pupils (out of approximately 31,000 black students in the school system) attended nine formerly all-white schools. In May 1966, the U.S. Department of Education threatened to withdraw federal school aid because of the slow pace of desegregation, but Governor Wallace asked the state legislature to allocate funds to any school district facing such federal cutbacks. On August 16, 1966, the Fifth Circuit again reversed Judge Thomas, ruling against what it saw as the board's racially segregated feeder pattern.

By June 1967, the U.S. Department of Justice intervened in the Birdie Mae Davis case, so Judge Thomas held further hearings and in August modified the freedom of choice plan. Thus as the 1967 school year began in September, 692 black students in Mobile attended 28 formerly white schools. On March 13, 1968, the Fifth Circuit again reversed Judge Thomas, Judge Homer Thornberry noted that two-thirds of the county's schools remained totally segregated. However, less than a month later, Dr. Martin Luther King was assassinated, and riots ensued in Mobile (as in other cities). Moreover, May 26, 1968, the U.S. Supreme Court issued Green v. County School Board of New Kent County, which found against Virginia's "freedom of choice" plan.

Judge Thomas held further hearings in July, but his opinion and decree of July 29, 1968, allowed the freedom of choice plan to continue in rural parts of Mobile County. Both the plaintiffs and U.S. Justice Department appealed. In its April 1968 order, the Fifth Circuit had required the district court to oversee school construction, but on March 14, 1969, allowed expansion to the all-black Toulminville High School. In 1968 3,484 black students attended formerly white schools and 253 white students were assigned to formerly black schools, so in April 1969 Judge Thomas ordered the desegregation plan continued for another year, including the freedom of choice in the rural areas.

However, on June 3, 1969, the Fifth Circuit again reversed Judge Thomas and directed him to consult with the U.S. Department of Education, as well as continued an injunction against renovating Howard Elementary and Toulminville High schools. When the HEW plan called for busing between the inner city and suburbs, the Mobile Register, long aligned against desegregation, covered many objectors, including U.S. Representative Jack Edwards and Sen. James Allen. Judge Thomas rejected forced busing for schools west of I-65, and ordered the school board to prepare a new plan. The NAACP and Justice Department appealed, and many dissenters attended the school board meetings. Protests accompanied the start of the next school year, and some called for boycotts. Nonetheless, the Fifth Circuit affirmed Judge Thomas's August 1 order on December 1, 1969, only to be reversed by the U.S. Supreme Court on January 14, 1970. Judge Thomas issued an order on January 31, 1970, which he acknowledged would please no one. On March 4, 1971, the Alabama legislature defied the federal courts by passing a Freedom of Choice act, and soon the Mobile School Board announced it would not follow Judge Thomas' order.

On June 8, 1970, the Fifth Circuit again reversed Judge Thomas' order, having consolidated 13 desegregation cases in Singleton v. Jackson. It noted that the traditionally black schools east of I-65 were still not desegregated, and also required judges to oversee all school construction, consolidation and site selection to prevent recurrence of the dual school structure. Thus Judge Thomas issued several orders on June 12 to comply with the appellate court's direction. The School Board appealed to the U.S. Supreme Court and Gov. Wallace spoke defiantly at Mobile's Labor Day celebration. The new school year began with low attendance, and several brawls and arrests. The U.S. Supreme Court accepted the school board's appeal as a companion to Swann v. Charlotte Mecklenburg, and Chief Justice Burger issued its decision on April 20, 1971, allowing courts to order busing. Schools opened in September 1971 with busing, but no significant disruption.

Upon assuming senior status on August 25, 1971, Judge Thomas transferred the Mobile desegregation case to Judge William Brevard Hand. However, he continued to receive and hear other cases for nearly three decades on his decreased workload.

== Death and legacy ==
Thomas died on April 13, 2000, in Mobile. He is buried in historic Spring Hill Cemetery, which had been annexed to Mobile city in the 1960s.

== See also ==
- List of United States federal judges by longevity of service

== Sources ==
Legal offices
Preceded by John McDuffie	Judge of the United States District Court for the Southern District of Alabama; 1951–1971	Succeeded by William Brevard Hand
Preceded by Office established	Chief Judge of the United States District Court for the Southern District of Alabama; 1966–1971	Succeeded by Thomas Virgil Pittman
