= George E. McNally =

American politician

Public Safety Commissioner of Mobile
- In office 1961–1965
- Preceded by: Henry R. Luscher
- Succeeded by: Arthur R. Outlaw

Personal details
- Born: December 24, 1923 Chicago, Illinois, US
- Died: December 16, 1988 (aged 64) Atlanta, Georgia, US
- Party: Republican
- Spouse: Emily Bell McNally
- Children: George Edward McNally, Jr. and Jerome Bell McNally
- Education: Northwestern University Law School

George Edward McNally (December 24, 1923 — December 16, 1987) was an American lawyer, soldier, politician and bureaucrat. Born and educated in Illinois, he became a community leader in Mobile, Alabama and its first Republican mayor elected since Reconstruction, after winning election as the city's Public Safety Commissioner in the 1960s. McNally later became a federal bureaucrat and ran the south eastern regional office of the (newly established) Urban Mass Transit Administration in Atlanta, Georgia in the 1970s.

== Early life and education ==
George E. McNally was born on Christmas Eve, 1923 in Chicago, Illinois to Michigan-born Dr. William D. McNally and his Illinois-born wife Helen. Like his elder brother Jerome, he attended Chicago Public Schools, graduating from Schurz High School in 1941. During World War II, McNally was activated from the Army reserves in 1943, assigned to the Office of Strategic Services and worked behind enemy lines in the China/Burma/India Himalayan corridor. Using the GI bill, he graduated from Northwestern University School of Law and by 1955 moved to Mobile, Alabama, where he became a community leader during desegregation controversies following the Supreme Court's decisions in Brown v. Board of Education. McNally was a Methodist and active in the American Legion and Veterans of Foreign Wars based on his military service, as well as the Georgia chapter of the Sons of the American Revolution (becoming the chapter president) and the Mayflower Society, both based on his family background.

In October 1956, he married Mobile native and southern belle, Emily Bell (1924-2017), a doctor's daughter and Wesleyan College graduate who had been a member of the Queen's Court of the Mobile Mardi Gras in 1947, and who taught drama at the Julius T. Wright School for Girls in Mobile and later at the Callanwolde Fine Arts Center of Atlanta, Georgia. They had two sons.

== Politics ==
George E. McNally entered the Republican Party, and won election to the governing City Commission in 1961 by defeating incumbent Public Safety commissioner Henry R. Luscher, as racial tensions escalated in the area due to the city's huge growth during and after World War II, as well as Massive Resistance to the U.S. Supreme Court decisions in Brown v. Board of Education. McNally became the first Republican elected to office in Mobile since Reconstruction.

McNally pushed to create an Industrial Development Board with the power to issue bonds, as well as attract new business to the area, greatly dependent upon Brookley Air Force Base. However, the local Chamber of Commerce considered such its job, and the IDB board would be disbanded.

His term as Mayor of Mobile was when the title was co-extensive with the presidency of the City Commission. During protests following integration of Murphy High School in September 1963, commissioner McNally worked with fellow commissioner (and Democrat) Joseph N. Langan to de-escalate. However, Alabama's new governor George Wallace vehemently opposed desegregation in the state, and while Mobile did not experience the violence of Birmingham and Selma, cross-burnings and fire-bombings did occur. The Birdie Mae Davis school desegregation case would drag on until 1997, even after a decision unfavorable to the Mobile County School Board in 1971. Meanwhile, following Alabama's vote for Republican Presidential candidate Barry Goldwater in the 1964 elections, President Lyndon B. Johnson declared Brookley Air Force base faced closure, and challenger Arthur R. Outlaw defeated McNally's re-election bid in 1965. Outlaw had campaigned some with Wallace, although nearly two decades later he would also join the Republican party.

McNally became an administrator of the Urban Mass Transit Administration, which required him to move to Atlanta.

== Death ==
McNally died of cancer in Atlanta, Georgia in 1988.

Preceded by Henry R. Luscher	Public Safety Commissioner of Mobile; 1961 — 1965	Succeeded by Arthur R. Outlaw
Preceded by Henry R. Luscher	87th Mayor of Mobile; 1961 — 1962	Succeeded by Charles S. Trimmier
