= Mobile Museum of Art =

Museum in Alabama

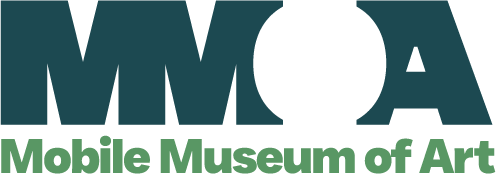

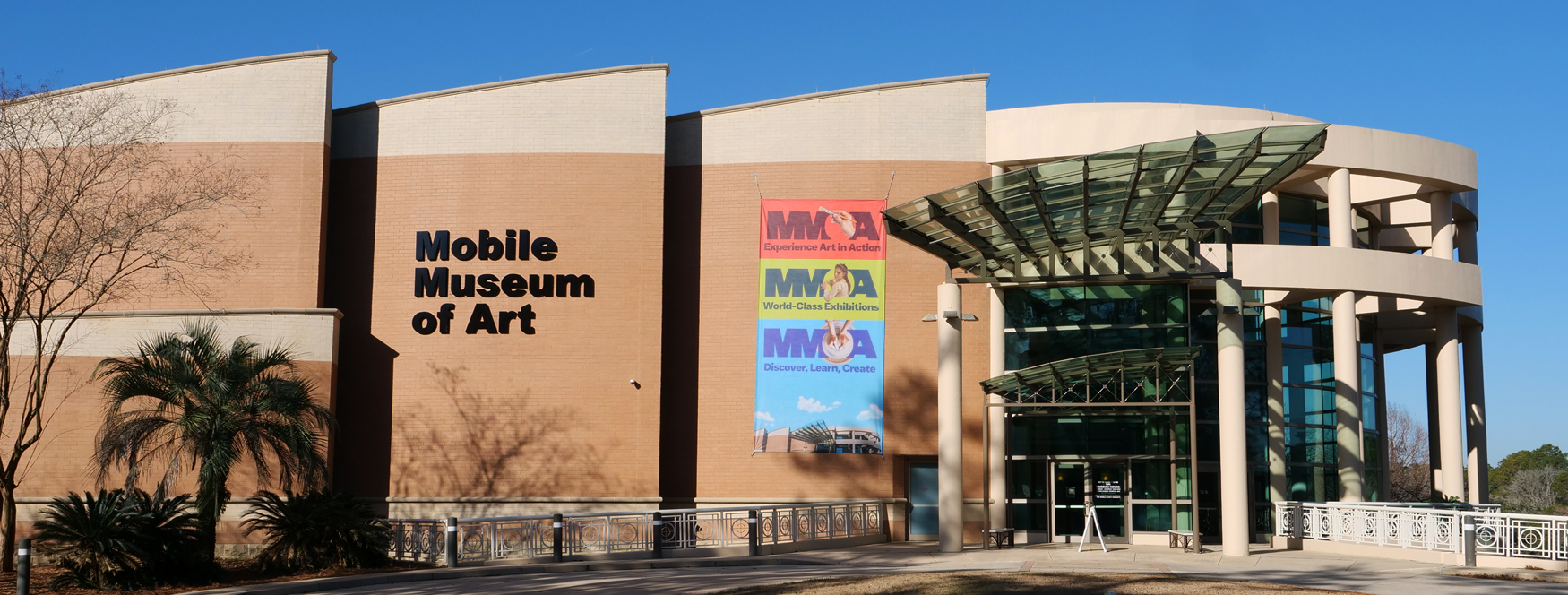

- Location within Mobile, Alabama
- Established: 1963
- Location: 4850 Museum Drive; Mobile, Alabama, USA
- Coordinates: 30°42′13″N 088°09′19″W
- Type: Art
- Director: Jon Carfagno
- Curator: Stan Hackney
- Website: www.mobilemuseumofart.com

Mobile Museum of Art (MMoA) is an art museum located in Mobile, Alabama. It features extensive art collections from the United States, Europe, and non-western art. The museum hosts exhibitions, multi-disciplinary programs (including film, poetry, and dance), and studio art classes for all ages.

== Facilities ==
The museum was founded in 1963 as a public-private entity. The art museum has evolved into the only accredited art museum in south Alabama, with a collection of more than 6,400 artworks, being paintings, sculptures, decorative arts, works on paper, and crafts. The museum is located in the city-owned Langan Park, and in 2002, underwent a $15 million expansion, designed by The Architects Group of Mobile, to triple its size to 86,444 square feet (8,030.91 m^{2}) on 9.3 acres. The museum is a member of the North American Reciprocal Museums program as well as the Southeastern Reciprocal Membership program.

== Collections ==
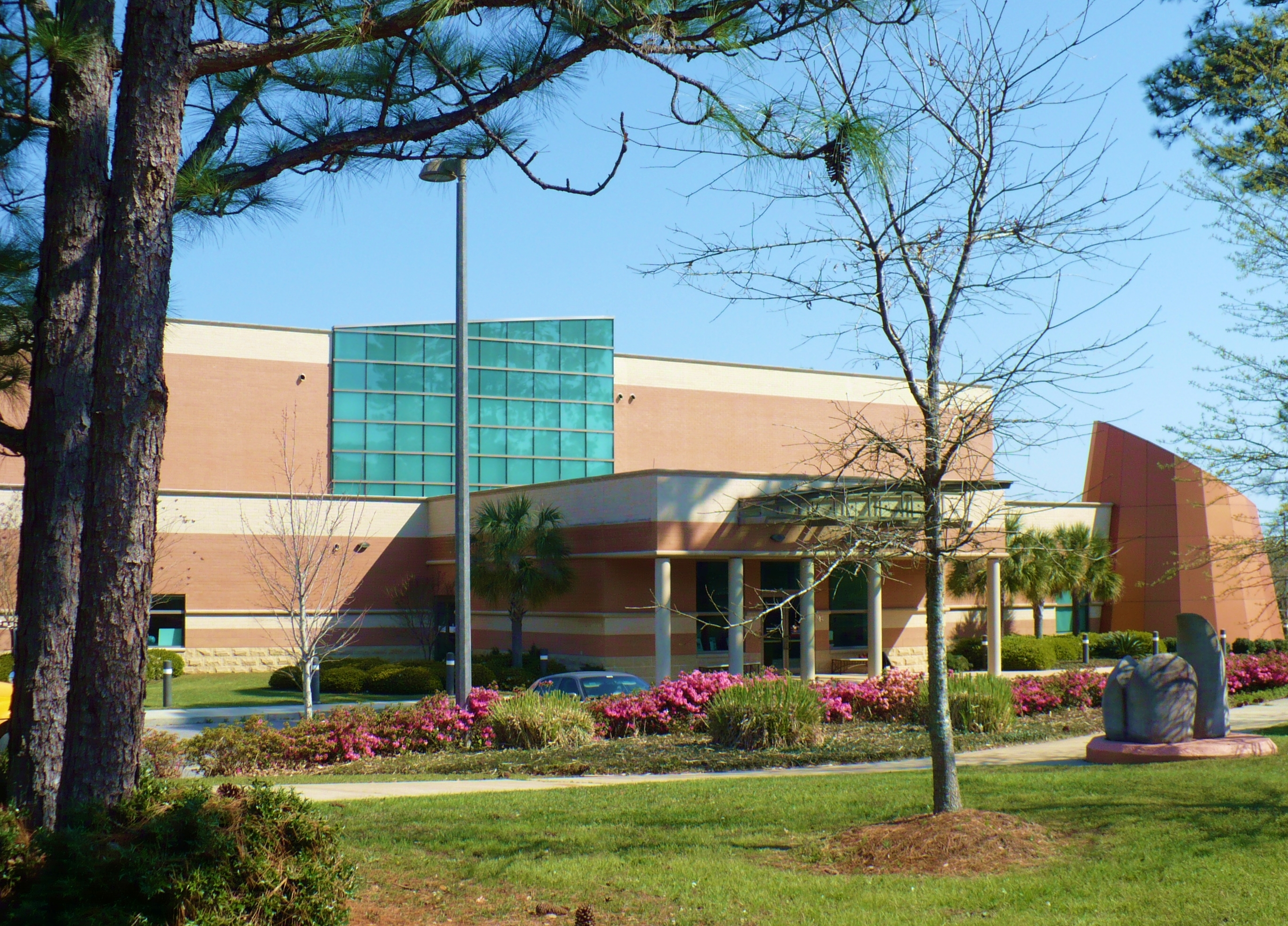
View from Museum Drive in Langan Park

The museum hosts collection and loan exhibitions. The collection consists of the Mary and Charles Rodning Gallery of Asian Art, the Katharine C. Cochrane Gallery of American Art Collection, and the Maisel Gallery of European Art. The Asian Collection contains selections of works ranging from ancient Chinese bronzes and ceramics to early 20th century works. The American Gallery features furniture, sculpture and paintings dating primarily from 1770 onwards. The European Gallery contains a broad overview of European paintings, prints, sculpture, and decorative arts. The museum also regularly features the collection in new or re-imagined exhibitions such as Alabama Print Portfolio, Native American Art from the Collection, Passion for Collecting, and more.

The art museum also maintains a schedule of rotating, special exhibitions that includes work by regional artists as well as exhibitions featuring work by nationally and internationally recognized artists.

From the beginning, Mobile Museum of Art and the Art Patrons League jointly sponsored the Annual Outdoor Arts and Crafts Fair, which raised money for many of the museum's most significant acquisitions. In 2001 while the new facility was under construction, Elise Haverty and Dr. J. Rhodes Haverty of Atlanta made their first gift of contemporary glass. International in its scope, their gift now consists of more than 183 pieces.
