= John L. LeFlore =

American civil rights leader and politician

John L. LeFlore (1903–1976) was an American civil rights leader and politician in Mobile, Alabama. While working for the United States Post Office, LeFlore worked for integration. He founded the local chapter of the National Association for the Advancement of Colored People in 1925 and led it for decades. During the massive resistance controversy over school desegregation, Alabama expelled the NAACP in 1956, so LeFlore helped found the Non-Partisan Voting League. He served as its director of casework from 1959 until his death, including organizing two lawsuits which reached the United States Supreme Court, one concerning Mobile's at-large method of selecting the commissioners who ran the city (Mobile v. Bolden), and one which led to desegregation of Mobile County's schools (Birdie Mae Davis v. Board of Commissioners of Mobile County, which was a companion case to Swann v. Charlotte-Mecklenburg Board of Education and adjudicated by Chief U.S. District Judge Daniel Holcombe Thomas during LeFlore's lifetime). In 1974 LeFlore won election to Alabama's House of Representatives, but died during his term.

== Background ==
John L. LeFlore was born and raised in 1903 in Mobile, attending local Black segregated schools. As an adult he started working for the United States Post Office, which was considered a good career path. In 1925, he founded the local chapter of the National Association for the Advancement of Colored People, leading it for decades and working to improve civil rights for the Black community.

In 1956, the state attorney general and state courts forced the NAACP to stop operating in the state. LeFlore and others founded the Non-Partisan Voting League (NPVL) that year in Mobile to carry on the civil rights struggle. Among its activities was to promote the election of better candidates in elections.

In 1957, LeFlore introduced what were known as "pink sheets", which gave information and endorsement of candidates in city elections. The NPVL recommended the election of Joseph N. Langan as a commissioner, who had already formed an alliance with LeFlore to promote civil rights in the city. He served four terms as city commissioner, continuing to work with LeFlore on voting rights, hiring Black people as municipal employees, and integrating public facilities.

From 1959 until his death, LeFlore was the director of casework for the NPVL. He conducted investigations of social issues, initiated court proceedings, and acted as spokesman of the organization. During this period, the NPVL worked to increase hiring of Black employees in city government, sued for desegregation of the Mobile public school system after the US Supreme Court ruling in Brown v. Board of Education (1954), "filed complaints with the U.S. Department of Justice to open public accommodations to all, [and] launched massive voter registration drive campaigns to bring large numbers of African Americans into the political process".

In 1974, nearly a decade after passage of the Voting Rights Act of 1965 expanded participation by African Americans in politics in the South, LeFlore was elected to the Alabama House of Representatives as a Democrat. He served in that position until his death in 1976.

In 1975, the NPVL initiated a legal challenge to Mobile's city commission form of government, saying that the at-large voting for three commissioners prevented the African-American minority from electing representatives of their choice. In 1985, after a long court battle, voters approved a mayor-city council form of government in a referendum. That year, elections were held for seven city council seats from single-member districts, and three African Americans were elected to office for the first time in the city government. The position of mayor was elected at-large, also for a four-year term.

== Legacy and honors ==
- LeFlore's papers are held by the University of South Alabama, which also has the papers of the NPVL.
- A statue of him and Joseph N. Langan was dedicated in August 2009 by city officials at Unity Point Park in Mobile to commemorate their work together to advance civil rights in the city.
- LeFlore Magnet High School, located in the Toulminville neighborhood of Mobile was named in his honor.
- Rue de Le Flore, a street located off of Stanton Road in the Toulminville neighborhood, was also named in his honor.
