= Charles A. Baumhauer =

American politician

Finance Commissioner of Mobile
- In office 1933–1953
- Preceded by: Harry T. Hartwell
- Succeeded by: Joseph N. Langan

Personal details
- Born: August 16, 1889 Mobile, Alabama, U.S.
- Died: June 22, 1982 (aged 92) Mobile, Alabama, U.S.

Charles A. Baumhauer (August 16, 1889 – June 22, 1982) was a Mobile, Alabama-area community leader and politician who served several terms on the Mobile City Commission as well as several terms as mayor of Mobile. All of his terms as mayor were when the title was co-extensive with the presidency of the City Commission. He was defeated for re-election in 1953 by Joseph N. Langan.

Preceded by Harry T. Hartwell	Finance Commissioner of Mobile; 1933 — 1953	Succeeded by Joseph N. Langan
Preceded by Cecil F. Bates	62nd Mayor of Mobile; 1935 — 1936	Succeeded by Richard V. Taylor
Preceded by Cecil F. Bates	65th Mayor of Mobile; 1938 — 1939	Succeeded by Cecil F. Bates
Preceded by Cecil F. Bates	67th Mayor of Mobile; 1941 — 1942	Succeeded by Ernest M. Megginson
Preceded by Robin C. Herndon	70th Mayor of Mobile; 1944 — 1945	Succeeded by Ernest M. Megginson
Preceded by Robin C. Herndon	73rd Mayor of Mobile; 1947 — 1948	Succeeded by Ernest M. Megginson
Preceded by Ernest M. Megginson	75th Mayor of Mobile; 1949 — 1950	Succeeded by Ernest M. Megginson
Preceded by Joseph R. Mitternight	78th Mayor of Mobile; 1952 — 1953	Succeeded by Henry R. Luscher
