= Lambert C. Mims =

American politician

Public Works Commissioner of Mobile
- In office 1965–1985
- Preceded by: Charles S. Trimmier
- Succeeded by: office abolished

Personal details
- Born: April 20, 1930 Uriah, Alabama
- Died: November 25, 2008 (aged 78) Mobile, Alabama
- Spouse: Reecie Mims

Lambert C. Mims (April 20, 1930 – November 25, 2008) was an American politician and author who for two decades was a member of the City Commission of Mobile, Alabama (1965-1985). During this period, he also served co-terminously in several one-year terms as the commission's president and city's mayor. He considered himself deeply religious, he saw morality as a cornerstone of Mobile's community. His two decades in public service were overshadowed by a controversial corruption conviction in 1990.

== Early life and education ==
Born on a farm in Uriah, Monroe County, Alabama, in 1930. His ancestors moved from South Carolina in the early 1800s, founding what was known as Fort Mims in what became Baldwin County, Alabama.

== Career ==
Too young to serve in World War II, Mims moved to growing Mobile, Alabama when he was 19. After working as a salesman, Mims co-founded the Phillips-Mims Feed and Flour Company. In 1965, he started his own wholesale feed and flour business, Mims Brokerage.

That same year, amid racial tensions in Mobile at the start of the Civil Rights era, Mims successfully ran for public works commissioner, one of three members of the city commission. The commissioners rotated one-year terms as Mobile’s mayor. Mims was re-elected four times, serving a total of 20 years on the commission and several terms as mayor.

Mims was a member of Riverside Baptist Church on Dauphin Island Parkway (AL 163) and was known for promoting public morality. In 1969, he published For Christ and Country, which in part criticized what he called “moral pollution” as a greater threat to the community than environmental pollution. Thus he passed a local anti-pornography resolution and also shut down a play he considered too racy but being performed at the University of South Alabama, which had been created during his lengthy tenure. With federal and state assistance Mobile also completed the George Wallace Tunnels and the Interstate 10 Bayway, rebuilt Fort Conde, and the Tennessee-Tombigbee Waterway linked Mobile to the Tennessee River system including north Alabama.Mims also helped Mobile recover following the devastation of Hurricane Frederic in 1979.

=== At-large voting controversy ===
Even before the riots which followed the assassination of Dr. Martin Luther King Jr. in 1968, Mims became known for clashing with the Neighborhood Organized Workers, a group of young African Americans including future city councilor Fred Richardson who opposed the gradualist policies of fellow-commissioner-until-1969 Joseph N. Langan and John LeFlore, a postal worker who had organized the local NAACP branch decades earlier.

Ultimately African Americans filed several lawsuits against to city in the 1970s, of which Wiley Bolton v. City of Mobile (concerning at-large voting's effect diluting African American voting rights) went to trial twice, as well as reached the U.S. Supreme Court in Mobile v. Bolden. After the first trial and decision by U.S. District Judge Virgil Pittman favored the black plaintiffs, the "Constitutional Crisis Committee" asked for the judge's impeachment, and Mims offered to sign the impeachment petition, but the city attorney advised against it. Although the Fifth Circuit upheld Judge Pittman, the United States Supreme Court reversed the judgment in Mobile v. Bolden, prompting a second hearing before Judge Pittman. Judge Pittman had postponed the 1977 city election, allowing the Mims and his two fellow committeemen elected in 1973 to remain in office.

Ultimately, a "smoking gun" letter was discovered and admitted into evidence—written by Mobile lawyer and Congressman Frederick G. Bromberg to the Alabama legislature in 1909 it indicated the purpose of the at-large system was to prevent blacks from holding office. Both Commissioners Mims and Greenough promised not to appeal the second Bolden decision if the city lost, although Commissioner Robert Doyle avoided the issue. Ultimately, Doyle won re-election outright in 1981, while both Mims and Greenough won their races in runoffs.

The second Bolden decision, issued on April 15, 1982, also favored the plaintiffs. On January 31, 1983, rather than appeal, all parties agreed to a settlement whereby the next election for city office would be based on districts rather than at-large. The Alabama legislature passed appropriate legislation and 72% of state voters on May 15, 1985 approved switching to a Mayor-council government. Three African Americans were elected among the 7 new districts, the first blacks to serve in Mobile's government since Reconstruction.

Thus, Mims became the last mayor of Mobile to govern through the non-partisan city commission system which dated from 1911. In 1985 Mims chose against running for mayor or a seat representing one of the new districts.

== Indictment and conviction ==
In 1989, Mims, a Democrat, entered the race for mayor, still considered a non-partisan position, against his former fellow-commissioner and, by then Republican incumbent mayor Arthur R. Outlaw. Shortly afterward, he was charged on three counts in a 35-count racketeering indictment by Jeff Sessions, then U.S. attorney for the United States District Court for the Southern District of Alabama (from 1981 to 1994). The charges concerned negotiations that had taken place four years earlier, while Mims was still in office, for the construction of a trash-to-steam energy plant that was never built. Mims claimed that Republicans had timed the charges to halt his political campaign and called them "a satanic attack." After a trial with four co-defendants in April 1990, a jury convicted Mins on two counts of extortion in violation of the Hobbs Act. He served 46 months of a 10-year prison sentence and was paroled in 1997. That same year, he filed a civil suit to have his sentence vacated, but was unsuccessful.

== Later life ==
In his final years, Mims ran a real estate business in Mobile and continued civic participation through the Waterfront Rescue Mission, as well as assisting at local nursing homes and other charitable institutions. In 2005, Mims self-published his autobiography, Mayor on a Mission: From the Cotton Patch to City Hall.

== Death and legacy ==
Mims died of natural causes on November 25, 2008. He donated his papers to the University of South Alabama.

== Bibliography ==
- For Christ and Country, Old Tappan, N.J., 1969)
- Mayor on Mission: From the Cotton Patch to City Hall, Coral Springs, Fla., 2005 (ISBN 1595264922, ISBN 978-0544103344)

Preceded by Charles S. Trimmier	Public Works Commissioner of Mobile; 1965–1985	Succeeded by office abolished
Preceded by Joseph N. Langan	93rd Mayor of Mobile; 1968–1969	Succeeded by Joseph A. Bailey
Preceded by Robert B. Doyle	96th Mayor of Mobile; 1972–1973	Succeeded by Gary A. Greenough
Preceded by Robert B. Doyle	99th Mayor of Mobile; 1976–1979	Succeeded by Gary A. Greenough
Preceded by Robert B. Doyle	104th Mayor of Mobile; 1984–1985	Succeeded by Arthur R. Outlaw
