= Sandy Stimpson =

American politician

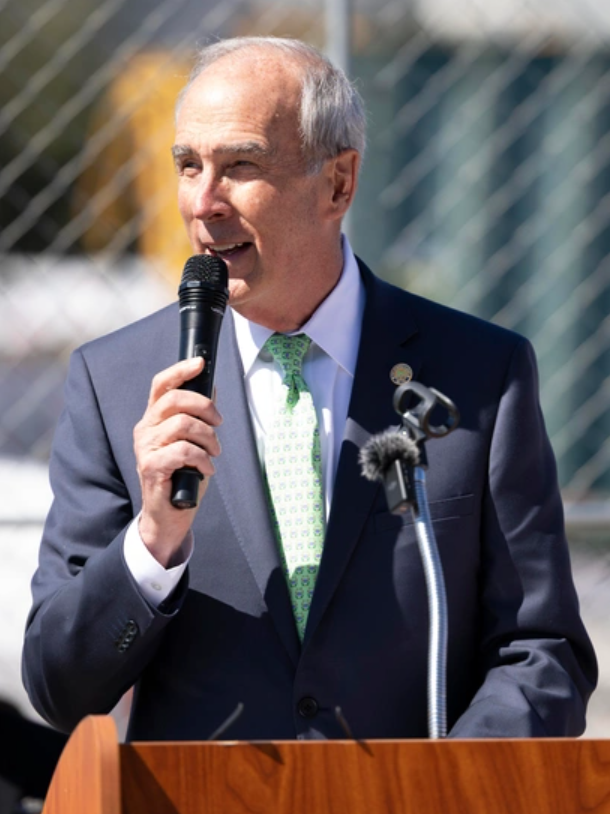

108th Mayor of Mobile
- In office November 4, 2013 – November 3, 2025
- Preceded by: Sam Jones
- Succeeded by: Spiro Cheriogotis

Personal details
- Born: April 4, 1952 (age 74) Mobile, Alabama, U.S.
- Party: Republican
- Spouse: Jean Miller (m. 1975)
- Children: 4
- Education: University of Alabama (BS)

William S. "Sandy" Stimpson (born April 4, 1952) is an American businessman and politician who served as the 108th mayor of Mobile, Alabama from 2013 to 2025.

He was elected August 27, 2013, defeating incumbent Mayor Sam Jones. In 2017, Stimpson was reelected over Jones in a rematch. In 2021, he defeated Fred Richardson and Karlos Finley with 62.5% of the vote. In 2025, he decided to not run for reelection.

== Personal life ==
Stimpson is a 1970 graduate of University Military School, now known as UMS-Wright. He received a B.S. in Civil Engineering from the University of Alabama in 1975, where he was a member of Delta Kappa Epsilon and Theta Tau Professional Engineering Fraternity.

Stimpson began a nearly 40-year career in his family's lumber manufacturing business. Starting at an early age, he worked his way up through virtually every position in the family business including serving as its CFO and ultimately its Executive Vice President.

Stimpson is married to Jean Miller of Brewton, Alabama. They have been married since 1975 and have four grown, married children and 14 grandchildren. They are longtime, active members of Ashland Place United Methodist Church.

Mayor Stimpson’s civic and business endeavors, both locally and statewide, have been numerous and varied. He has served on the boards of the Boys & Girls Club of Southwest Alabama; the Mobile Area Chamber of Commerce; the conservative think tank, the Alabama Policy Institute; the Business Council of Alabama; and the University of Alabama President’s Cabinet.

== Career ==
Upon graduating from the University of Alabama, Stimpson began a 37-year career with Gulf Lumber Company and its successor, Scotch & Gulf Lumber. He was chief financial officer prior to leaving the company to run for office in 2012.

=== Mayor of Mobile ===
He was elected August 27, 2013, with 54% of the vote, defeating incumbent Mayor Sam Jones. Stimpson ran on a platform of public safety and economic development. Stimpson was elected largely as a result of a surge in white voters, and received only single-digit support from African American voters.

In 2017, Stimpson was reelected with 59% of the vote over Jones in a rematch. He again polled in single digits with African American voters. In 2021, he defeated Fred Richardson and Karlos Finley with 62.5% of the vote. In 2025, he decided to not run for reelection.

Under Stimpson, Mobile has seen reductions in bonded indebtedness by nearly $100 million and unfunded liabilities for pension and benefits by $200 million, leading to credit rating increases from both Moody's and S&P. During the same period, he has maintained a two-month rainy day reserve fund. Stimpson and his team made changes to streamline and simplify the city procurement process, and launched the city’s first supplier diversity program. Stimpson and his team have introduced initiatives such as Map for Mobile and the city’s first supplier diversity program.

However, Stimpson has also repeatedly opposed environmental protection initiatives and health and safety legislation, despite severe pollution levels in Mobile. Stimpson's administration has systematically reduced funding for the arts and heritage, substantially reducing allocations to the Historic Mobile Preservation Society, the Mobile Arts Council, the Mobile Opera, the Mobile Symphony Orchestra, and other local museums, which led to a number of layoffs.
