= Mobile v. Bolden =

- Supreme Court of the United States

Argued March 19, 1979 Reargued October 29, 1979 Decided April 22, 1980
- Full case name: City of Mobile, Alabama, et al. v. Wiley L. Bolden, et al.
- Citations: 446 U.S. 55 (more) 100 S. Ct. 1490; 64 L. Ed. 2d 47

Case history
- Prior: Judgment for plaintiffs, 423 F. Supp. 384 (S.D. Ala. 1976); affirmed, 571 F.2d 238 (5th Cir. 1978), probable jurisdiction noted, 439 U.S. 815 (1978).

Holding
- Facially neutral electoral districting is constitutional, even if the at-large elections dilute the voting strength of black citizens.

Court membership
- Chief Justice Warren E. Burger Associate Justices William J. Brennan Jr. · Potter Stewart; Byron White · Thurgood Marshall; Harry Blackmun · Lewis F. Powell Jr. William Rehnquist · John P. Stevens

Case opinions
- Plurality: Stewart, joined by Burger, Powell, Rehnquist
- Concurrence: Blackmun (in result)
- Concurrence: Stevens (in judgment)
- Dissent: Brennan
- Dissent: White
- Dissent: Marshall

Laws applied
- U.S. Const. amends. XIV, XV; 79 Stat. 437, as amended, 42 U.S.C. 1973

Mobile v. Bolden, 446 U.S. 55 (1980), was a case in which the Supreme Court of the United States held that disproportionate effects alone, absent purposeful discrimination, are insufficient to establish a claim of racial discrimination affecting voting.

In Gomillion v. Lightfoot (1960), which challenged new city boundaries that excluded virtually all black voters from Tuskegee, Alabama, the court had held that creating electoral districts which disenfranchised African Americans violated the Fifteenth Amendment.

== Background ==
In 1911, the state legislature enacted a three-member city commission form of government for the city of Mobile, Alabama. With members elected at-large, the commission exercised all legislative, executive and administrative power. Since the entire city voted for each Commissioner, the white majority generally controlled the elections. At the time both African Americans and poor whites were effectively disenfranchised by practices of the 1901 state constitution.

In the late 1970s, a class-action suit was filed on behalf of all the city's black residents against the city and all three Commissioners by three young civil rights lawyers in Mobile, J.U. Blacksher, Larry Menefee and Gregory B. Stein. They received assistance from Edward Still of Birmingham and NAACP Legal Defense attorneys Jack Greenberg, James W. Nabrit III and Charles E. Williams. Their complaint alleged that the city's electoral system violated the Fourteenth and Fifteenth amendments and Section 2 of the Voting Rights Act of 1965, among other laws. The city hired C.B. Arendall, Jr, who assisted David A. Bagwell and S.R. Sheppard of the city's legal department. U.S. District Judge Virgil Pittman found for the city's black residents and the Court of Appeals affirmed. The form of city government was subsequently changed. (See below.)

The Supreme Court agreed to examine the issues to determine whether this at-large system violated Amendments Fourteen or Fifteen, or the Voting Rights Act.

== Opinion of the Court ==
The Court ruled 6-3 for the city of Mobile. In his plurality opinion, Justice Stewart concluded that the relevant language of the Voting Rights Act paralleled that of the Fifteenth Amendment. Citing Ashwander v. Tennessee Valley Authority the Court recounted the legislative history of Section 2 to bolster its conclusion that "this statutory provision adds nothing to the appellees' Fifteenth Amendment claim."

Stewart analyzed the Fifteenth Amendment claim, concluding in a plurality opinion that "facially neutral voting practices violate §2 only if motivated by a discriminatory purpose", of which the District Court had found no evidence.

Appellees argued that the effect of racially polarized voting was comparable to the exclusionary primaries held to be unconstitutional in Smith v. Allwright and Terry v. Adams but the Court found no evidence of a purposeful violation. At-large voting systems may inherently disfavor minority voters (especially in racially polarized states), however this is not in and of itself contrary to the Fifteenth Amendment, as long as the state does not obstruct minority voters.

Citing "the District Court's findings of fact, unquestioned on appeal, [that] make clear that Negroes register and vote in Mobile 'without hindrance,' and that there are no official obstacles in the way of Negroes who wish to become candidates for election to the Commission.", the Court rejected the Fifteenth Amendment claims.

The Court similarly rejected the Fourteenth Amendment claims and Justice Marshall's dissenting opinion in favor of finding such claims, stating, "Whatever appeal the dissenting opinion's view may have as a matter of political theory, it is not the law. The Equal Protection Clause of the Fourteenth Amendment does not require proportional representation as an imperative of political organization." Justice Blackmun concurred in the result, but believed the District Court had exceeded its discretion in its order for remedial action, believing the District Court had failed to consider alternative remedies. Justice Stevens concurred in the judgment concerning the constitutionality of Mobile's system, but applied a slightly different standard in his concurring opinion.

== Result ==
The Supreme Court remanded the case to the lower court for settlement. U.S. District Judge Virgil Pittman held a second hearing beginning May 1981, by which time the U.S. Department of Justice's Civil Rights Division also intervened on behalf of the plaintiffs, and the law firm of Hand, Arendall, Bedsole, Greaves, and Johnston represented the city. A "smoking gun" letter had been discovered and admitted into evidence—written by Mobile lawyer and Congressman Frederick G. Bromberg to the Alabama legislature in 1909, it advocated the at-large system in order to prevent African Americans from holding office. The district court proposed three single-member districts, noting that executive functions could not readily be separated among positions elected in this system. In addition, in this period Congress strengthened Section 2 of the Voting Rights Act with amendments changing the prohibition against "discriminatory intent" to creation of "discriminatory results" standard for use in evaluation of forms of government or electoral practices. In 2026, Republican appointed Justices Samuel Alito, Clarence Thomas, John Roberts, Neil Gorsuch, Brett Kavanaugh, and Amy Coney Barrett in Louisiana v. Callais reinstated Mobile v. Bolden against the amendment.

In 1985, Mobile's state legislators proposed a mayor-council form of government for the city, consisting of seven members to be elected from single-member districts, with the mayor to be elected at-large. By that time, Mobile was the last major city in Alabama to retain a city commission form of government. This change was approved by 72% of state voters, including formerly excluded African Americans and poor whites. The change to single-member districts enabled a wider range of candidates to enter politics at the local level. The three African Americans elected to the council that fall became the first African Americans to hold city office since Reconstruction. Since the change, many more African Americans, including black women, have won election to the Mobile city government.
