= List of people from Mobile, Alabama =

This is a list of notable people, past and present, who were born in, residents of, or otherwise closely associated with Mobile, Alabama:

== Literature ==
- Manda Collins, historical romance author
- Augusta Jane Evans, author
- Abby Fisher, cook, author
- Winston Groom, author, best known for Forrest Gump
- Melinda Haynes, author
- Roy Hoffman, author
- Michael Knight, university professor and author
- Anne Bozeman Lyon, writer
- William March, author and World War I veteran
- William P. McGivern, author
- Albert Murray, author
- Michelle Richmond, author
- Emma Langdon Roche, author and artist

== Arts and entertainment ==
- Curry Barker, YouTuber and film director
- Yolande Betbeze, Miss America 1951
- Dorothy E. Hayes, graphic designer, educator
- Bob Holly, professional wrestler known as "Hardcore Holly"
- Bill Moody, professional wrestling manager known as Percy Pringle and Paul Bearer
- Kathryn Morgan, ballet dancer
- Dan Povenmire, animator and co-creator of Phineas and Ferb
- Geoff Ramsey, co-founder of Rooster Teeth
- John Augustus Walker, artist known for his paintings and murals
- Eugene Walter, labeled "Mobile's Renaissance Man" for diverse activities in the arts; interred in 1998 in historic Church Street Graveyard by special resolution of the city

== Business ==
- Tim Cook, CEO of Apple Inc.
- George Washington Dennis, former slave, entrepreneur, real estate developer, and advocate for Black rights
- James M. Fail, chairman of Bluebonnet Savings Bank
- Lonnie Johnson, inventor of the Super Soaker
- Geoffrey Sauer, web publisher, theorist, and author

== Film and television ==
- Laverne Cox, actress and producer
- Phil Gordon, actor and dialect coach
- Connie Bea Hope, television personality
- Orlando Jones, comedian and actor
- Danny Lipford, contractor and TV host
- Jonathan Mangum, host, Let's Make a Deal
- Fayard Nicholas, dancer of the Nicholas Brothers
- Dan Povenmire, television director, television writer, and producer
- James "JT" Thomas Jr., million-dollar winner of Survivor: Tocantins
- Richard Tyson, film actor
- Curry Barker, film director of “Obsession”. Actor and director of YouTube skits.

== Historic ==
- Joseph Stillwell Cain, Jr., largely credited with the rebirth of Mardi Gras celebrations in Mobile after the Civil War; city celebrates Joe Cain Day on the Sunday before Mardi Gras
- Michael Donald, lynching victim
- Joseph Paul Franklin, serial killer
- Octavia Walton Le Vert, socialite and writer
- Cudjoe Lewis, last adult survivor of the Atlantic slave trade
- Florence Chandler Maybrick, born into a wealthy Mobile family, her mother remarried after her father's death and became Baroness von Roques; Florence married a British cotton factor, James Maybrick, and they lived at Battlecrease House in Aigburth, a suburb of Liverpool; both were known for their extramarital affairs; Florence was later found guilty of murdering her husband
- Alva Erskine Smith Vanderbilt, born and raised in Mobile, wife of Cornelius Vanderbilt's grandson William K. Vanderbilt and mother of Consuelo Spencer-Churchill, Duchess of Marlborough; known for building several of the most noted houses of the Gilded Era; later a crusader for the women's suffrage movement and the Equal Rights Amendment

== Military ==
- Lloyd Austin, 28th United States Secretary of Defense
- J. Gary Cooper, major general, US Marines
- Jeremiah Denton, admiral, United States Navy
- William Crawford Gorgas, physician and 22nd Surgeon General of the United States Army; known for his work in abating the transmission of yellow fever and malaria
- Gordon T. Gould, US Air Force lieutenant general
- Charles Keller, U.S. Army brigadier general and oldest Army officer to serve on active duty during World War II
- John D. New, United States Marine in World War II, only Mobile native to be awarded the Medal of Honor; Cottage Hill Park was renamed Medal of Honor Park in his honor, and Pixie Street was renamed PFC John D. New Drive
- Sidney Phillips, United States Marine, portrayed by Ashton Holmes in the HBO miniseries The Pacific
- Admiral Raphael Semmes, captain of the CSS Alabama during the American Civil War; resident of Mobile; the Mobile suburb of Semmes is named in his honor
- Eugene Sledge, United States Marine Corps, author of New York Times bestselling book With the Old Breed, portrayed by Joseph Mazzello in the HBO miniseries The Pacific, university professor, and World War II veteran
- Leighton W. Smith, Jr., admiral, U.S. Navy; in 1994, became commander-in-chief of U.S. Naval Forces Europe and Allied Forces Southern Europe

== Music ==
- Backwater, late 1970s jazz fusion band
- The Band Perry, sibling country music trio
- Billy Bang, jazz violinist and composer
- Eric Benét, singer and songwriter
- Vice Cooler, lead vocalist and songwriter for XBXRX
- Elley Duhé, singer and songwriter
- James Reese Europe, conductor and composer
- Red Clay Strays, Band
- Flo Milli, hip hop artist, rapper
- Urban Clifford "Urbie" Green, professional jazz trombonist
- Jimmy Hall, lead vocalist and harmonica player for Wet Willie
- Walker Hayes, country singer
- Will Kimbrough, vocalist, songwriter, musician and producer
- Allison Moorer, Oscar-nominated songwriter
- NoCap, hip hop artist, singer, rapper
- Bernard Odum, bass player, best known for performing in James Brown's band
- Terrance Quaites, aka TQ, R&B artist
- Rich Boy, rap and hip hop artist
- Rylo Rodriguez, rap and hip hop artist
- Ray Sawyer, lead vocalist of Dr. Hook & The Medicine Show
- Beverly Jo Scott, singer and songwriter
- John "Jabo" Starks, funk and rhythm and blues drummer
- Ward Swingle, jazz vocalist
- Fred Wesley, jazz and funk trombonist
- Cootie Williams, jazz and rhythm and blues trumpeter, performed with Duke Ellington and Benny Goodman
- Linda Zoghby, soprano, Metropolitan Opera

== Government and politics ==
- Bidwell Adam, lieutenant governor of Mississippi from 1928 to 1932, born in Mobile in 1894; raised in Pass Christian, Mississippi
- Robert Emmett Bledsoe Baylor, former U.S. Congressman for the 2nd District of Alabama
- Ann Bedsole, member of Alabama House of Representatives 1979–1983 and Alabama State Senate 1983–1995; candidate for governor 1995 and for mayor of Mobile, 2005
- Sanford Bishop, Democratic Party, member of the United States House of Representatives
- Jo Bonner, former U.S. representative from Alabama's 1st congressional district
- Frank Boykin, represented Mobile in Congress for 28 years
- Sonny Callahan, former U.S. Representative for the 1st District of Alabama
- Jerry Carl, former U.S. representative from Alabama's 1st congressional district
- Richard H. Clarke, former U.S. Representative for the 1st District of Alabama
- Mark E. Clayton, Democratic nominee for U.S. Senate from Tennessee in 2012; born in Mobile
- Margaret Conditt, Ohio State representative, a Republican member; born in Mobile
- Mike Dow, four-term mayor of Mobile
- Michael Figures, lawyer and politician
- Shomari Figures, U.S. representative from Alabama's 2nd congressional district
- Thomas Figures, first African American assistant district attorney and assistant United States attorney
- Vivian Davis Figures, Democratic member of the Alabama State Senate
- Alexis Herman, Democratic Party, served as the 23rd U.S. Secretary of Labor under President Bill Clinton
- Thomas H. Herndon, former U.S. Representative for the 1st District of Alabama
- Ethan Allen Hitchcock, U.S. minister to Russia under President William McKinley, U.S. Secretary of the Interior under President Theodore Roosevelt
- Samuel L. Jones, Democratic Party, elected as in 2005 as Mobile's first African American mayor
- Vivian Malone Jones, director in the EPA, integrated the University of Alabama and was its first black graduate
- Yvonne Kennedy, Alabama state representative, president of Bishop State Community College, and national president of Delta Sigma Theta sorority
- Sybil I. McLaughlin, first clerk and speaker in the Cayman Islands government
- Bert Nettles, Republican former member of the Alabama House of Representatives from Mobile; subsequently a lawyer in Birmingham
- Joseph M. Proskauer, lawyer, judge, philanthropist, and political activist
- William Holcombe "Bill" Pryor, Jr., Republican Party, former attorney general of Alabama; federal judge on the United States Court of Appeals for the Eleventh Circuit
- Jeff Sessions, Republican Party, formerly attorney general of Alabama; United States Senator
- Donald Eugene Siegelman, Democratic Party, only person in Alabama history elected to serve in all four top statewide offices: secretary of state, attorney general, lieutenant governor and governor
- Tom Turnipseed, executive director of George Wallace's 1968 presidential campaign who became a liberal activist in South Carolina, born in Mobile

== Religious ==
- Clara Ester, civil rights activist and United Methodist deaconess
- Oscar Hugh Lipscomb, first archbishop of Mobile (Roman Catholic) and its eighth bishop
- Alexander Lyons, rabbi
- Dominic Manucy, third bishop of Mobile
- Adolph S. Moses, rabbi of Congregation Sha'arai Shomayim
- Michael Portier, first bishop of Mobile
- Abram Joseph Ryan, poet, Roman Catholic priest at St. Mary's parish; known as "poet-priest of the South"
- Thomas Joseph Toolen, sixth bishop of Mobile

== Athletics ==
Mobile is the birthplace of five members of the Baseball Hall of Fame. Only New York City and Chicago can claim to be the birthplace of more members of the hall.

- Hank Aaron, member of the Baseball Hall of Fame and 2nd on the all-time home run list; Hank Aaron Stadium and the Hank Aaron Loop in Mobile are named in his honor
- Tommie Aaron, Major League Baseball player
- Bill Adair, Major League Baseball and manager
- Terry Adams, Major League Baseball player
- Willie Anderson, offensive lineman for Cincinnati Bengals
- Frank Bolling, Major League Baseball player
- Scott Bolton, wide receiver, Green Bay Packers
- Robert Brazile, NFL player
- Jason Caffey, Chicago Bulls, NBA
- Daphne Corboz, Ligue 1 soccer midfielder for Paris FC since 2020
- Maël Corboz, 2. Bundesliga soccer midfielder and captain of Arminia Bielefeld since 2024
- Rachel Corboz, Ligue 1 soccer midfielder for AS Saint-Étienne since 2025
- DeMarcus Cousins, NBA player for Sacramento Kings
- Dameyune Craig, quarterback for Auburn University and Carolina Panthers; assistant coach for Auburn
- Rick Crawford, racing driver
- Fennis Dembo, forward, played for the NBA world champion Detroit Pistons in 1989
- Nick Fairley, defensive tackle for Detroit Lions
- Cale Gale, NASCAR driver for KHI
- Lindsey Harding, WNBA player and coach
- Paul Harris, player for Tampa Bay Buccaneers and Minnesota Vikings
- Alex Herman, player for Memphis Red Sox
- Margaret Holgerson, All-American Girls Professional Baseball League player
- Destin Hood, MLB player for the Miami Marlins
- Pat Howell, MLB player
- Scott Hunter, NFL player
- Chevis Jackson, NFL defensive back, Atlanta Falcons, alumnus of LSU
- Shemar James, American footballer
- Aron Jóhannsson, American footballer, SV Werder Bremen and United States men's national soccer team
- Cleon Jones, MLB outfielder, New York Mets
- Antonio Lang, Duke and NBA player
- Tamaurice "Tee" Martin, University of Tennessee, NFL and CFL quarterback; led Tennessee to undefeated season (13–0) and 1998 National Championship
- Keith McCants, NFL, defensive lineman, Tampa Bay Buccaneers
- A. J. McCarron, quarterback for Alabama
- Willie McCovey, member of the Baseball Hall of Fame
- Henry Monroe, NFL defensive back, Green Bay Packers and Philadelphia Eagles
- William Moody, professional wrestling manager known for his time in WWE under the name Paul Bearer
- Sterling Moore, NFL cornerback
- Amos Otis, MLB player
- Satchel Paige, baseball pitcher, member of the Baseball Hall of Fame; Satchel Paige Drive in Mobile is named in his honor
- Jake Peavy, baseball pitcher, winner of Cy Young Award
- Juan Pierre, MLB player
- Ted Radcliffe, professional baseball player in the Negro Leagues
- Donald Reese, NFL player, Miami Dolphins and New Orleans Saints
- JaMarcus Russell, quarterback for LSU and Oakland Raiders
- Chris Samuels, NFL lineman and football coach
- Ozzie Smith, MLB shortstop, member of Baseball Hall of Fame
- Dewarick Spencer, basketball player for European professional teams
- Jaquiski Tartt, NFL safety for the San Francisco 49ers
- Erick Walder, track-and-field long jumper
- Jimmie Ward, NFL cornerback for the San Francisco 49ers
- Turner Ward, MLB baseball player
- Billy Williams, MLB left fielder, coach, member of Baseball Hall of Fame
- Sherman Williams, NFL
- T. J. Yeldon, Jacksonville, Jaguars, NFL
- Bubba Wallace, NASCAR driver for 23XI Racing
- Bryce Huff, NFL Linebacker for the San Francisco 49ers

== Science ==
- Gregory Benford, physicist, science fiction author
- Regina Benjamin, physician, medical director, former Surgeon General of the United States
- Archie Carr, herpetologist, ecologist, conservationist, and writer on science and nature
- Anne Haney Cross, neurologist and neuroimmunologist
- Kathryn P. Hire, captain, United States Naval Reserve, NASA astronaut
- George Bigelow Rogers, architect
- Alfreda Johnson Webb, professor of biology and doctor of veterinary medicine
- E. O. Wilson, biologist, naturalist, ecologist, and entomologist known for developing the field of sociobiology
