= Senator Figures =

Senator Figures may refer to:

- Michael A. Figures (1947–1996), Alabama State Senate
- Vivian Davis Figures (born 1957), Alabama State Senate
