= Shomari Figures =

American politician (born 1985)

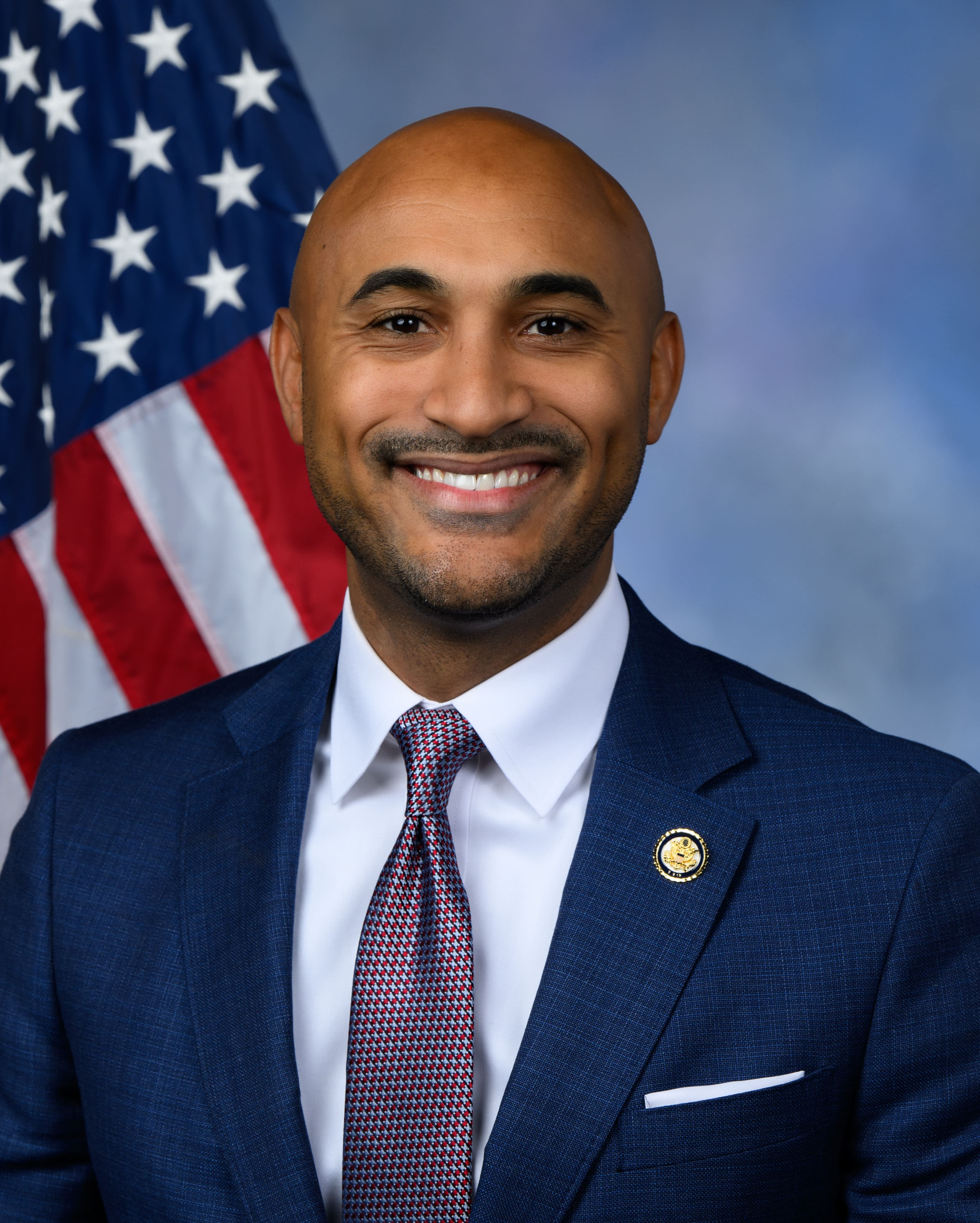
- Official portrait, 2025

Member of the U.S. House of Representatives from Alabama's 2nd district
- Incumbent
- Assumed office January 3, 2025
- Preceded by: Barry Moore (redistricted)

Personal details
- Born: Shomari Coleman Figures; September 3, 1985 (age 41) Mobile, Alabama, U.S.
- Party: Democratic
- Spouse: Kalisha Dessources (m. 2018)
- Children: 4
- Parents: Michael Figures; Vivian Davis Figures
- Relatives: Thomas Figures (uncle)
- Education: University of Alabama (BA, JD)
- Website: House website Campaign website

Shomari Coleman Figures (born September 3, 1985) is an American politician and attorney serving as the U.S. representative from Alabama's 2nd congressional district since 2025. A member of the Democratic Party, Figures was first elected in 2024.

== Early life and education ==
Shomari Coleman Figures was born in Mobile, Alabama, on September 3, 1985. Figures is the son of Michael Figures, a civil rights attorney and member of the Alabama Senate, and Vivian Davis Figures, who succeeded her husband in the Alabama Senate after his death. His father was the attorney of Beulah Mae Donald whose son, Michael, was lynched by members of the United Klans of America. Donald was awarded $7 million dollars, which bankrupted the organization.

Figures was raised in Mobile, where he attended Council Elementary School and Phillips Middle School before graduating from LeFlore Magnet High School. He attended the University of Alabama and earned a Bachelor of Arts in criminal justice and history in 2006 and the University of Alabama School of Law, earning a Juris Doctor in 2010.

== Career ==
After law school, Figures served as a law clerk for Nannette A. Baker of the U.S. District Court for the Eastern District of Missouri. He next worked for Barack Obama's 2012 reelection campaign as a field organizer in Akron, Ohio. He subsequently served as domestic director of the White House Presidential Personnel Office in the Obama administration before becoming the White House liaison to Loretta Lynch, the attorney general of the United States. Figures later became legislative counsel for U.S. Senator Sherrod Brown (OH) and worked on the presidential transition of Joe Biden. He subsequently served as deputy chief of staff and counsellor to Attorney General Merrick Garland until resigning in October 2023.

== U.S. House of Representatives ==
=== Elections ===
==== 2024 ====
Alabama's 2nd congressional district (2025–2027)

Following Allen v. Milligan, the Supreme Court ruled that Alabama's previous map violated the Voting Rights Act, because it dispersed the Black population, preventing voters from electing their choice of representative. To reflect the demographics of the state, the Court ordered Alabama to redraw its congressional maps to have an additional Black district. Alabama's 2nd congressional district was redrawn to reflect a contiguous Black majority.

In November 2023, Figures declared his candidacy to represent Alabama's 2nd congressional district in the United States House of Representatives in the 2024 elections. In the Democratic primary, he led the 11-candidate field with 44% of the vote and advanced to a mid-April runoff election against Alabama House Minority Leader Anthony Daniels. In the primary race, cryptocurrency political action committees spent millions to elect him and months after the primary, Figures asked the Democratic National Committee to adopt more pro-crypto policies in addition to encouraging Kamala Harris to select a "pro-innovation" Securities and Exchange Commission chair and a vice presidential candidate "sophisticated in digital asset policy".

Figures defeated Daniels with 61% of the vote in the April runoff election. Figures spoke at the 2024 Democratic National Convention. He defeated Republican Caroleene Dobson to win election to Congress.

==== 2026 ====
In April 2026, the Supreme Court issued a ruling in Louisiana v. Callais that weakened the Voting Rights Act. Following the ruling, the 2nd district was redrawn to be more favorable towards Republicans. Nonetheless, Figures defeated Republican candidate Rhett Marques in the general election 54% to 46% percentage points.

=== Tenure ===
Figures was sworn into the 119th Congress on January 3, 2025. During his first term, he was appointed to the Agriculture and Transportation and Infrastructure committees.

In 2025, Figures introduced the bipartisan Rural Hospital Stabilization Act, which would provide federal grants to support rural hospitals. He also co-introduced the Bridge to Medicaid Act with Representative Terri Sewell, legislation that would provide temporary health care subsidies for individuals in the Medicaid coverage gap in states that have not expanded Medicaid. He later co-introduced that year the bipartisan Student Compensation and Opportunity through Rights and Endorsements (SCORE) Act, which would establish a federal framework governing college athletes' compensation from their name, image, and likeness.

In 2026, Figures introduced the Affordable Youth Enrichment Opportunities Act, legislation that would create a federal tax deduction for eligible parents' out-of-pocket expenses for children's extracurricular activities, including sports, arts programs, and academic enrichment activities. Later that year, he introduced the Tuskegee Airmen Memorial Act, legislation that would authorize the construction of a memorial in Washington, D.C., honoring the Tuskegee Airmen, with funding provided by the Tuskegee Airmen Inc. rather than federal funds. The bill received bipartisan support from the other members of Alabama's congressional delegation, who joined as cosponsors.

=== Committee assignments ===
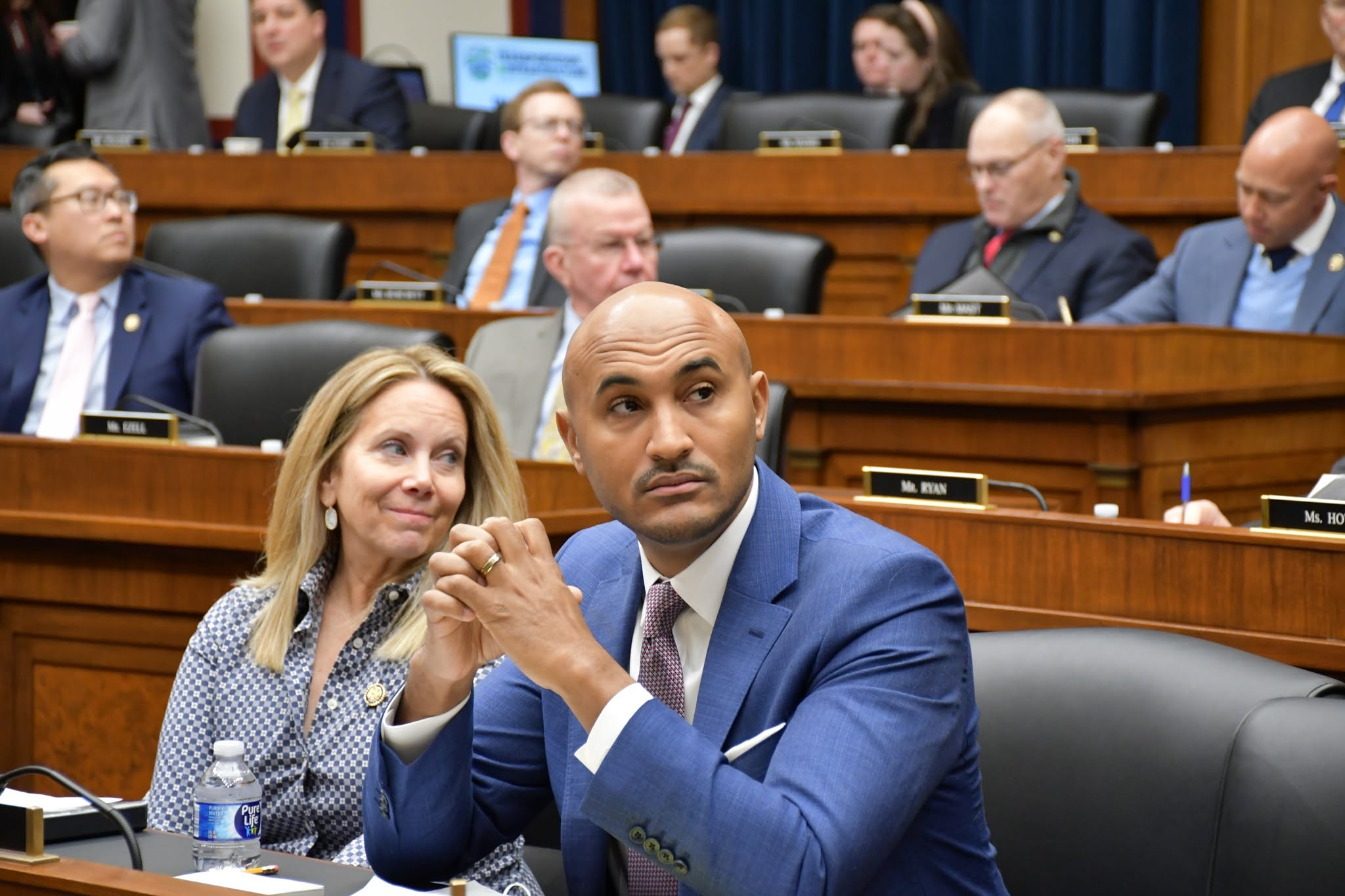
Figures on the Transportation and Infrastructure Committee, 2025

For the 119th Congress:

- Committee on Agriculture
  - Subcommittee on Commodity Markets, Digital Assets, and Rural Development
  - Subcommittee on Nutrition and Foreign Agriculture (vice ranking member)
- Committee on Transportation and Infrastructure
  - Subcommittee on Economic Development, Public Buildings and Emergency Management
  - Subcommittee on Highways and Transit (vice ranking member)
  - Subcommittee on Water Resources and Environment

=== Caucus memberships ===
Figures' caucus memberships include:

- Future Forum
- New Democrat Coalition (Transportation Task Force, chair)
- Congressional Black Caucus
- Congressional Trucking Caucus (co-chair)

== Political positions ==
=== Education ===
On December 9, 2025, Figures voted in favor of the Secure Rural Schools Reauthorization Act of 2025. The act passed overwhelmingly in the chamber, passing in a vote of 399–5. The act extends federal payments to rural counties to support schools, roads, and local services.

=== Healthcare ===
Figures supports expanding Medicaid in Alabama and has advocated federal assistance for rural hospitals, arguing that access to local hospitals is important for both health care and economic development. Figures was a co-sponsor of the Medicare for All Act.

== Personal life ==
Figures met Kalisha Dessources in 2014 while they both worked at the White House. They married on December 2, 2018, and have four children. They live in Mobile, Alabama. He is a Protestant.

== Electoral history ==
2024 Alabama's 4th congressional district Democratic primary results, First round
Party	Candidate	Votes	%
Democratic	Shomari Figures	24,980	43.4
Democratic	Anthony Daniels	12,879	22.4
Democratic	Napoleon Bracy Jr.	9,010	15.7
Democratic	Merika Coleman	3,445	6.0
Democratic	Phyllis Harvey-Hall	2,007	3.5
Democratic	James Averhart	1,623	2.8
Democratic	Jeremy Gray	1,580	2.7
Democratic	Juandalynn Givan	1,261	2.2
Democratic	Vimal Patel	289	0.5
Democratic	Larry Darnell Simpson	247	0.4
Democratic	Willie Lenard	199	0.3
Total votes		57,520	100.0

2024 Alabama's 2nd congressional district Democratic primary runoff results
Party	Candidate	Votes	%
Democratic	Shomari Figures	21,926	61.0
Democratic	Anthony Daniels	13,990	39.0
Total votes		35,916	100.0

2024 Alabama's 2nd congressional district election
Party	Candidate	Votes	%
Democratic	Shomari Figures	158,041	54.56%
Republican	Caroleene Dobson	131,414	45.37%
Write-in		219	0.07%
Total votes		289,674	100.00
Democratic gain from Republican			

U.S. House of Representatives
Preceded by Barry Moore; Redistricted	Member of the U.S. House of Representatives from Alabama's 2nd congressional district 2025–present	Incumbent
U.S. order of precedence (ceremonial)
Preceded by Julie Fedorchak	United States representatives by seniority 379th	Succeeded by Laura Friedman
