= Buskey =

Buskey is a surname. Notable people with the surname include:

- James Buskey (1937–2024), American politician
- Joe Buskey (1902–1949), American baseball player
- Mike Buskey (born 1949), American baseball player
- Tom Buskey (1947–1998), American baseball player
