= Thomas Figures =

American attorney and judge (1944–2015)

- Born: August 6, 1944; Mobile, Alabama, US
- Died: January 22, 2015 (aged 70); Mobile, Alabama, US
- Education: Alabama State University (B.A.); Indiana University Bloomington (M.B.A.); University of Illinois at Urbana-Champaign (JD)
- Relatives: Michael Figures (brother); Shomari Figures (nephew)

Thomas Henry Figures (August 6, 1944 – January 22, 2015) was an American attorney and judge. He was the first African American assistant district attorney and assistant United States Attorney from Mobile, Alabama. Figures earned convictions on two members of the Ku Klux Klan for the lynching of Michael Donald and testified before the Senate Judiciary Committee against the judicial nomination of Jeff Sessions.

== Early life ==
Figures grew up in Mobile, Alabama, and graduated from Central High School in 1962. He attended the Mobile Branch of Alabama State College, now known as Bishop State Community College and transferred to Alabama State University (ASU) and served as president of the Student Government Association. He graduated second in his class in 1966. Figures enrolled in the Master of Business Administration program at Indiana University Bloomington and earned a Juris Doctor from University of Illinois Urbana-Champaign.

== Career ==
After he graduated, Figures worked as legal counsel for Mobil Oil in New York and became an assistant district attorney in Westchester County, New York. He then returned to Mobile and became the first African American assistant district attorney in Mobile County.

In 1978, Figures became an assistant United States Attorney. In that role, he prosecuted two members of the Ku Klux Klan for the lynching of Michael Donald. The FBI was about to close the investigation when Figures insisted that they reopen it, finding evidence that led them to the two suspects, who were arrested in 1983 and convicted of murder. Michael Figures, Thomas' brother, and Morris Dees of the Southern Poverty Law Center represented Donald's mother, Beulah Mae Donald, in a civil suit for wrongful death against the United Klans of America (UKA). They won a $7 million judgment ($19,837,434 in current dollar terms) against the UKA in 1987, bankrupting the organization.

Figures resigned in 1985 in protest of United States Attorney Jeff Sessions' prosecution of community activists in Perry County, including Albert Turner, for voter fraud. In 1986, President Ronald Reagan nominated Sessions to the federal judiciary. Figures came forward with allegations of Sessions' behavior, such as referring to Figures as "boy" and the NAACP as "un-American", which Sessions said were "absolutely untrue". Figures also said that Sessions had said that he believed the Ku Klux Klan "was OK until I found out they smoked pot", which Sessions claimed was a joke. Figures testified about his experience working with Sessions in front of the Senate Judiciary Committee, which rejected the nomination.

In 1992, Figures was indicted on one count of bribery for allegedly offering $50,000 and other assistance to a witness in a drug case not to testify that he was working as a defense attorney. Figures alleged that he had been indicted as revenge for his testimony against Sessions; Sessions denied the allegation and transferred the prosecution to the U.S. Department of Justice. Figures pleaded not guilty and was acquitted at trial.

Governor Fob James removed two members of the ASU's board of trustees and appointed Figures to one of the positions on September 30, 1998. However, the removed members were restored to the board by a court ruling and he was removed in November. He appealed the decision to the Alabama Supreme Court and the ruling against him was affirmed. Governor Don Siegelman appointed Figures to the board of trustees in 2002. His term ended in 2014.

In 2007, Sam Jones, the mayor of Mobile, appointed Figures to serve as a municipal judge.

== Personal life ==
Figures and his wife, Janice, married in 1987. She filed for divorce in 1991. Figures died on January 22, 2015, at the age of 70.
