= Pass Christian High School =

Public school in Pass Christian, Mississippi

Location
- 720 W. North Street; Pass Christian, Harrison County, Mississippi 39571; United States; 30.31436°N 89.2539°W

Information
- Type: Public
- School district: Pass Christian School District
- NCES District ID: 2803510
- Superintendent: Carla J. Evers
- NCES School ID: 280351000684
- Principal: Tiffany Lindmark
- Grades: 9-12
- Enrollment: 604
- Student to teacher ratio: 12.86
- Colors: Scarlet red, Royal blue, White
- Mascot: Pirate
- Website: pchs.pc.k12.ms.us

Pass Christian High School is a public high school in Pass Christian, Mississippi. It serves grades 9 to 12 and enrollment in 2026 was 525 students. It is the only high school in the Pass Christian Public School District. In 2025 it was the second highest ranked public school in the state.

== Testing and demographics ==
Test scores in math and reading are above state averages. About half the student body is economically disadvantaged. In 2026 the student body was about 60 percent white and 20 percent black with another 10 percent categorized as of two or more "races".

== Athletics ==
Pirates are the school mascot. 2025 was the 42nd year for its football team the first regional championship victory for the team. It hosts the Cory McGee Classic track and field competition named for Olympian Cory McGee. In 2026, several of its track and field athletes were 4A state champions and set records in the division.

== History ==
The Old Pass Christian High School building was a Mississippi Landmark. It was destroyed by Hurricane Katrina in 2005. A historical marker at the site commemorates its history.

African American students attended Harrison County Training School which became J.W. Randolph School. After desegregation its building was used as Pass Christian Middle School. It is listed on the National Register of Historic Places.

In 2005, the school received national media attention following Hurricane Katrina.

In 2014, Pass Christian High School was named the top high school in Mississippi.

In 2025, alumnus Robin Roberts visited the rebuilt high school on a tour of the area's recovery after Hurricane Katrina.

== Alumni ==
- Cory McGee, Olympic runner
- Robin Roberts (1979), newscaster

== See also ==
- List of high schools in Mississippi
