= 2008 United States Senate election in Alabama =

2008 election in United States

- November 4, 2008
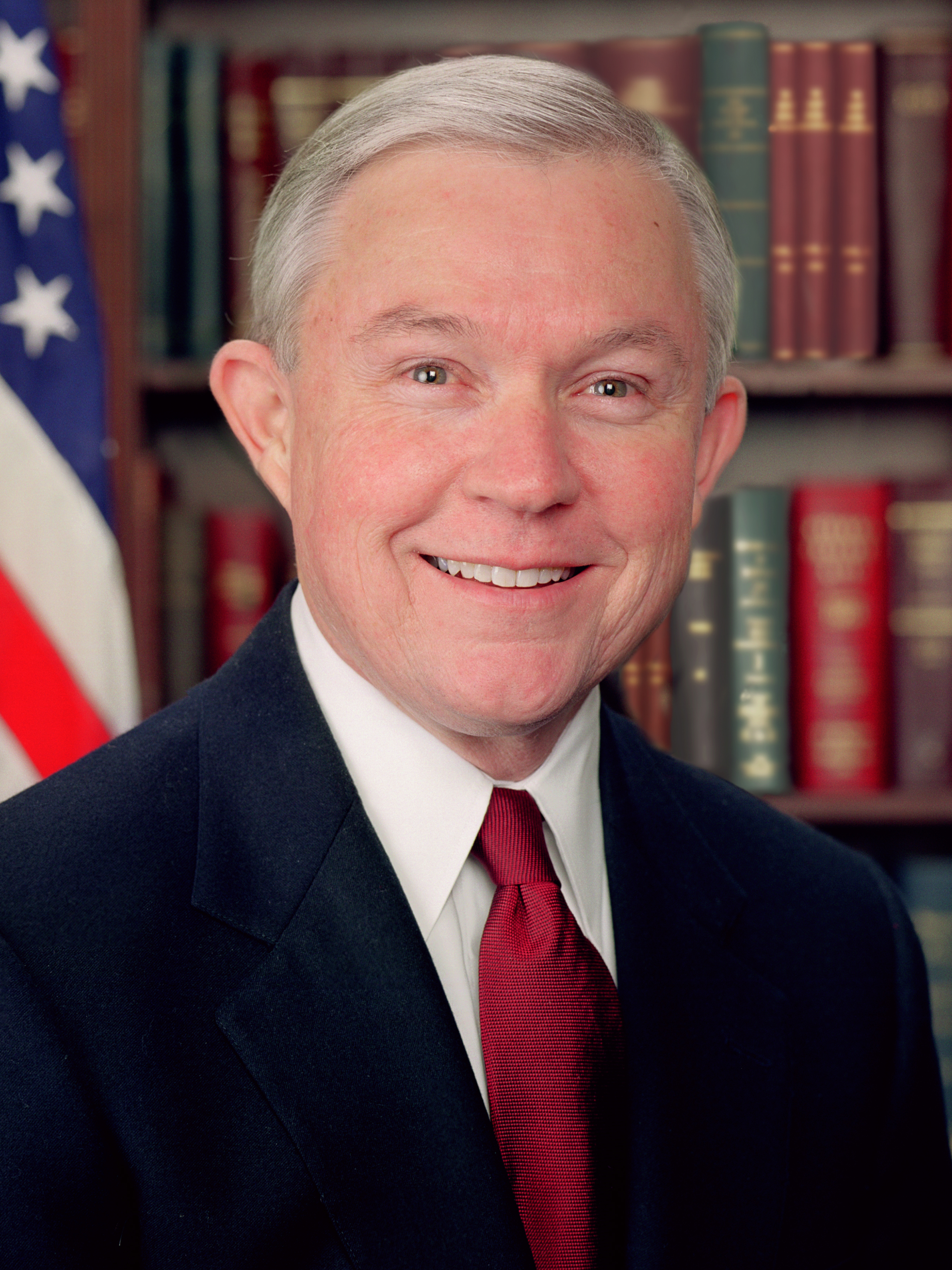

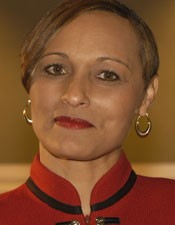
Nominee	Jeff Sessions	Vivian Davis Figures
Party	Republican	Democratic
Popular vote	1,305,383	752,391
Percentage	63.36%	36.52%
- Sessions: 50–60% 60–70% 70–80% 80–90% 90% Figures: 50–60% 60–70% 70–80% 80–90% 90% Tie: 50%
U.S. senator before election
Jeff Sessions
Republican
Elected U.S. Senator
Jeff Sessions
Republican

The 2008 United States Senate election in Alabama was held on November 4, 2008, to elect a member of the United States Senate to represent the state of Alabama. Republican incumbent Jeff Sessions won re-election to a third term, defeating Democratic State Senator Vivian Davis Figures.

== Background ==
On January 10, 2007, Rep. Artur Davis announced that he would not run for the seat. Despite voting heavily for George W. Bush in 2004, Alabama still had a strong Democratic presence in 2008, and Democrats controlled majorities in both chambers in the Alabama Legislature. Commissioner of Agriculture and Industries Ron Sparks appeared to be preparing for a run, but on June 12, 2007, he announced that he would not seek the Senate seat, in order to avoid a primary battle with State Senator Vivian Davis Figures.

Primary elections were held on June 3.

== Republican primary ==
=== Candidates ===
==== Nominee ====
- Jeff Sessions, incumbent U.S. senator (1997–2017)

==== Eliminated in primary ====
- Earl Mack Gavin, perennial candidate

=== Results ===
Republican primary results
Party	Candidate	Votes	%
Republican	Jeff Sessions (incumbent)	199,690	92.27%
Republican	Earl Mack Gavin	16,718	7.73%
Total votes		216,408	100.00%

== Democratic primary ==
=== Candidates ===
==== Nominee ====
- Vivian Davis Figures, state senator from SD-33 (1997–present)

==== Eliminated in primary ====
- Johnny Swanson, Army veteran
- Mark Townsend, candidate for governor in 2002

=== Results ===
Primary results by county Figures: ≥90%; 80–90%; 70–80%; 60–70%; 50–60%; 40–50%; 30–40%; Townsend: 40–50%

Democratic primary results
Party	Candidate	Votes	%
Democratic	Vivian Davis Figures	112,074	63.72%
Democratic	Johnny Swanson	38,757	22.03%
Democratic	Mark Townsend	25,058	14.25%
Total votes		175,889	100.00%

== Independents ==
=== Candidates ===
- Darryl W. Perry (write-in), perennial candidate

== General election ==
=== Predictions ===
Source	Ranking	As of
The Cook Political Report	Safe R	October 23, 2008
CQ Politics	Safe R	October 31, 2008
Rothenberg Political Report	Safe R	November 2, 2008
Real Clear Politics	Safe R	November 4, 2008

=== Polling ===
Poll source	Date(s) administered	Sample size (Note: Key: A – all adults RV – registered voters LV – likely voters V – unclear)	Margin of error	Jeff Session (R)	Vivian Figures (D)	Other	Undecided
SurveyUSA (Note: Poll sponsored by WKRG-TV Mobile-Pensacola)	October 27–28, 2008	650 (LV)	± 3.7%	65%	32%	–	3%
SurveyUSA	October 9–10, 2008	697 (LV)	± 3.6%	64%	33%	–	3%
Rasmussen Reports	September 22, 2008	500 (LV)	± 4.5%	59%	30%	4%	8%
SurveyUSA	September 16–17, 2008	655 (LV)	± 3.7%	66%	31%	–	3%
Rasmussen Reports	July 31, 2008	500 (LV)	–	58%	31%	–	11%
Rasmussen Reports	June 26, 2008	500 (LV)	–	58%	34%	–	8%
Rasmussen Reports	May 27, 2008	500 (LV)	± 4.5%	62%	29%	1%	8%
Rasmussen Reports	April 2, 2008	500 (LV)	± 4.5%	57%	36%	3%	4%
SurveyUSA	August 25–27, 2007	530 RV)	± 4.3%	59%	37%	–	4%

== Results ==
2008 United States Senate election in Alabama
Party	Candidate	Votes	%
Republican	Jeff Sessions (incumbent)	1,305,383	63.36%
Democratic	Vivian Davis Figures	752,391	36.52%
Write-in		2,417	0.12%
Total votes		2,060,191	100.00%
Republican hold			

=== Counties that flipped from Democratic to Republican ===
- Marengo (largest municipality: Linden)
- Pickens (largest city: Aliceville)
- Colbert (largest city: Muscle Shoals)
- Lawrence (largest city: Moulton)

=== Counties that flipped from Republican to Democratic ===
- Montgomery (largest municipality: Montgomery)

== See also ==
- 2008 United States elections

== Notes ==
Partisan clients
