= DeLisle, Mississippi =

- Census-designated place
- Location within Mississippi Location within the United States
- Coordinates: 30°22′44″N 89°16′5″W
- Country: United States
- State: Mississippi
- County: Harrison

Area
  - Total: 5.34 sq mi (13.84 km^{2})
  - Land: 5.23 sq mi (13.55 km^{2})
  - Water: 0.12 sq mi (0.30 km^{2})
- Elevation: 23 ft (7.0 m)

Population (2020)
  - Total: 1,275
  - Density: 243.7/sq mi (94.11/km^{2})
- Time zone: UTC-6 (Central (CST))
  - Summer (DST): UTC-5 (CDT)
- FIPS code: 28-18420

DeLisle (/dəˈlɪl, dəˈliːl/) is a census-designated place (CDP) in Harrison County, Mississippi, United States. It is part of the Gulfport–Biloxi Metropolitan Statistical Area. As of the 2020 census, DeLisle had a population of 1,275.

== History ==
Pierre Le Moyne d'Iberville was chosen by Louis Phélypeaux, comte de Pontchartrain, Louis XIV's minister of Marine, to establish a French colony in the area. On d'Iberville's second trip to the Gulf in 1699-1700, d'Iberville was accompanied by the accomplished royal cartographer, Compte Guillaume Delisle. During this expedition, they charted and named Bayou Portage, Bayou Arcadia, and Bayou Delisle. The unincorporated area north of the bayou, known as DeLisle, shares a zip code with Pass Christian, Mississippi, but is not within the city limits. The early settlement was called La Riviere des Loups (Wolf River). The earliest verifiable records for the DeLisle area show that Barthelome Grelot was followed by his brother-in-law Philipe Saucier, who received two Spanish land grants; one in the St. Louis Bay area, recorded on August 27, 1781, followed in 1794, with a second tract that was situated on Bayou DeLisle, adjacent to his brother-in-law, Bartholome Grelot. These early French settlers were soon joined by Jean Baptiste Nicaise, Pierre Moran, Ramon Lizana, Chevalier DeDeaux, Jean Cassibry, and Charles Ladner.

A post office operated under the name DeLisle from 1884 to 1974.

DuPont opened a titanium dioxide plant in DeLisle in 1979. This plant, now operated by Chemours, is the second-largest producer of titanium dioxide in the world.

== Geography ==
DeLisle is located on the north side of DeLisle Bayou and the Wolf River, which separate the community from the city of Pass Christian.

According to the United States Census Bureau, the CDP has a total area of 5.3 square miles (13.8 km^{2}), of which 5.2 square miles (13.5 km^{2}) is land and 0.12 square miles (0.3 km^{2}), or 2.13%, is water.

== Demographics ==
Historical population
Census	Pop.	Note	%±
2010	1,147		—
2020	1,275		11.2%
U.S. Decennial Census

DeLisle first appeared as a census designated place in the 2010 U.S. census.

=== Racial and ethnic composition ===
DeLisle CDP, Mississippi – Racial and ethnic composition Note: the US Census treats Hispanic/Latino as an ethnic category. This table excludes Latinos from the racial categories and assigns them to a separate category. Hispanics/Latinos may be of any race.
Race / Ethnicity (NH = Non-Hispanic)	Pop 2010	Pop 2020	% 2010	% 2020
White alone (NH)	612	690	53.36%	54.12%
Black or African American alone (NH)	466	478	40.63%	37.49%
Native American or Alaska Native alone (NH)	0	5	0.00%	0.39%
Asian alone (NH)	12	7	1.05%	0.55%
Native Hawaiian or Pacific Islander alone (NH)	0	0	0.00%	0.00%
Other race alone (NH)	5	9	0.44%	0.71%
Mixed race or Multiracial (NH)	25	51	2.18%	4.00%
Hispanic or Latino (any race)	27	35	2.35%	2.75%
Total	1,147	1,275	100.00%	100.00%

=== 2020 census ===
As of the 2020 United States census, there were 1,275 people, 440 households, and 304 families residing in the CDP.

== Notable people ==
- Beulah Mae Donald, Civil Rights activist
- Matteo Martinolich, shipbuilder
- Jesmyn Ward, author; recipient of the 2011 and the 2017 National Book Awards for Fiction.
