= James Buskey =

American politician (1937–2024)

Member of the Alabama House of Representatives from the 99th district
- In office 1976–2018
- Succeeded by: Sam Jones

Personal details
- Born: April 10, 1937 Greenville, Alabama, U.S.
- Died: November 8, 2024 (aged 87)
- Party: Democratic
- Profession: Educator

James E. Buskey (April 10, 1937 – November 8, 2024) was an American politician. He was a member of the Alabama House of Representatives from the 99th District, serving from 1976 to 2018. He was a member of the Democratic party.

In 1997, Buskey ran in the special election to succeed Michael Figures in the Alabama Senate. He lost to Vivian Davis Figures.

Buskey died on November 8, 2024, at the age of 87.
