= Douglas Wicks =

American politician

Douglas M. Wicks

Mobile County Commissioner, District 1
- In office 1980–1987
- Succeeded by: Sam Jones

Personal details
- Born: Mobile, Alabama
- Political party: Democratic

Douglas M. Wicks is a politician in Mobile County, Alabama. Elected to the Mobile County Commission in 1980, he was the first African American to hold that position since Reconstruction. In 1987 he was found guilty of four counts of extortion of persons doing business with the county, despite at least one person denying they were extorted; another being an FBI informant sent to coax Wicks into stating wrongdoing, and failing to do so; and a lack of physical evidence of money exchanging hands. The charges were filed by then federal prosecutor Jeff Sessions just two days after having been denied federal judgeship, in part due to allegations by Wicks that Sessions had made racist comments towards him. Wicks received a 15-year prison sentence but was released in 1992, having served five years of his sentence. He lost a comeback bid for his old seat in 2000 to Sam Jones, who later served eight years as Mobile's mayor. His successor, Sam Jones, would go on to serve 18 years in office, and was elected as the first African American mayor of Mobile in 2005.

Wicks was the 1974 "King of MAMGA", the African American organization which elects a Mardi Gras King to preside over the city each year. His queen was future Secretary of Labor Alexis Herman.
