= Matteo Martinolich =

Matteo Martinolich (10 February 1860 - 23 December 1934) was an American master shipbuilder. He was the first to use Mississippi pine in the building of seagoing vessels, which was approved by the Marine Underwriters.

Born in Mali Lošinj, Croatia (at the time part of the Austro-Hungarian Empire), the son of Francesco Stanislao Martinolich and Maria Dominica Merlo, he initially studied naval architecture and received training in carpentry at the Austrian naval shipyards in Pola (present-day Pula, Croatia). At that time, Pola was the chief naval base of the Austro-Hungarian Empire.

He arrived in the United States at the age of 23, landing in New Orleans with his brother Francesco (Frank) Martinolich. They settled shortly after in DeLisle, Mississippi, where Matteo worked for local shipbuilder Antonio Pavolini, originally from Italy. Matteo married Antonio's oldest daughter, Johanna, in 1885.

From 1907 to 1911, Martinolich also worked with the U.S. Army Corps of Engineers on the Chattahoochee River in Alabama. There he built dredge boats for their dam building projects.

Through World War I and until his semi-retirement and closing of the business in about 1922, Martinolich built and designed hundreds of ships and boats; some still ply the seas today.
