= Edward Price Bell =

American journalist

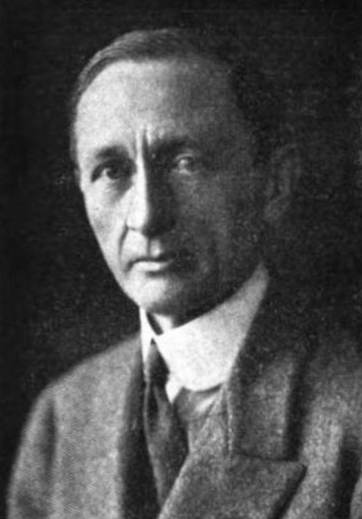
- Born: March 1, 1869; Parke County, Indiana
- Died: September 23, 1943 (aged 74); Pass Christian, Mississippi
- Burial place: Evergreen Cemetery, Gulfport
- Education: Wabash College
- Occupation: Journalist
- Spouse: May Alice Mills (m. 1897)

Edward Price Bell (March 1, 1869 – September 23, 1943) was a Chicago journalist, best known for his work with the Chicago Daily News.

== Biography ==
Bell was born in Parke County, Indiana, on March 1, 1869. He began his career as a newsman at the Terre Haute Evening Gazette at the age of 13. After attending Wabash College, he married May Alice Mills in 1897, and moved to Chicago in 1898, where he wrote for the Chicago Record Herald. Shortly thereafter, he was transferred to London as a foreign correspondent for the Record, and then the Chicago Daily News, where he served for 20 years. In December 1917, Editor & Publisher praised his coverage of events in Europe relating to the United States' entry into World War I.

Both before and since America's entry into the conflict Mr. Bell, with his pen and on the platform, has rendered services in the interests of his country and of the Allies that have caused him to be considered generally in the light of unofficial interpreter of American aims, institutions, and aspirations.

Bell covered U.S. President Herbert Hoover's good will tour through Latin America, and developed a strong friendship with Hoover. He used this close relationship to the advantage of British-American relations by organizing the London Naval Conference and Treaty, attended and signed by President Hoover and UK Prime Minister Ramsay MacDonald in 1930. Bell was nominated for a Nobel Peace Prize due to his role in this conference.

Bell died on September 23, 1943, at his home in Pass Christian, Mississippi, of complications of beriberi. He was buried at Evergreen Cemetery in Gulfport.
