= Pass Christian School District =

School district in Mississippi

Pass Christian Public School District

Address
- 6457 Kiln DeLisle Rd Pass Christian, Mississippi, 39571; United States
- Coordinates: 30°22′43″N 89°16′19″W

District information
- Type: Public
- Grades: Pre-K–12
- Superintendent: Carla J. Evers
- Accreditation: Cognia (Note: Cognia was previously known as AdvancED.) through the Southern Association of Colleges and Schools
- Schools: 1 high school (9–12); 1 middle school (6–8); 2 elementary schools (Pre-K–5); 1 early childhood center (8 weeks–4 years)
- NCES District ID: 2803510
- District ID: MS-2423

Students and staff
- Students: 2,053 (2018–19)
- Teachers: 133.33 (FTE) (2018–19)
- Student–teacher ratio: 15.4:1 (2018–19)
- Athletic conference: MHSAA District 8
- District mascot: Pirates
- Colors: Scarlet red; Royal blue; White

Other information
- Website: www.pc.k12.ms.us

The Pass Christian Public School District is a public school district based in Pass Christian, Mississippi (U.S.). The superintendent of the district is Carla J. Evers.

== Schools ==
Schools (2018–19)
School	Grades	Students	Teaching staff (FTE)	Student-to-teacher Ratio	Ref.
Pass Christian High School	9–12	619	41.54	14.9:1	
Pass Christian Middle School	6–8	538	35.48	15.16:1	
Pass Christian Elementary School	Pre-K–5	453	28.53	15.88:1	
DeLisle Elementary School	Pre-K–5	443	26.31	16.84:1	

== Impact of Hurricane Katrina ==
The August 29, 2005 landfall of Hurricane Katrina a few miles west of Pass Christian severely impacted the district. Pass Christian Middle School was completely destroyed. Pass Christian Elementary School flooded and grew mold over a few months and was not salvageable. The high school and administration building were severely damaged, and Delisle Elementary School, inland, was lightly damaged. On October 17, 2005, the schools reopened, with approximately 2/3s of the students, in temporary trailers at the Delisle site. The high school was reopened a little less than a year later in October of the 2006–2007 school year.

== Demographics ==
=== 2006–07 school year ===
There were a total of 1,489 students enrolled in the Pass Christian School District during the 2006–2007 school year. The gender makeup of the district was 51% female and 49% male. The racial makeup of the district was 29.75% African American, 64.47% White, 1.81% Hispanic, 3.83% Asian, and 0.13% Native American. 59.1% of the district's students were eligible to receive free lunch.

=== Previous school years ===
School Year	Enrollment	Gender Makeup		Racial Makeup				
School Year	Enrollment	Female	Male	Asian	African American	Hispanic	Native American	White
2005–06	1,343	51%	49%	2.16%	29.11%	1.79%	0.07%	66.87%
2004–05	1,980	50%	50%	3.08%	34.85%	1.82%	0.10%	60.15%
2003–04	1,954	50%	50%	3.07%	36.18%	1.94%	0.10%	58.70%
2002–03	1,924	50%	50%	3.01%	36.43%	0.83%	0.05%	59.67%

== Accountability statistics ==
	2006–07	2005–06	2004–05	2003–04	2002–03
District Accreditation Status	Accredited	Accredited	Accredited	Accredited	Accredited
School Performance Classifications
Level 5 (Superior Performing) Schools	3	3	3	4	4
Level 4 (Exemplary) Schools	0	0	1	0	0
Level 3 (Successful) Schools	0	0	0	0	0
Level 2 (Under Performing) Schools	0	0	0	0	0
Level 1 (Low Performing) Schools	0	0	0	0	0
Not Assigned	1	1	0	0	0

== See also ==
- List of school districts in Mississippi
