= Juan Chastang =

American politician

Mobile County Commissioner, District 1
- In office 2005–2007
- Preceded by: Sam Jones
- Succeeded by: Merceria Ludgood

Mobile County Commissioner, District 1
- In office 2008
- Preceded by: Merceria Ludgood
- Succeeded by: Merceria Ludgood

Personal details
- Born: 1961 or 1962 (age 63–64)
- Party: Republican

Juan H. Chastang (born 1961 or 1962) is an American politician in Mobile County, Alabama. He is notable for being the subject in the case of Riley vs. Kennedy, a case concerning Alabama election and appointment law which was taken on and ruled upon by the United States Supreme Court.

== Appointment to office ==
In 2005, longtime County Commissioner Sam Jones was elected as Mayor of Mobile. This left a vacancy in the first district seat on the County Commission. Governor Bob Riley appointed Chastang, an African-American Republican, to serve out the remainder to the term in the heavily African-American and Democratic district. This was not the first time that Riley had appointed someone to local office in Mobile County. In 2004, Riley appointed Stephen Nodine to the 2nd District seat on the County Commission after he won the 2004 Republican runoff to succeed former commissioner Freeman Jockisch, who had been convicted on federal corruption chargers earlier that year. In 2006, Riley appointed Sam Cochran as Sheriff of Mobile County after he had won the Republican primary. The office had become vacant that year upon the conviction of former Sheriff Jack Tillman on charges of embezzlement. Chastang's appointment to the commission marked the first time since Reconstruction that Mobile had an elected governmental board in Mobile County was unanimously Republican, and the first time since Reconstruction in which a black Republican was holding elected office in Mobile County.

== County Commissioner ==
The appointment of Chastang was greeted with criticism by the Mobile County Democratic Party and by the black political leadership of the city. Three black legislators who represented District 1 in the Alabama House of Representatives, Yvonne Kennedy, James Buskey and William Clark, proceeded to file suit alleging that the appointment of Chastang was a violation of a 1987 statute that allowed for special elections to fill vacancies in Mobile County offices. The crux of their case was that the governor did not have the right to appoint Chastang and as such his appointment was invalid.

In 2007, Chastang came under criticism for using $50,000 of his personal discretionary fund (public money) to pay for a concert that was to be headlined by Ciara. The concert controversy came while Riley v. Kennedy was being adjudicated in district court. On May 1, 2007, a federal district court ruled in favor of Kennedy, Buskey and Clark and vacated the appointment of Chastang.A special election proceeded in which Democrat Merceria Ludgood, a political ally of Mayor Jones, defeated Chastang by a lopsided margin to fill the vacancy.

In May 2008, the decision of the federal court by the U.S. Supreme Court, which summarily ruled in favor of Riley. An order was later issued to return Chastang to the commission. The ruling came after the eligibility period for the 2008 election, meaning that, if Chastang got on the ballot, he couldn't be re-elected. Chastang returned to the commission where he served several months, before resigning in September 2008. In the November 2008 elections, Ludgood was returned to the commission seat.
