= Pass Christian, Mississippi =

City in Mississippi, US

- City
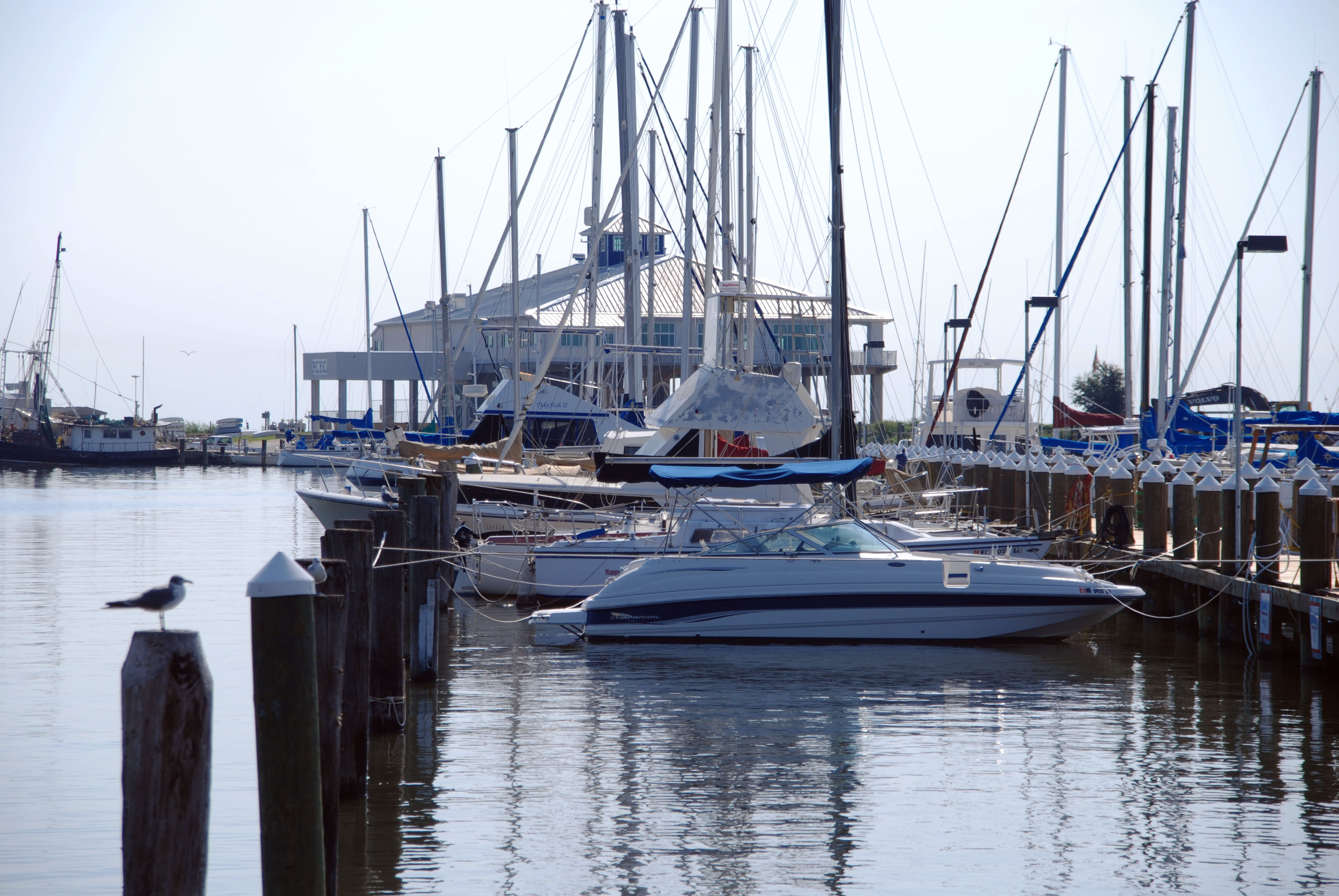
- Pass Christian Harbor

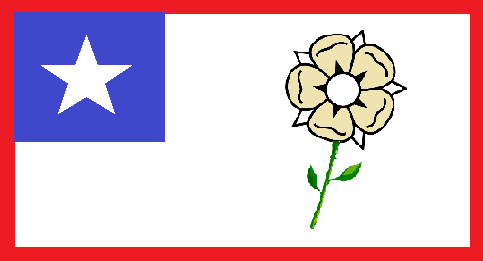
- Flag
- Nickname: The Pass
- Location within Harrison County and Mississippi

- Location within the contiguous United States
- Coordinates: 30°19′28″N 89°14′50″W
- Country: United States
- State: Mississippi
- County: Harrison
- Chartered (town): 1848

Government
  - Type: Mayor-Council
  - Mayor: Kenny Torgeson (R)
  - Board of Aldermen: Members: Barry Dreyfus; Joseph Piernas; Kirk Kimball; Gregory Federico; Victor M. Pickich

Area
  - Total: 15.26 sq mi (39.53 km^{2})
  - Land: 8.24 sq mi (21.33 km^{2})
  - Water: 7.03 sq mi (18.20 km^{2})
- Elevation: 13 ft (4 m)

Population (2020)
  - Total: 5,686
  - Density: 690.4/sq mi (266.57/km^{2})
- Time zone: UTC−6 (Central (CST))
  - Summer (DST): UTC−5 (CDT)
- ZIP code: 39571
- Area code: 228
- FIPS code: 28-55400
- GNIS feature ID: 0675482
- Website: Official website

Pass Christian (/ˌpæs krɪstʃiˈæn/), nicknamed The Pass, is a city in Harrison County, Mississippi, United States. It is part of the Gulfport-Biloxi metropolitan area. As of the 2020 census, Pass Christian had a population of 5,686.

== History ==
=== Pre-European history ===
The exact date when Native Americans first arrived in the Gulf Coast area is not known, but artifacts have been found suggesting that humans have inhabited the area for many thousands of years.

Indian mounds can be found throughout the Gulf coast region of southern Mississippi, but many have been destroyed by artifact hunters, farmers, developers, and flooding. A 1768 English map shows one large mound existed on the shore near to Market Street. Others existed at Bayou Portage and the Shelly Plantation on the shore north of the Bay of St. Louis near DeLisle. The mounds and middens in the area containing arrowheads, pottery, and human skeletons were pilfered by amateur archaeologists over the years and many of the items recovered are in private collections. At the border of Pass Christian and Long Beach near where White Harbor Road meets U.S. Route 90 there once existed an Indian village, whose inhabitants were referred to by locals as "The Pitcher Point Indians". The approximate location of the Indian Village is just a few hundred yards east of White Harbor Road. There are no ruins at this location but the beach in this area has produced many arrowheads and pottery sherds over the years.

=== French explorers ===
Pass Christian was discovered by French-Canadian explorers in 1699, shortly after the first French colony was established in Biloxi. In June 1699, while sounding the channel at the Pass Christian peninsula, the French named that channel Passe aux Huîtres for the many oysters they found there. Pass Christian was named for a nearby deepwater pass, which in turn was named for Nicholas Christian L'Adnier, who lived on nearby Cat Island beginning in 1746.

=== The Widow Asmard ===
In 1781 all of Pass Christian peninsula was owned by Julia de la Brosse (Widow Asmard). Upon her death in 1799, Widow Asmard deeded 800 arpents – the entire downtown Pass Christian – to Charles Asmar, a free person of color, who upon his death left the property to his heirs. Pass Christian was officially chartered as a town in 1848.

=== Antebellum Period ===
The town was a famous resort prior to the American Civil War. It was a favorite location for the beach and summer homes of the wealthy of New Orleans, who built a row of historic mansions along the shoreline, where Scenic Drive was one of the country's notable historic districts. The Southern Yacht Club, established in 1849, was the first yacht club in the South and the second in the United States, and was originally located in Pass Christian before moving to New Orleans in 1857. The first sailing regatta on the Gulf Coast was sailed in the Mississippi Sound on July 21, 1849, and organized by the Pass Christian Regatta Club with twelve boats participating.

=== Hurricanes and disaster management ===
==== Hurricane Camille ====
Pass Christian was in the path of two of the most intense hurricanes ever to hit the United States—Hurricane Camille on August 17, 1969, and Hurricane Katrina on August 29, 2005. Each hurricane caused the near total destruction of the city.

Hurricane Camille destroyed the Richelieu Apartments killing eight people who had chosen to ride the storm out. Early Sunday, August 17, the storm was southeast of New Orleans by 200 miles. A Hurricane Warning was then announced for the entire Mississippi Coast. Evacuation was advised but some of the occupants of the Richelieu apartments allegedly ignored the warning. The fictional hurricane party depicted in Hurricane, a 74-minute TV movie featuring some notable stars, includes original footage of Camille.

==== Hurricane Katrina ====
On August 29, 2005, Pass Christian was almost completely destroyed by Hurricane Katrina. Of the approximately 8,000 homes in Pass Christian, all but 500 were damaged or destroyed. In spite of the fact that the beachfront Scenic Drive follows the crest of a small bluff, affording it some elevation, most of the historic mansions along the road were severely damaged, and many were completely destroyed, including the superbly restored Greek Revival mansion "Union Quarters" described in the National Register of Historic Places as having been built in 1855. A cast-iron fence fronted the property, enclosing a Magnolia Historical Marker which was dedicated in 1960. It read, "Union officers were temporarily quartered here during the invasion of Pass Christian."

Hurricane Katrina totally destroyed the local public library. It was rebuilt. Thirteen members of the city's police department retreated to the library after the police station became unsafe and water from the Gulf of Mexico began to pour in.

The library was immediately north of City Hall across a small parking lot but was at a lower elevation. When the water crested the elevation of City Hall, the police cars in the parking lot began to float and were carried around the parking lot by the current. One car struck the south side doors, causing them to implode, and the Gulf of Mexico driven by Katrina's powerful winds rushed into the building. With no way to fight against the current they were trapped inside a concrete box that was rapidly filling with water. Knowing that they had to escape they attempted to shoot the glass out of the north side of the building. This was unsuccessful, as the bullets ricocheted off the glass. The laminated glass proved impervious to the .45 caliber rounds of the police-issue handguns. The force of the water entering the building after the southern wall was destroyed by the car was far too strong to swim against. The only way out was with the current. Police Chief John Dubbisson swam to the rear doors that had to be opened where he successfully touched the push bar. He then grabbed a railing before the storm surge could carry him off. All that were inside the library made it outside and rode out the rest of the storm on the roof.

The storm surge from Hurricane Katrina that hit Pass Christian was estimated at 8.5 m (27.8 ft), which is the US record high, leveling Pass Christian up to half a mile inland from the shore; estimation of highest storm surges was complicated because high-water markers were also destroyed. Highway 90 along the beach was damaged, and the bridge over the Bay of St. Louis was thrown completely apart, not being reopened until a new bridge was partially completed in May 2007. (Connection was temporarily replaced by a ferry service.) Sewage contamination rendered the local water supply unusable, as some samples tested positive for more than 250 bacteria and parasites. By late September 2005, access was restricted south of the railroad tracks (about four blocks inland) without proper credentials, as crews continued to search for victims and clear debris. By early 2007, although rebuilding was underway in much of the city, a large portion of empty, deserted homes and other structures remain. Many residents were still living in FEMA trailers, and out-of-state volunteers were still needed for the rebuilding effort.

== Geography ==
According to the United States Census Bureau, the city has a total area of 15.3 square miles (40 km^{2}), of which 8.4 square miles (22 km^{2}) is land and 6.9 square miles (18 km^{2}) (44.97%) is water.

Geographically, the town of Pass Christian located on the Mississippi Sound, and is situated on a peninsula, with water on three sides: the Gulf of Mexico to the south, the Bay of St. Louis to the west and a long stretch of bayou to the north.

The unincorporated area north of the bayou, known as DeLisle, shares a zip code with Pass Christian, but is not within the city limits. DeLisle was formerly known as Wolf Town or Wolftown.

=== Pass Christian Harbor ===
The Municipal Harbor was formalized in 1956 with the creation of a Harbor Commission. In 1958, an 11-foot high, 350-foot long, concrete, breakwater wall was constructed in the sound by the T. L. James Company.

== Demographics ==
Historical population
Census	Pop.	Note	%±
1850	790		—
1870	1,951		—
1880	1,410		−27.7%
1890	1,705		20.9%
1900	2,028		18.9%
1910	2,458		21.2%
1920	2,357		−4.1%
1930	3,004		27.5%
1940	3,338		11.1%
1950	3,383		1.3%
1960	3,881		14.7%
1970	2,979		−23.2%
1980	5,014		68.3%
1990	5,557		10.8%
2000	6,579		18.4%
2010	4,613		−29.9%
2020	5,686		23.3%
U.S. Decennial Census

=== 2020 census ===
As of the 2020 census, there were 5,686 people, 2,163 households, and 1,574 families residing in the city. The median age was 43.9 years. 22.7% of residents were under the age of 18 and 22.8% were 65 years of age or older. For every 100 females there were 91.7 males, and for every 100 females age 18 and over there were 87.1 males age 18 and over.

95.3% of residents lived in urban areas, while 4.7% lived in rural areas.

Of households in the city, 31.3% had children under the age of 18 living in them. 45.0% were married-couple households, 16.7% were households with a male householder and no spouse or partner present, and 32.1% were households with a female householder and no spouse or partner present. About 27.2% of all households were made up of individuals, and 13.0% had someone living alone who was 65 years of age or older.

There were 2,865 housing units, of which 20.7% were vacant. The homeowner vacancy rate was 3.0% and the rental vacancy rate was 11.9%.

Pass Christian racial composition as of 2020
Race	Num.	Perc.
White (non-Hispanic)	3,520	61.91%
Black or African American (non-Hispanic)	1,420	24.97%
Native American	20	0.35%
Asian	175	3.08%
Pacific Islander	6	0.11%
Other/Mixed	297	5.22%
Hispanic or Latino	248	4.36%

== Economy ==
=== Manufacturing ===
The Du Pont White Pigment and Mineral Products Plant – now known as the Chemours DeLisle Plant – is located just south of I-10 in DeLisle. The plant is the 2nd largest producer of titanium dioxide in the world and has been in operation since 1979. The town of Pass Christian is near the plant, directly across the Bay of St. Louis. Some community members also expressed concerns that chemical releases, as reported on EPA's Toxic Release Inventory, from the DuPont plant could have contaminated the community's water and air. DuPont DeLisle's titanium dioxide plant reported the third highest amount of dioxin-like compounds in EPA's Toxic Release Inventory (TRI). In 2005, the Hurricane Katrina storm surge flooded significant portions of the plant. Unlike other aquatic organisms, blue crabs do not have the ability to metabolize quickly certain dioxin-like compounds Polychlorinated dibenzofurans that predominate in the coke and ore solids waste stream of the plant.

=== Seafood processing ===
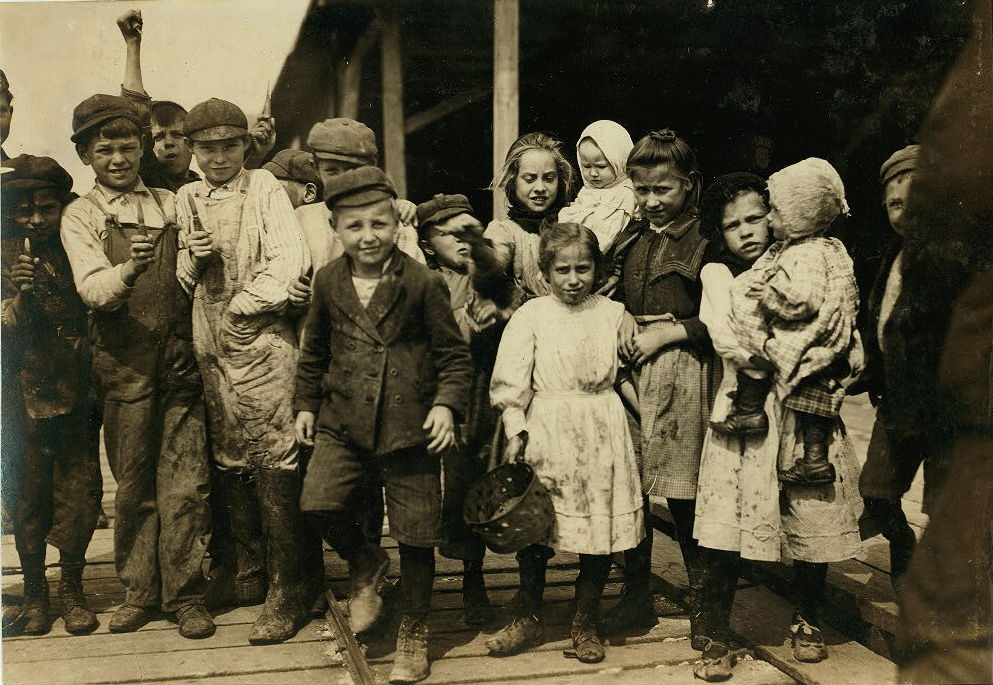
Children employed as oyster shuckers at Pass Packing Company, 1911. Photo by Lewis Hine.

Seafood production in the region has been severely impacted by large scale fish die-offs. The Deepwater Horizon oil spill, which occurred in the spring and summer of 2010—along with the presence of toxic sediments stirred up by Hurricane Katrina and record amounts of fresh water diverted into the Bonnet Carre Spillway in Louisiana—have brought seafood production to a standstill. Offshore oyster beds were hit especially hard. Field crews have reported a 50 percent to 65 percent mortality rate in some areas. An even greater mortality rate of 90 percent to 95 percent has been seen in other oyster beds. According to research from The Nature Conservancy, "roughly 13 years ago, Mississippi was harvesting nearly 500,000 sacks of oysters annually ....".

== Tourism ==
=== Middlegate Japanese Gardens ===
Between 1923 and 1929, New Orleans residents Rudolf Hecht and Lynne Watkins Hecht developed Middlegate Japanese Gardens at their summer home in Pass Christian, Mississippi. The Hechts built Middlegate Japanese gardens to perpetuate their pleasant memories of their travels in Japan. The gardens are listed on the National Register of Historic Places. Since 1923 when the Hechts established them, Middlegate Japanese Gardens have been private, residential gardens. The gardens were extensively damaged by Hurricane Katrina in 2005. The Smithsonian Institution has included the gardens on their Collection Search Center website.

=== Sherman Castle ===
James M. Sherman began construction of Sherman Castle in 1921. The building is constructed of concrete blocks and steel and contained a plaque which read "God is my Sculptor".

=== Dixie White House ===
Woodrow Wilson stayed a winter at Beaulieu when it was owned by John M. Ayer of New Jersey and leased by Herndons family. Built 1854 for John Bachelor and demolished after suffering from heavy damage from Hurricane Camille in 1969.

== Government and Infrastructure ==
=== Municipal government ===
Pass Christian's government is a mayor–council government system. The current mayor is Kenny Torgeson.

Board of Aldermen (2023)

- Ward I: Barry Dreyfus
- Ward II: Joseph Piernas
- Ward III: Kirk Kimball
- Ward IV: Gregory Federico
- Alderman-at-Large: Victor Pickich

=== Naval Construction Battalion Center ===
Naval Construction Battalion Center Gulfport, Mississippi, launched Seabees on Sept. 9 to neighboring communities throughout Harrison and Stone counties, including Pass Christian, to assist its citizens with disaster recovery in the wake of Hurricane Katrina. In a measure to improve health, sanitation and morale, the Seabees cleared approximately three miles of railroad track for a temporary sewer line, they set up a laundry unit and installed a nine-head shower unit for the firefighters and volunteers. They also built temporary housing to house 1,000 people rendered homeless by the impact of Hurricane Katrina. 250 Seabees from detachments across the United States gathered behind the city's War Memorial Park, where they constructed a temporary police department headquarters and other municipal offices. This was not the first time that Seabees have answered the call to duty in Pass Christian. The naval construction teams performed a similar feat after Hurricane Camille struck the town hard in 1969.

== Education ==
The Pass Christian School District operates the schools in the city, and in the inland, unincorporated areas around and to the north of DeLisle. The district operates one early childhood/pre-K facility (University of Southern Mississippi Child Development Center), two elementary schools (DeLisle Elementary & Pass Christian Elementary), one middle school (Pass Christian Middle School) and one high school (Pass Christian High School).

Pass Christian High School was recognized as a National Blue Ribbon School in 2005; Pass Christian Middle School in 2012; and DeLisle Elementary in 2013.

The parochial elementary and middle school of St. Paul's Roman Catholic church was destroyed by Katrina, and the school was merged with the neighboring Long Beach parochial school to form St. Vincent de Paul School. Coast Episcopal High School is a parochial high school in Pass Christian.

== Notable people ==
- Bidwell Adam, Lieutenant Governor of Mississippi (1928–1932)
- Bryan Austin, country music artist
- Phelan Beale, original owner of Grey Gardens
- Clyde F. Bel, Jr., businessman from New Orleans and state representative for Orleans Parish, 1964–1972 and 1975–1980; spent much of his later life in Pass Christian
- Edward Price Bell, Chicago journalist
- Carolyn Crawford, member of the Mississippi House of Representatives
- Scottie Cuevas, former member of the Mississippi State Senate
- Deborah Jeanne Dawkins, former member of the Mississippi State Senate
- Walter Gordon, veteran of World War II Easy Company, as portrayed in the miniseries Band of Brothers
- Lawrence Guyot, civil rights activist
- Captain John Handy, jazz musician
- John Henderson, member of the U.S. Senate from 1839 to 1845
- Doyle Overton Hickey, office in the United States Army who retired to Pass Christian
- Jimmy Johnson, cartoonist and creator of the syndicated newspaper comic strip Arlo and Janis
- Jeanette Kimball, jazz pianist
- Gene Lang (American football), former NFL runningback
- Margaret Loesch, television executive and producer, formerly founding CEO of Fox Kids Networks and the US Hallmark Channel, currently CEO of The Hub, a TV network
- Cory McGee, professional middle distance runner, 2020 Olympian
- Tig Notaro, stand-up comic, born in Jackson, Mississippi but raised in Pass Christian until kindergarten
- Oliver Randolph, African American lawyer and politician
- Robin Roberts, ABC News' Good Morning America anchor
- Jesmyn Ward, novelist, winner of the 2011 National Book Award for Fiction; born in DeLisle
- Larry Yarborough, member of the North Carolina House of Representatives

== See also ==
- J.W. Randolph School (Pass Christian, Mississippi)
