= Manda Collins =

American novelist

- Occupation: Author
- Writing career
- Genre: Regency romance

Manda Collins is an author of romance novels. Most of her books are regency romances, but she has also written a contemporary romance novels novella, Legally Yours.

Her Wicked Widows series are Regency romance novels with an element of mystery, about women with unhappy first marriages who fall in love with better men after their first husbands have died.

Collins' first book, How to Dance with a Duke, was nominated for an RT Book Reviews Reviewers' Choice Award for First Historical Romance.

Her novella The Perks of Being a Beauty was the winner of the 2014 Gayle Wilson Award of Excellence for Best Novella.

The second book in Collins' Studies in Scandal series, Duke with Benefits, was named a Kirkus Best Romance of 2017.

== Books ==
=== Ugly Ducklings ===
1. How to Dance with a Duke, St. Martin's Press, 2012
2. How to Romance a Rake, St. Martin's Press, 2012
3. How to Entice an Earl, St. Martin's Press, 2013
- The Perks of Being a Beauty (novella), St. Martin's Press, 2013

=== Wicked Widows ===
1. Why Dukes Say I Do, St. Martin's Press, 2013
2. Why Earls Fall in Love, St. Martin's Press, 2014
3. Why Lords Lose Their Hearts, St. Martin's Press, 2014
- Once Upon a Christmas Kiss (novella), St. Martin's Press, 2014

=== The Lords of Anarchy ===
1. A Good Rake Is Hard to Find, St. Martin's Press, 2015
2. Good Earl Gone Bad, St. Martin's Press, 2015
3. Good Dukes Wear Black, St. Martin's Press, 2016
- With This Christmas Ring, St. Martin's Press, 2017

=== Studies in Scandal ===
1. Ready Set Rogue, St. Martin's Press, 2017
2. Duke with Benefits, St. Martin's Press, 2017
3. Wallflower Most Wanted, St. Martin's Press, 2018
4. One for the Rogue, St. Martin's Press, 2018

=== Ladies Guide Series ===
1. A Lady's Guide to Mischief and Mayhem, Forever, 2020
2. An Heiress's Guide to Deception and Desire, Forever, 2021
3. A Spinster's Guide to Danger and Dukes, Forever, 2023
4. A Governess's Guide to Passion and Peril, Forever, 2024

=== Other works ===
- Legally Yours, self-published, 2012
