= Alabama's 33rd Senate district =

Alabama's 33rd State Senate district
Senator
Vivian Davis Figures; D–Mobile
- Demographics: 30.0% White; 64.5% Black; 2.3% Hispanic; 0.6% Asian
- Population (2022): 138,713

Alabama's 33rd Senate district is one of 35 districts in the Alabama Senate. The district has been represented by Vivian Davis Figures since a special election in 1997.

== Geography ==
Election	Map	Counties in District
2026; 2022		Portions of Baldwin, Mobile
2018		Portion of Mobile
2014		Portion of Mobile
2010; 2006; 2002		Portion of Mobile

== Election history ==
=== Elections in the 2020s ===
Alabama Senate election, 2022: Senate District 33
Party	Candidate	Votes	%	±%
Democratic	Vivian Davis Figures (Incumbent)	23,203	66.95	−31.66
Republican	Pete Riehm	11,401	32.90	+32.90
Write-in		51	0.15	-1.24
Majority		11,802	34.06	−63.15
Turnout		34,655		
Democratic hold				

=== Elections in the 2010s ===
Alabama Senate election, 2018: Senate District 33
Party	Candidate	Votes	%	±%
Democratic	Vivian Davis Figures (Incumbent)	34,995	98.61	−0.27
Write-in		495	1.39	+0.27
Majority		34,500	97.21	−0.55
Turnout		35,490		
Democratic hold				

Alabama Senate election, 2014: Senate District 33
Party	Candidate	Votes	%	±%
Democratic	Vivian Davis Figures (Incumbent)	23,012	98.88	+25.55
Write-in		261	1.12	+1.02
Majority		22,751	97.76	+50.99
Turnout		23,273		
Democratic hold				

Alabama Senate election, 2010: Senate District 33
Party	Candidate	Votes	%	±%
Democratic	Vivian Davis Figures (Incumbent)	23,241	73.33	+1.92
Republican	Brad Moser	8,419	26.57	−1.93
Write-in		32	0.10	+0.01
Majority		14,822	46.77	+3.86
Turnout		31,692		
Democratic hold				

=== Elections in the 2000s ===
Alabama Senate election, 2006: Senate District 33
Party	Candidate	Votes	%	±%
Democratic	Vivian Davis Figures (Incumbent)	19,029	71.41	−28.39
Republican	Jeffery Jones	7,594	28.50	+28.50
Write-in		25	0.09	-0.11
Majority		11,435	42.91	−56.69
Turnout		26,648		
Democratic hold				

Alabama Senate election, 2002: Senate District 33
Party	Candidate	Votes	%	±%
Democratic	Vivian Davis Figures (Incumbent)	23,433	99.80	−0.10
Write-in		47	0.20	+0.10
Majority		23,386	99.60	−0.20
Turnout		23,480		
Democratic hold				

=== Elections in the 1990s ===
Alabama Senate election, 1998: Senate District 33
Party	Candidate	Votes	%	±%
Democratic	Vivian Davis Figures (Incumbent)	20,682	99.90	+12.73
Write-in		21	0.10	+0.05
Majority		20,661	99.80	+25.41
Turnout		20,703		
Democratic hold				

Alabama Senate District 33 special election - 28 January 1997
Party	Candidate	Votes	%	±%
Democratic	Vivian Davis Figures	7,928	87.17	−12.53
Republican	Gregory Ramos	1,162	12.78	+12.78
Write-in		5	0.05	-0.25
Majority		6,766	74.39	−25.00
Turnout		9,095		
Democratic hold				

Alabama Senate election, 1994: Senate District 33
Party	Candidate	Votes	%	±%
Democratic	Michael Figures (Incumbent)	16,356	99.70	+25.86
Write-in		50	0.30	+0.30
Majority		16,306	99.39	+51.70
Turnout		16,406		
Democratic hold				

Alabama Senate election, 1990: Senate District 33
Party	Candidate	Votes	%	±%
Democratic	Michael Figures (Incumbent)	16,220	73.84	−26.16
Republican	Michael Bridges	5,744	26.15	+26.15
Write-in		1	0.00	+0.00
Majority		10,476	47.69	
Turnout		21,965		
Democratic hold				

=== Elections in the 1980s ===
Alabama Senate election, 1986: Senate District 33
Party	Candidate	Votes	%	±%
Democratic	Michael Figures (Incumbent)	18,808	100.00	
Majority		18,808	100.00	
Turnout		18,808		
Democratic hold				

Alabama Senate election, 1983: Senate District 33
Party	Candidate	Votes	%	±%
Democratic	Michael Figures (Incumbent)	4,620	100.00	
Majority		4,620	100.00	
Turnout		4,620		
Democratic hold				

Alabama Senate election, 1982: Senate District 33
Party	Candidate	Votes	%	±%
Democratic	Michael Figures (Incumbent)	15,247	100.00	
Majority		15,247	100.00	
Turnout		15,247		
Democratic hold				

== District officeholders ==
Senators take office at midnight on the day of their election.

- Vivian Davis Figures (1997–present)
- Michael Figures (1978–1996)
- Mike Perloff (1974–1978)

Not in use 1966–1974.

- John M. Tyson (1962–1966)
- Will E. Caffey Jr. (1958–1962)
- Garet Van Antwerp III (1954–1958)
