= J. W. Randolph School =

Historic building in Pass Christian, Mississippi, United States

J.W. Randolph School
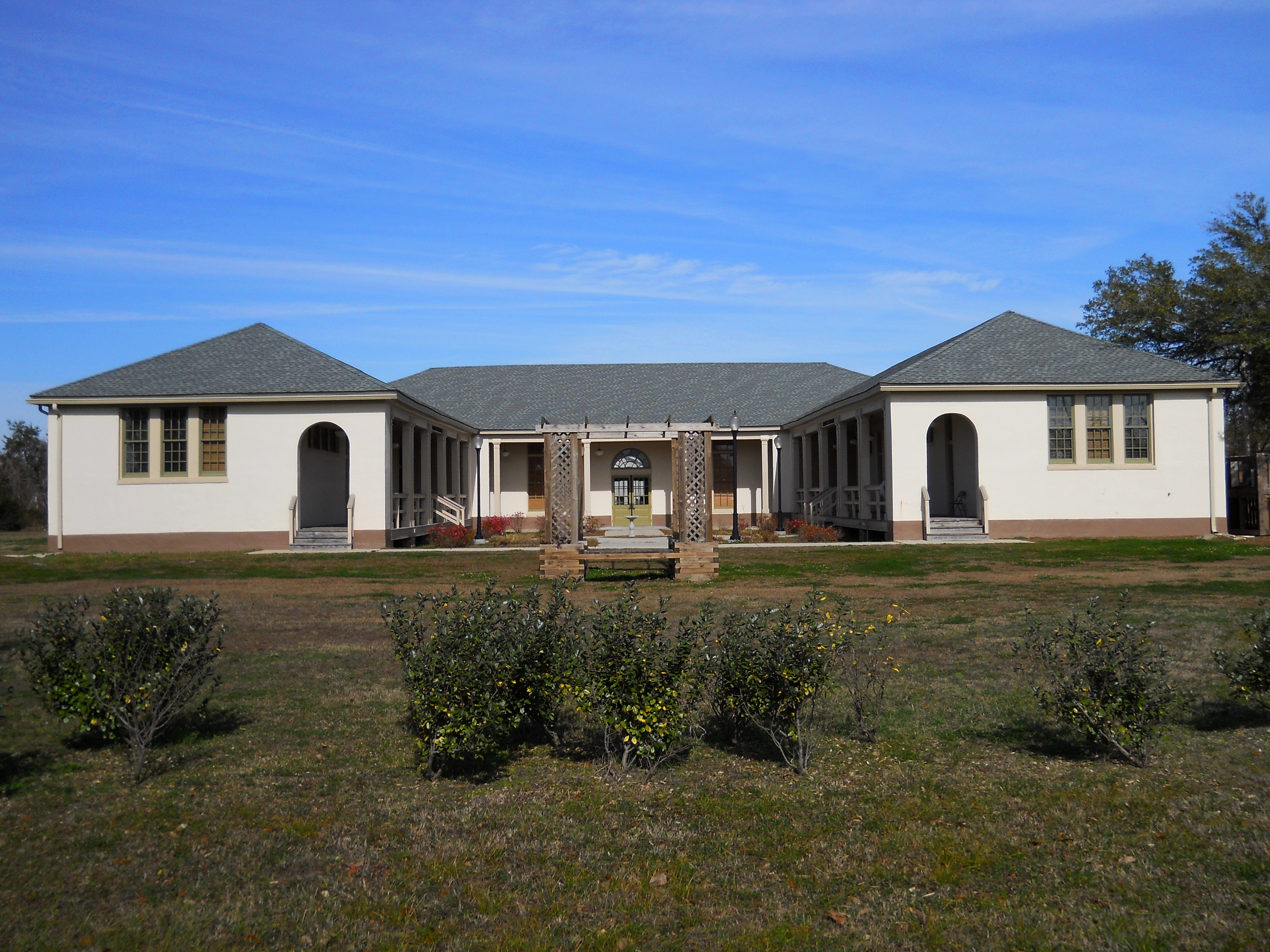
- J.W. Randolph School, January 2013

- Location within Mississippi
- 30.318611°N 89.250000°W
- Location: 315 Clark Avenue, Pass Christian, Mississippi

History
- Built: 1928

Site notes
- Governing body: Pass Christian, Mississippi

Mississippi Landmark
- Official name: Pass Christian Middle School (J.W. Randolph School [Rosenwald])
- Designated: October 12, 2006
- Reference no.: 047-PSC-0473.1-ML

U.S. National Register of Historic Places
- Designated: February 19, 2025
- Reference no.: 100010472

The J.W. Randolph School was constructed in 1928 as a public school for African-American students in Pass Christian, Mississippi. The building was vacated as a school in 2000. In 2006, the structure was designated a Mississippi Landmark, and in 2025 it was listed on the National Register of Historic Places.

== History ==
Around 1920, a Black civic organization petitioned for a new school to be built for African-American students in Pass Christian. In 1927-28, the school was constructed at a cost of $24,000. Construction financing was provided through public funding and private donations, including the Rosenwald Fund. Originally designated as the Harrison County Training School, the name was changed in 1939 to honor a former school principal, J.W. Randolph. When school segregation came to an end in 1966, the building was rededicated as the Pass Christian Middle School. After 2000, the building no longer served as a public school.

Between 2000 and 2005, the building complex was used as a Senior Citizen Center, Boys and Girls Club, and a branch office for Harrison County Human Services.

In August 2005, the structure was severely damaged by winds and storm surge from Hurricane Katrina. Although considered for demolition after the storm, the school was saved by a coalition of former students, community activists, and preservationists. Restoration efforts began in 2009 with funding from public and private grants. The renovated school was dedicated on January 22, 2013, to be used as a senior citizen center and for social events.
