= Lynching of Michael Donald =

1981 lynching in Mobile, Alabama, U.S.

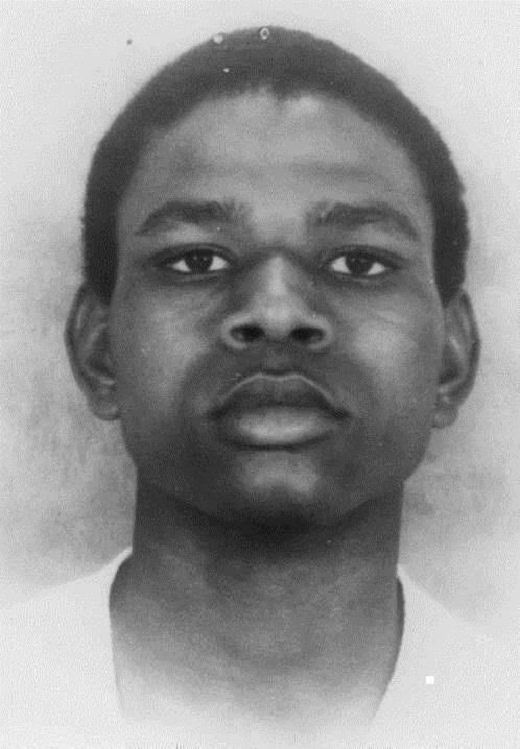
- Lynching victim Michael Donald
- Location: Mobile, Alabama
- Date: March 21, 1981
- Perpetrator: Ku Klux Klan
- Convictions: Henry Hays: Capital murder James Knowles: Civil rights violations Benjamin Cox: Murder
- Sentence: Hays: Death by electric chair Knowles: Life imprisonment (paroled); Cox: Life imprisonment (paroled)

Michael Donald was a 19-year-old African-American who was lynched by the Ku Klux Klan (KKK) in Mobile, Alabama, on March 21, 1981. He was one of the last reported lynching victims in the United States. Several KKK members beat and killed Donald. His body was hung from a tree. One perpetrator, Henry Hays, was executed by electric chair in 1997, while another, James Knowles, was sentenced to life in prison in 1985 after pleading guilty and testifying against Hays. Knowles was paroled after serving 25 years. Benjamin Cox was convicted as an accomplice and also sentenced to life in prison in 1989. Cox was paroled in 2000. A fourth was indicted but died before his trial could be completed.

Hays was the first white person to be executed in Alabama for a crime against a black person since 1913. It was the only execution of a Klan member during the 20th century for the murder of an African American person. Donald's mother, Beulah Mae Donald, brought a civil suit for wrongful death against the United Klans of America (UKA), to which the attackers belonged. In 1987, a jury awarded her damages of $7 million, which bankrupted the organization. This set a precedent for civil legal action for damages against other racist hate groups.

== Victim ==
Michael Anthony Donald (July 24, 1961 – March 21, 1981) was born in Mobile, Alabama, the son of Beulah Mae (Greggory) Donald and David Donald. He was the youngest of six children. He attended local schools while growing up. In 1981, he was studying at a technical college, while working at the local newspaper, the Mobile Press Register.

Donald grew up in a city and state influenced by the passage in the mid-1960s of federal civil rights legislation that ended legal segregation and provided for federal oversight and enforcement of voting rights. African Americans could again participate in politics in the South; their ability to register to vote also meant that they were selected for juries.

== Background ==
In 1981, Josephus Anderson, an African American charged with the murder of a white policeman in Birmingham, Alabama, during an armed robbery, was tried in Mobile, where the case had been moved in a change of venue. At a meeting held in Mobile while the jury was still deliberating, members of Unit 900 of the United Klans of America (UKA), Alabama Realm, complained that Anderson was not convicted since the jury had African-American members. Bennie Jack Hays, the second-highest-ranking official in the UKA, reportedly said: "If a black man can get away with killing a white man, we ought to be able to get away with killing a black man."

The first trial of Anderson ended with a deadlock of the mixed white-black jury. Anderson's case was retried, which resulted in a second mistrial declared on all four counts on Friday March 20, 1981. At 10 p.m., local media started to report the hung jury's second failure to reach a verdict. Following a meeting held together the same day, Henry Hays (aged 26) – Bennie Hays's son and the Exalted Cyclops of the UKA – along with James Llewellyn "Tiger" Knowles (aged 17), both drove around Mobile looking for a black person to attack, armed with a gun and equipped with a rope borrowed from Frank Cox, Hays's brother-in-law.

Anderson would ultimately have a third mistrial before being convicted of capital murder at his fourth trial, although the jury spared him from execution. Anderson was sentenced to life in prison without parole. He died in the Holman Correctional Facility – coincidentally, the same location where Henry Hays was executed – where he was still serving his sentence, in March 2021.

== Murder ==
While Hays and Knowles were cruising through one of Mobile's mostly black neighborhoods, they spotted Michael Donald walking home after he bought a pack of cigarettes for his sister, at the nearby gas station. Without any link to the Anderson case or even a past criminal record, Donald was chosen at random for being black. The two UKA members lured him over to their car by asking him for directions to a local club and forced Donald into the car at gunpoint. The men then drove out to another county and took him to a secluded area in the woods near Mobile Bay.

Donald attempted to escape, knocking away Hays's gun and trying to run into the woods. The men pursued Donald, attacked him and beat him with a tree limb. Hays wrapped a rope around Donald's neck and pulled on it to strangle him while Knowles continued to beat Donald with a tree branch. Once Donald had stopped moving, Hays slit his throat three times to make sure he was dead. The men left Donald's lifeless body hanging from a tree on Herndon Avenue across the street from Hays's house in Mobile, where it remained until the next morning. The same night, two other UKA members burned a cross on the Mobile County courthouse lawn to celebrate the murder.

== Investigation and criminal proceedings ==
=== Arrests ===
On March 25, 1981, officers first took three suspects into custody, Ralph Eugene Hayes and brothers named Jimmy and Johnny Edgar. A tipster named Johnny Ray Kelly claimed to have seen the men in the area that night. Kelly told police he'd seen what looked like blood on Hayes' clothes. Kelly claimed that he asked Hayes about it, and that the man responded that he'd "jumped a Black dude." The alleged motive was possible involvement in a drug deal went wrong. Donald's mother insisted that her son had not been involved in drugs. The police released the suspects at the conclusion of their investigation. Beulah Mae Donald contacted national civil rights activist Rev. Jesse Jackson, who organized a protest march in the city and demanded answers from the police.

On June 6, 1981, Ralph Hayes and the Edgar brothers were released from custody after it was determined that Kelly had committed perjury. On July 1, Kelly was convicted of perjury. On July 28, Kelly, who had four prior felony convictions, including one for attempted murder, was sentenced to life in prison as a habitual offender.

The FBI investigated the case and it was ready to close its investigation, but Thomas Figures, the Assistant U.S. Attorney in Mobile, asked the Dept. of Justice to authorize a second investigation. He worked closely with FBI agent James Bodman. His brother Michael Figures, a state senator and civil rights activist, served as an attorney to Beulah Mae Donald and also encouraged the investigation. Two and a half years later in 1983, Henry Hays and James Knowles were arrested. Knowles confessed to Bodman in 1983, and additional evidence was revealed during the civil trial initiated by Donald's mother Beulah Mae Donald in 1984, leading to the indictment of Benjamin Franklin Cox Jr., a truck driver, as an accomplice in the criminal case. Henry's father Bennie Hays was also indicted.

=== Convictions ===
==== Henry Hays ====
Henry Francis Hays (November 10, 1954 – June 6, 1997) was convicted of capital murder. The jury voted in favor of life imprisonment but the judge overruled the jury's verdict and sentenced Hays to death. He was incarcerated in the Holman Correctional Facility in Atmore, Alabama, while on death row.

Hays was executed in "Yellow Mama", Alabama's electric chair, on June 6, 1997. Among the witnesses to the execution was Michael Donald's brother, Stanley. The execution of Hays was Alabama's first for a white-on-black crime since 1913, when two white men were hanged for the murder of a black man. Hays is the only known Ku Klux Klan member to have been executed in the 20th century for the murder of an African American. Asked if wanted to make a final statement, Hays mouthed "I love you" to Stanley Donald and made a thumbs-up sign.

Hays publicly maintained his innocence to the end. At his funeral, however, Reverend Bob Smith, president of the Mobile chapter of the NAACP, revealed that a tearful Hays had privately made a 40-minute confession to Donald's murder to him two days before his execution. According to later reporting, Hays had renounced his racist views in prison. He befriended several black death row inmates. When Bennie Hays visited his son in prison, Hays introduced Anthony Ray Hinton and another black death row inmate to him as his friends. Bennie Hays refused to shake their hands or even speak with them and later angrily told his son, "Don't you ever let a nigger over to this table."

==== James Knowles ====
James Llewellyn "Tiger" Knowles was indicted by a federal grand jury in 1985 for violating the civil rights of Michael Donald, and pleaded guilty to civil rights violations in the United States District Court for the Southern District of Alabama. By the end of the trial, he was 21 years old. U.S. District Court Judge William Brevard Hand sentenced him to life in prison.

Knowles avoided a death sentence by testifying against Hays, Cox, and other Klansmen at the trial. He had earlier testified that the slaying was done "to show Klan strength in Alabama." Knowles served 25 years in prison before being paroled in 2006.

In 2008, Knowles, who now had a job and was in the Federal Witness Protection Program, had not changed his name. He had black friends, but was reluctant to tell them about his past.

==== Benjamin Cox ====
Benjamin Franklin Cox Jr., a truck driver from Mobile who provided the rope and a pistol, was initially discharged by a trial judge in 1984, citing Alabama's 3-year statute of limitations for criminal conspiracy. However, an Alabama grand jury reindicted Cox for murder in 1987. Initially resulting in a mistrial in 1988, a second trial held on May 18, 1989, led to Cox's conviction for being an accomplice in Donald's killing. Mobile County Circuit Court judge Michael Zoghby sentenced the then 28-year-old Cox to life in prison. He was paroled in 2000.

==== Bennie Hays ====
Henry Hays's father, Bennie Jack Hays, the former leader of the United Klans in southern Alabama, was indicted for inciting the murder. Tried some years later, his case ended in a mistrial when he collapsed in court. Judge Zoghby said that because of the illness of the elder Hays, then 71, he had no choice but to declare a mistrial. Hays's lawyer was willing to go forward with proceedings. Hays died of a heart attack before he could be retried.

== Civil proceedings ==
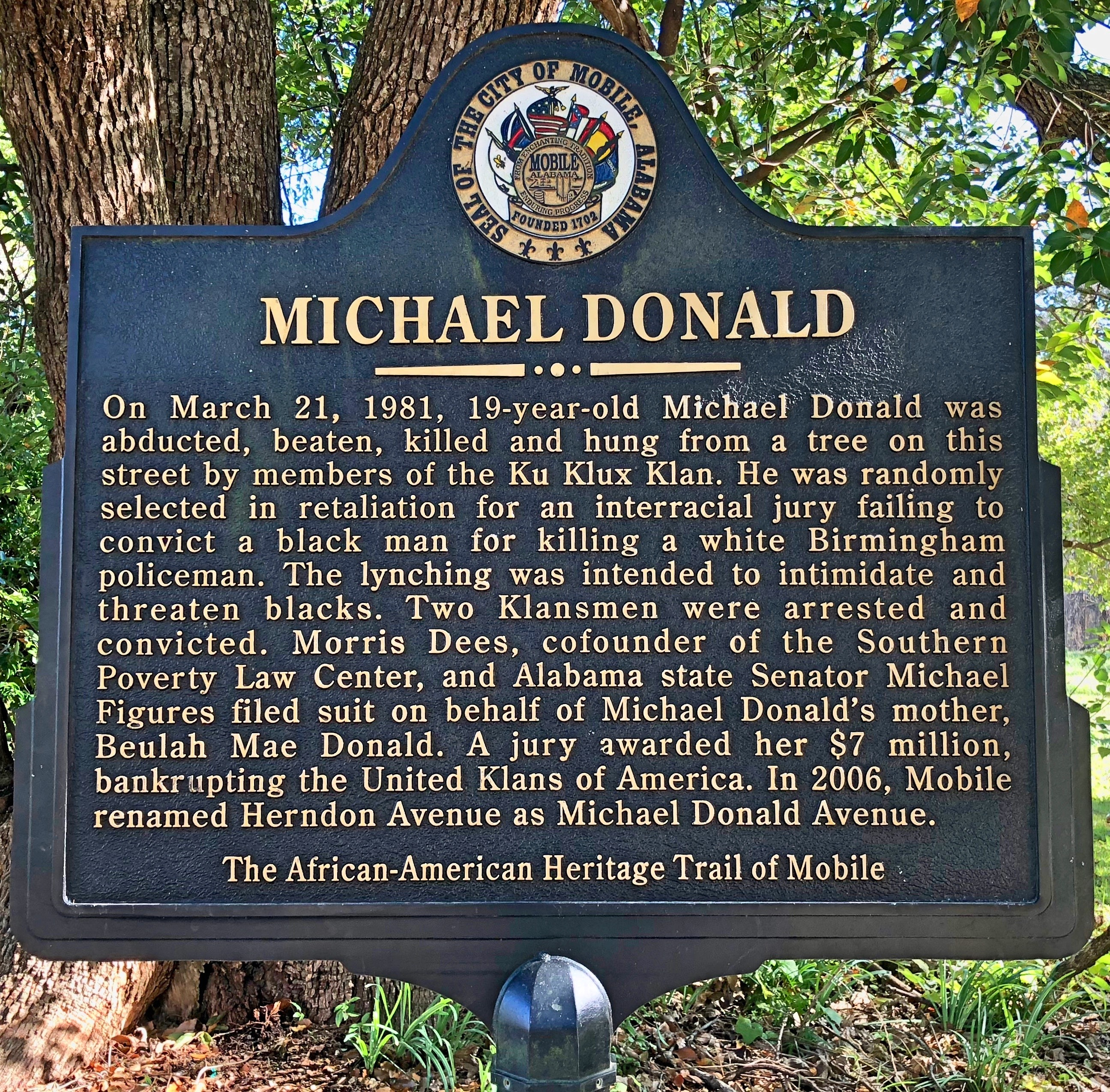
Memorial marker at the murder site by the African-American Heritage Trail of Mobile

Acting at the request of Beulah Mae Donald, Morris Dees, founder of the Southern Poverty Law Center in Montgomery, and Michael Figures brought a wrongful death suit in 1984 against the United Klans of America in federal court in the Southern District of Alabama, according to the SPLC. The civil trial brought out evidence that enabled the criminal indictment and conviction of Cox as an accomplice, and of Bennie Jack Hays for inciting the murder.

The original complaint was considered too vague to hold up, but Judge Alex T. Howard Jr. helped refine the legal theory of "agency," which held the Klan accountable for the acts of its members. This prevented the case from being dismissed before it could go to the jury. In 1987, an all-white jury had decided that rather than hold Knowles, the elder and younger Hayses liable, it found the entire UKA as a group to be at fault. The UKA was ordered to pay damages of $7 million in the wrongful death verdict in the case. The suit became a precedent for civil legal action against other racist hate groups in the United States.

Payment of the judgment bankrupted the United Klans of America. The group was forced to settle the suit by selling its two-story "national headquarters" building for $51,875, the proceeds going to Donald's mother. She died the following year on September 17, 1988.

== Commemoration ==
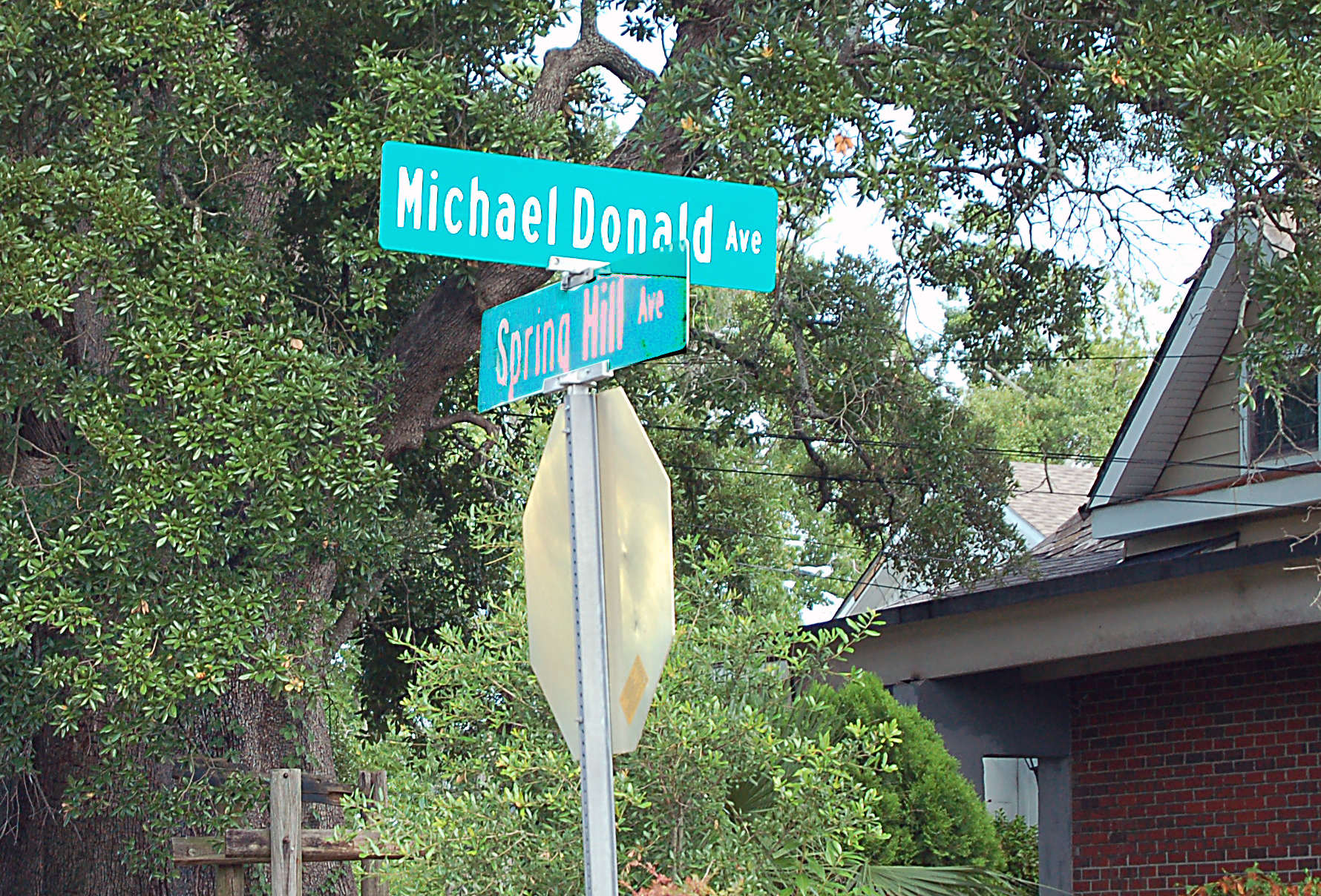
Michael Donald Avenue

In 2006, Mobile commemorated Michael Donald by renaming Herndon Avenue, where the murderers had hanged Donald's body, after Donald. Mobile's first black mayor, Sam Jones, presided over a small gathering of Donald's family and local leaders at the commemoration.

Donald's murder has been the subject of several works of fiction and nonfiction. The Texan political commentator Molly Ivins told the story of the Donald family in her essay, "Beulah Mae Donald," which appeared in her 1991 anthology, Molly Ivins Can't Say That, Can She?. Ravi Howard wrote a novel, Like Trees, Walking (2007), based on the murder. He won the Ernest J. Gaines Award for Literary Excellence in 2008 for it. Laurence Leamer wrote a book, The Lynching: The Epic Courtroom Battle That Brought Down the Klan (2016), chronicling the case.

In film and television, the 1991 film Line of Fire (also called Blind Hate) depicts the civil court case related to the murder. Ted Koppel created "The Last Lynching", a Discovery Channel television program about US civil rights history that aired in October 2008. It centered on the murder of Michael Donald, the criminal prosecution of his killers, and the civil suit against the UKA. The National Geographic's Inside American Terror series explored Donald's murder in a 2008 episode about the KKK. In 2021, CNN produced a four-episode miniseries, The People v. The Klan, that focused on Beulah Mae Donald's lawsuit against the UKA.

== See also ==
- Capital punishment in Alabama
- Capital punishment in the United States
- List of people executed in Alabama
- List of people executed in the United States in 1997
- List of white defendants executed for killing a black victim
- Race and capital punishment in the United States
