= Beulah Mae Donald =

American who sued the KKK (1920–1998)

- Donald in 1981
- Born: October 10, 1920; DeLisle, Mississippi, U.S.
- Died: September 17, 1988 (aged 67); Mobile, Alabama, U.S.
- Known for: Successfully suing the Ku Klux Klan
- Children: 7, including Michael Donald

Beulah Mae Donald (October 10, 1920 – September 17, 1988) was an American who successfully sued the Ku Klux Klan in the 1980s after her son, Michael Donald, was lynched.

== Early and personal life ==
Donald was born on October 10, 1920, in DeLisle, Mississippi, to Marion Gregory, a worker in a saw mill, and Mary Gregory, a laundress. The youngest child in a family of eight children, she helped her family and was raised as a devout member of the Southern Baptist Convention. Donald moved to Mobile, Alabama, with her family, where she became pregnant in tenth grade and was forced to leave school and work in a hotel. By the 1960s, Donald had two children and was living as a divorced single mother.

Early in that decade, Donald met David Donald and the two were soon married. They had five children before divorcing, after David moved to New York City. Beulah initially moved with him, but returned to Mobile after several years to care for her parents.

== Lawsuit against the Ku Klux Klan ==
On March 21, 1981, Beulah's youngest child, Michael Donald, was lynched by members of the Ku Klux Klan (KKK); he was beaten and choked, had his throat slit, and was hanged from a tree. While some authorities initially argued that his killing was not connected to the KKK and may have instead been motivated by a drug deal or affair, Donald disagreed and set out to clear Michael's name. When the investigation stalled in the summer of 1981, protests were organized to urge its continuation. Two years later, two men were convicted of murdering Michael.

After the lynching, Donald was approached by a lawyer working for the Southern Poverty Law Center, Morris Dees, who suggested suing the KKK. Donald agreed and became part of the lawsuit, which was filed in her name in 1984. It targeted Unit 900 of the KKK, which was considered "one of the largest and most violent of the groups". Dees later described Donald's involvement as "critical to the case". Donald refused to settle for $1 million and pushed for a full trial. During the trials following her son's death, Donald opposed the death penalty and told a Klansman: "I do forgive you. From the day I found out who you all was, I asked God to take care of y'all, and he has." On February 12, 1987, after six years, a $7 million judgment was passed in her favor by an all-white jury. Unit 900 was forced to file for bankruptcy and by November 1987, Donald had received none of the money. Donald told the press that "I wanted to be assured ... I wasn't even thinking about the money. If I hadn't gotten a cent, it wouldn't have mattered. I wanted to know how and why they did it." Donald's attorney, Michael Figures, said that she represented "the rock on which all of this was ultimately built".

Ms. named Donald one of the 1987 women of the year and Essence gave her an award the following year. She received a Candace Award in 1988.

== Death ==
Donald died of natural causes on September 17, 1988, in a Mobile hospital. The lawsuit was the first time that the KKK was held financially liable for actions that its members had taken. When she died, Donald had no will, and two of her daughters oversaw her estate.
