= Vivian Davis Figures =

American politician

Vivian Figures
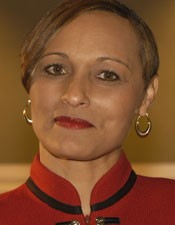

Member of the Alabama Senate from the 33rd district
- Incumbent
- Assumed office January 28, 1997
- Preceded by: Michael Figures

Member of the Mobile City Council
- In office January 1993 – January 1997
- Succeeded by: Fred Richardson

Personal details
- Born: January 24, 1957 (age 69) Mobile, Alabama, U.S.
- Party: Democratic
- Spouse: Michael Figures (m. 1982; died 1996)
- Children: 4, including Shomari
- Education: University of New Haven (BA); Faulkner University (attended)

Vivian Davis Figures (born January 24, 1957) is an American politician who is a Democratic member of the Alabama Senate, representing the 33rd District in Mobile County since she was elected on January 28, 1997, to serve the remaining term of her deceased husband, Senator Michael Figures, who was the president pro tempore of the Alabama Senate. She was re-elected without opposition in 1998 and 2002.

== Early life and career ==
Figures graduated from Williamson High School in Mobile, Alabama, and earned a Bachelor of Science in management science from the University of New Haven in Connecticut. She put herself through college by working at Yale University and in a family owned grocery. She was attending the Thomas Goode Jones School of Law in Montgomery, Alabama, when her husband's death forced her to discontinue her legal education.

Figures is president and CEO of Figures Legacy Education Foundation, and serves on the board of directors of the Mobile Area Education Foundation. She is a past at-large member of the Democratic National Committee. She was initiated into the Delta Theta Omega chapter of Alpha Kappa Alpha sorority in 2002. Since 2012, Figures has been on the Board of Trustees of Jacksonville State University.

== Political career ==
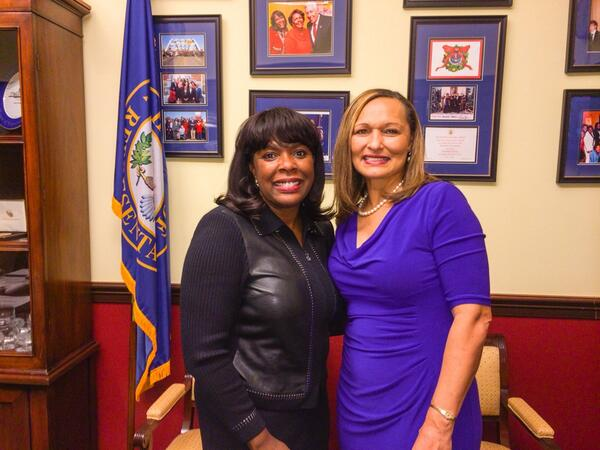
Figures and U.S. Representative Terri Sewell in 2013

Figures was elected to the Mobile City Council in 1993. She was known as a staunch community advocate. Early in her council career, she led the opposition to a proposed facility for burning petroleum-contaminated oil near downtown Mobile. As a council member, Figures was also the initial proponent of naming Mobile's new minor league baseball park for home run legend Hank Aaron, a Mobile native.

Following her husband's death in 1996, Figures ran for his seat in the Alabama Senate. She earned the most votes in the first round of the Democratic Party's primary election, with 47 percent, but missed the majority needed to avoid a runoff election. She defeated James Buskey in the runoff, before defeating Republican Gregory Ramos to win election to the state senate. Figures was sworn into office in January 1997, becoming the first African-American woman from Mobile County in the senate. In the Alabama Senate, Figures serves as the chairwoman of the Education and Mobile County Local Legislation Committees. In the legislature, Figures may be best known as the perennial sponsor of a bill to ban smoking in indoor, public places statewide in Alabama. In the 2008 general session, the bill passed the Senate, was believed to have sufficient support to pass the House, and Governor Bob Riley had indicated he would sign it. The bill died when legislative filibusters prevented a final vote in the House. Figures was also instrumental in the passage of economic incentives that were critical in the location of a Thyssen-Krupp steel plant near Mobile.

In the 2008 election, Figures became the first African American woman to become the Democratic nominee for the United States Senate running against incumbent Republican Jeff Sessions, after winning the June 2008 Democratic primary with 64% of the vote. Aaron campaigned for Figures and hosted fundraisers in several Alabama cities. On November 4, she was defeated by Sessions with 37% of the vote to Sessions's 63%.

In November 2012, Alabama Senate Democrats selected Figures to be their floor leader for the next two-year term. She became the first woman to lead either the majority or minority party in either house of the Alabama Legislature.

In April 2019, Davis Figures announced that she would run for chair of the Alabama Democratic Party. She dropped out of the race in June.

Davis Figures led the opposition to a bill restricting abortion, with a penalty of 99 years imprisonment for any doctor performing an abortion, and no exceptions for rape or incest. She proposed an amendment outlawing vasectomies, arguing that "there’s no law on the books anywhere in this country that mandate[s] what a man can and can’t do with his body, yet for us there are a number of them."

In April, 2020, amidst the COVID-19 pandemic, Davis Figures expressed concerns about the following legislative session, which was to start in May, due to COVID-19, saying “Many of our members as well as the staff have small children at home and/or elderly family members for whom they are responsible. Why would you put all those lives at risk for something that can wait?”

In 2021, Davis Figures' house in Toulminville, Alabama, was attacked by an unknown assailant. 23 shots were fired into her home, but there were no injuries, as the house was empty at the time.

Davis Figures supported Roe v. Wade. Following its overturn in 2022, she and most of her Democratic colleagues in the Alabama Senate, particularly senator Merika Coleman, sponsored bills designed to protect abortion, although none of them were passed.

== Personal life ==
Figures has three sons. Her middle son, current United States Representative for Alabama's 2nd district, Shomari Figures, worked for the Obama administration and as deputy chief of staff for Merrick Garland while he was attorney general of the United States. Her youngest, Jelani, played basketball on scholarship for Morehouse College from 2007 to 2011.

== See also ==
- Black women in American politics
- List of African-American United States Senate candidates

Party political offices
Preceded by Susan Parker	Democratic nominee for U.S. Senator from Alabama (Class 2); 2008	Vacant Title next held by Doug Jones; 2017
