= Sam Jones (Alabama politician) =

American politician (born 1947)

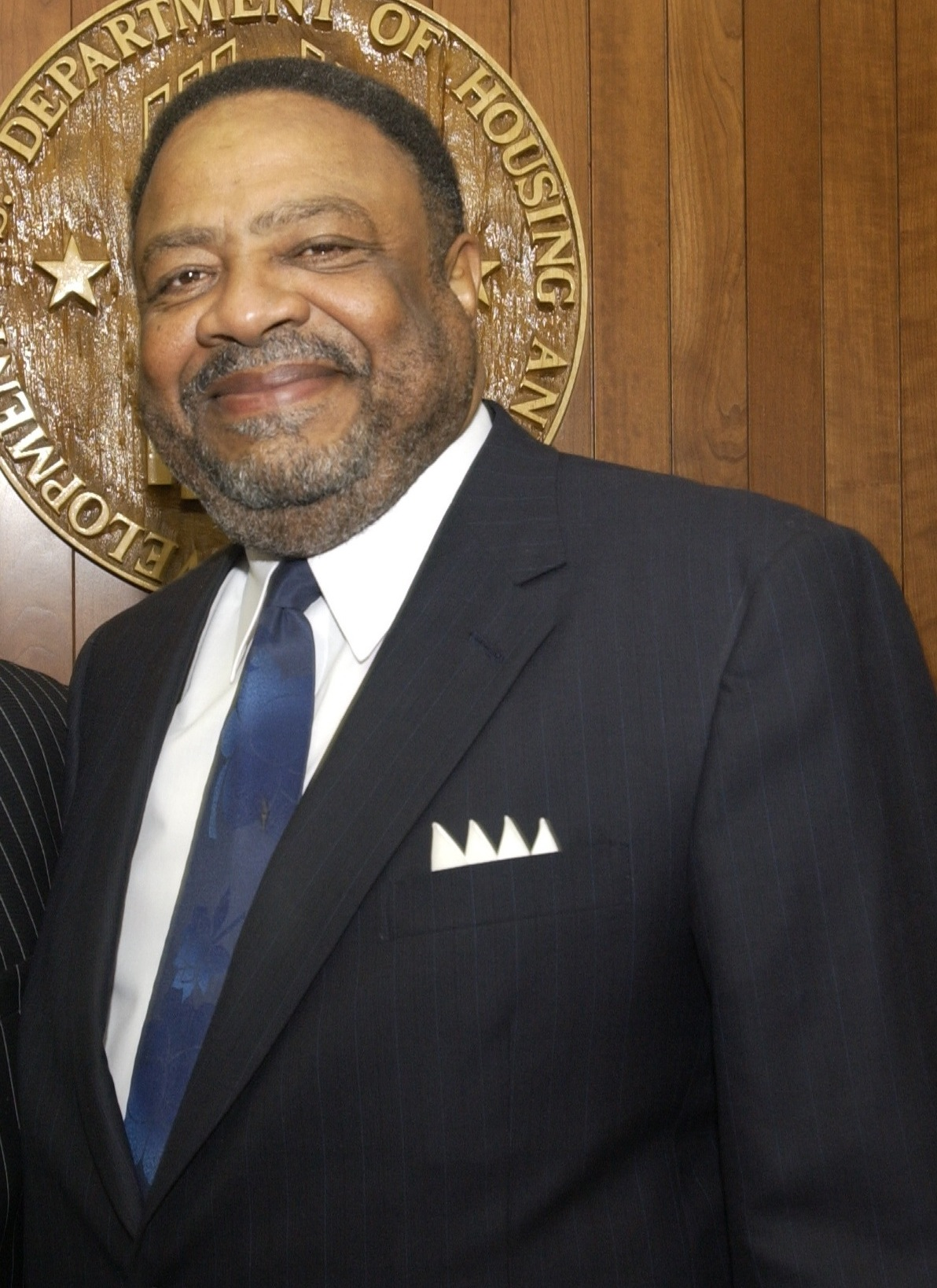

Member of the Alabama House of Representatives from the 99th district
- Incumbent
- Assumed office November 7, 2018
- Preceded by: James Buskey

107th Mayor of Mobile
- In office September 2005 – August 2013
- Preceded by: Mike Dow
- Succeeded by: Sandy Stimpson

Member of the Mobile County Commission from the 1st district
- In office 1987–2005
- Preceded by: Douglas Wicks
- Succeeded by: Juan Chastang

Personal details
- Born: April 14, 1947 (age 79) Mobile, Alabama, U.S.
- Party: Democratic
- Education: Jacksonville University

Military service
- Allegiance: United States of America
- Branch/service: United States Navy
- Unit: USS Forrestal (CV-59)

Samuel Leon Jones (born April 14, 1947) is an American politician who currently represents District 99 in the Alabama House of Representatives. Jones was the first African-American mayor of Mobile, Alabama, serving from September 2005 until August 2013. He ran on a platform of safety, efficient government, historic preservation and bringing new employers to the city. He is a member of the Democratic Party.

== Early life and education ==
Jones is a graduate of Central High School and attended Florida Junior College and Jacksonville University in Jacksonville, Florida.

== Career ==
Jones served for nine years in the U.S. Navy, where he served aboard the aircraft carrier USS Forrestal. While there, his commanding officer was John McCain, future senator from Arizona and presidential candidate.

After leaving the navy, Jones worked as the executive director of Mobile Community Action, Inc. from 1980 until 1987. Getting involved in politics through the Democratic Party, he was elected to four terms as a Mobile County Commissioner.

In September 2005 he ran for Mayor of Mobile and was elected. He was the first African-American Mayor of Mobile, Alabama. He served two four-year terms, winning re-election in 2009. On August 27, 2013, Jones was defeated by Sandy Stimpson in the 2013 mayoral election.

On October 29, 2013, the Mobile City Council unanimously voted to pass a resolution to rename Mobile Government Plaza the Samuel L. Jones Government Plaza for his service to the city. Official renaming of the building is pending approval by the Mobile County Commission.

In 2018, Jones was elected to the Alabama House of Representatives, representing District 99.
