= Michael Figures =

American politician (1947–1996)

President pro tempore of the Alabama Senate
- In office January 10, 1995 – September 13, 1996
- Preceded by: Ryan deGraffenried Jr.
- Succeeded by: Dewayne Freeman

Member of the Alabama Senate from the 33rd district
- In office November 8, 1978 – September 13, 1996
- Preceded by: Mike Perloff
- Succeeded by: Vivian Davis Figures

Personal details
- Born: October 13, 1947 Mobile, Alabama, U.S.
- Died: September 13, 1996 (aged 48) Mobile, Alabama, U.S.
- Party: Democratic
- Spouse: Vivian Davis (m. 1982)
- Children: 4, including Shomari
- Relatives: Thomas Figures (brother)
- Education: Stillman College (BA); University of Alabama (JD)

Michael Anthony Figures (October 13, 1947 – September 13, 1996) was an American lawyer and politician who served in the Alabama Senate from the 33rd district from 1978 until his death in 1996. He served as the body's president pro tempore after he was elected to the position in 1995. His wife Vivian Davis Figures succeeded him in office after his death. Figures argued a wrongful death civil suit against the Ku Klux Klan for the lynching of Michael Donald, winning a judgment that bankrupted the United Klans of America.

== Early life ==
Figures was born on October 13, 1947, in Mobile, Alabama. His father worked as a groundskeeper for International Paper and a sexton for a church.

Figures graduated from Hillsdale High School, an all-Black high school, earned a Bachelor of Arts at Stillman College in 1969, and earned a Juris Doctor from the University of Alabama School of Law in 1972. He was one of the first three Black graduates of the school.

== Career ==
Figures worked in law firms in Greene County and Selma, where he worked with J. L. Chestnut Jr.

In 1978, Figures ran for the Alabama Senate in the 33rd district. He defeated incumbent Mike Perloff in the Democratic Party's primary election. He became one of three Black members of the Alabama Senate. During his first term in office, Figures took part in a filibuster against the death penalty. Figures sponsored the bill that created the "Helping Schools" car tags, raising hundreds of thousands of dollars for Alabama schools each year.

In 1982, Figures and Joe L. Reed, the chair of the Alabama Democratic Conference (ADC) had a falling out over endorsements. Figures wanted to endorse George McMillan for governor of Alabama, but the ADC had not made an endorsement. In 1984, Figures endorsed Jesse Jackson for president of the United States and served as the Alabama state chair of his presidential campaign. Afterwards, he decided to form the New South Coalition to endorse progressive candidates and causes.

After the lynching of Michael Donald in 1981, Figures was called to the scene when the body was discovered. Two members of the Ku Klux Klan were arrested for the murder and Thomas Figures, Michael's brother and an assistant district attorney, tried them and earned convictions for the murder. Michael Figures and Morris Dees of the Southern Poverty Law Center represented Donald's mother, Beulah Mae Donald, in a civil suit for wrongful death against the United Klans of America (UKA). In 1987, they won a $7 million judgment ($19,837,434 in current dollar terms) against the UKA, bankrupting the organization.

In January 1995, the Alabama Senate elected Figures as president pro tempore.

== Personal life ==
Figures was married to Vivian Davis Figures, who served on Mobile's city council. They had four sons. Their son Shomari Figures has been a member of the United States House of Representatives for Alabama's 2nd congressional district since 2025.

Figures became ill on September 11, 1996, and had surgery to repair an intracranial aneurysm at University of South Alabama Medical Center the following day. He died there on September 13, 1996. Vivian won the special election to succeed Michael in the state senate.
