= List of Alabama state legislative districts =

This article will list the numerous district plans enacted by the Alabama Legislature in use for elections to its House and Senate.

While the Constitution of Alabama mandates that the state redraw state legislative district boundaries after every U.S. Census, the state has struggled to satisfy federal courts. The legislature did not attempt to redraw district boundaries for decades, with the state being forced to adopt new maps in 1962, 1965, 1973, 1982, and 1983. The maps adopted for the 1983 special elections marked the first time in the twentieth century that the state had apportioned itself to the U.S. Justice Department's liking.

== Current districts ==
=== Senate ===
Partisan makeup of the Alabama Senate as of August 2025.

To be used at the 2026, 2028, and 2030 elections. Enacted in 2022, modified in 2025. Districts in Bold were affected by court-ordered redistricting.

- 1st: Lauderdale–p. Limestone
- 2nd: p. Limestone–p. Madison
- 3rd: Morgan–p. Limestone–p. Madison
- 4th: Cullman–Marion–Winston
- 5th: Fayette–Lamar–Walker–p. Jefferson–p. Tuscaloosa
- 6th: Colbert–Franklin–Lawrence–p. Limestone
- 7th: p. Madison
- 8th: Jackson–p. DeKalb–p. Madison
- 9th: Marshall–p. Blount–p. Madison
- 10th: Cherokee–Etowah–p. DeKalb
- 11th: p. Shelby–p. St. Clair–p. Talladega
- 12th: Calhoun–p. Talladega
- 13th: Chambers–Clay–Cleburne–Randolph–p. Lee
- 14th: Bibb–p. Chilton–p. Shelby
- 15th: p. Jefferson–p. Shelby
- 16th: p. Jefferson–p. Shelby
- 17th: p. Blount–p. Jefferson–p. St. Clair
- 18th: p. Jefferson
- 19th: p. Jefferson
- 20th: p. Jefferson
- 21st: Pickens–p. Tuscaloosa
- 22nd: Escambia–Washington–p. Baldwin–p. Mobile
- 23rd: Butler–Clarke–Conecuh–Dallas–Lowndes–Monroe–Perry–Wilcox
- 24th: Choctaw–Greene–Hale–Marengo–Sumter–p. Tuscaloosa
- 25th: **Crenshaw–p. Montgomery**
- 26th: **p. Elmore–p. Montgomery**
- 27th: p. Lee–p. Russell–p. Tallapoosa
- 28th: Barbour–Bullock–Henry–Macon–p. Houston–p. Russell
- 29th: Geneva–p. Dale–p. Houston
- 30th: Autauga–Coosa–p. Chilton–p. Elmore–p. Tallapoosa
- 31st: Coffee–Covington–Pike–p. Dale
- 32nd: p. Baldwin
- 33rd: p. Baldwin–p. Mobile
- 34th: p. Mobile
- 35th: p. Mobile

== Former district plans ==
The following state legislative district plans are no longer in effect. Prior to 1965, House districts were not assigned by number, rather were apportioned to the various counties, with each having at least one. Counties created after the enactment of a plan were generally allotted representatives.

=== Enacted by 1852 act ===
The first district plan to enumerate state senate districts was enacted in 1852.

==== House ====
- Autauga: 1 member
- Baldwin: 1 member
- Barbour: 3 members
- Benton: 3 members
- Bibb: 2 members
- Blount: 2 members
- Butler: 2 members
- Chambers: 3 members
- Cherokee: 3 members
- Choctaw: 1 member
- Clarke: 1 member
- Coffee: 1 member
- Conecuh: 1 member
- Coosa: 2 members
- Covington: 1 member
- Dale: 1 member
- Dallas: 2 members
- DeKalb: 2 members
- Fayette: 2 members
- Franklin: 3 members
- Greene: 2 members
- Hancock: 1 member
- Henry: 2 members
- Jackson: 3 members
- Jefferson: 1 member
- Lauderdale: 2 members
- Lawrence: 2 members
- Limestone: 2 members
- Lowndes: 2 members
- Macon: 3 members
- Madison: 2 members
- Marengo: 2 members
- Marion: 1 member
- Marshall: 2 members
- Mobile: 4 members
- Monroe: 1 member
- Montgomery: 2 members
- Morgan: 1 member
- Perry: 2 members
- Pickens: 2 members
- Pike: 3 members
- Randolph: 2 members
- Russell: 2 members
- Shelby: 2 members
- St. Clair: 1 member
- Sumter: 2 members
- Talladega: 3 members
- Tallapoosa: 3 members
- Tuscaloosa: 2 members
- Walker: 1 member
- Washington: 1 member
- Wilcox: 2 members

==== State senate ====
- 1: Mobile
- 2: Baldwin–Clarke–Monroe
- 3: Coffee–Conecuh–Covington
- 4: Dale–Henry
- 5: Barbour
- 6: Pike
- 7: Russell
- 8: Macon
- 9: Autauga–Montgomery
- 10: Dallas–Wilcox
- 11: Choctaw–Sumter–Washington
- 12: Greene–Marengo
- 13: Bibb–Perry
- 14: Butler–Lowndes
- 15: Coosa
- 16: Tallapoosa
- 17: Chambers
- 18: Randolph
- 19: Talladega
- 20: Benton
- 21: Jefferson–Shelby
- 22: Tuscaloosa
- 23: Pickens
- 24: Fayette–Marion
- 25: Franklin
- 26: Hancock–Lawrence–Walker
- 27: Blount–St. Clair
- 28: Cherokee
- 29: De Kalb–Marshall
- 30: Jackson
- 31: Madison
- 32: Limestone–Morgan
- 33: Lauderdale

=== Enacted by 1867 act ===
==== House ====
Each county was apportioned one representative for every 5,029 residents. Counties in Bold gained members from or were created after the 1852 plan, and counties in Italics lost members.

- Autauga: 1 member
- Baldwin: 1 member
- Barbour: 2 members (–1)
- Bibb: 1 member (–1)
- Blount: 2 members
- **Bullock: 1 member (New)**
- Butler: 2 members
- Calhoun (Note: Renamed from Benton): 2 members (–1)
- Chambers: 2 members (–1)
- Cherokee: 2 members (–1)
- Choctaw: 1 member
- **Clarke: 2 members (+1)**
- **Clay: 1 member (New)**
- **Cleburne: 1 member (New)**
- **Coffee: 2 members (+1)**
- **Colbert: 1 member (New)**
- Conecuh: 1 member
- Coosa: 2 members
- Covington: 1 member
- Crenshaw: 1 member
- **Dale: 2 members (+1)**
- Dallas: 2 members
- DeKalb: 1 member (–1)
- **Elmore: 2 members (New)**
- **Etowah: 2 members (New)**
- Fayette: 1 member (–1)
- Franklin: 1 member (–2)
- Greene: 1 member (–1)
- **Hale: 1 member (New)**
- Henry: 2 members
- Jackson: 3 members
- **Jefferson: 2 members (+1)**
- **Lamar: 1 member (New)**
- Lauderdale: 2 members
- Lawrence: 2 members
- **Lee: 2 members (New)**
- Limestone: 1 member (–1)
- Lowndes: 1 member (–1)
- Macon: 1 member (–2)
- **Madison: 3 members (+1)**
- Marengo: 1 member (–1)
- Marion: 1 member (–1)
- Marshall: 1 member (–1)
- **Mobile: 7 members (+3)**
- Monroe: 1 member
- Montgomery: 2 members
- **Morgan: 2 members (+1)**
- Perry: 2 members
- Pickens: 2 members
- Pike: 2 members (–1)
- Randolph: 2 members
- Russell: 1 member (–1)
- Shelby: 2 members
- St. Clair: 1 member
- Sumter: 1 member (–1)
- Talladega: 2 members (–1)
- Tallapoosa: 2 members (–1)
- Tuscaloosa: 2 members
- Walker: 1 member
- Washington: 1 member
- Wilcox: 1 member (–1)
- Winston (Note: Renamed from Hancock): 1 member

==== Senate ====
Districts in Italics contain the same counties as the previous plan, but have different numbers. Asterisks (*) denote counties that did not exist at the enactment of the plan, but were included in these districts at their creation.

- 1: **Mobile**
- 2: **Baldwin–Clarke–Monroe**
- 3: Conecuh–Covington–Coffee–Escambia*–Geneva*–Houston*
- 4: **Dale–Henry**
- 5: Butler–Crenshaw
- 6: Pike–Bullock
- 7: Barbour
- 8: Macon–Russell
- 9: Montgomery
- 10: **Dallas–Wilcox**
- 11: Choctaw–Washington
- 12: Hale–Greene–Marengo
- 13: **Bibb–Perry**
- 14: Autauga–Lowndes
- 15: Coosa–Elmore
- 16: **Tallapoosa**
- 17: Chambers–Lee
- 18: Cleburne–Randolph
- 19: Clay–Talladega
- 20: Calhoun–St. Clair
- 21: Chilton*–Jefferson–Shelby
- 22: **Tuscaloosa**
- 23: Pickens–Sumter
- 24: Fayette–Lamar–Marion
- 25: Colbert–Franklin
- 26: Lauderdale
- 27: Lawrence–Walker–Winston
- 28: **Limestone–Morgan**
- 29: **Madison**
- 30: Blount–Cullman*–Marshall
- 31: Jackson
- 32: De Kalb–Etowah
- 33: Cherokee

=== Enacted by Constitution of 1875 ===
==== House (1875–1881) ====
Counties in Bold gained members from or were created after the 1867 plan, and counties in Italics lost members.

- Autauga: 1 member
- Baldwin: 1 member
- Barbour: 2 members
- Bibb: 1 member
- Blount: 1 member (−1)
- **Bullock: 2 members (+1)**
- Butler: 2 members
- Calhoun: 1 member (−1)
- Chambers: 2 members
- Cherokee: 1 member (−1)
- **Chilton: 1 member (New)**
- Choctaw: 1 member
- Clarke: 1 member (−1)
- Clay: 1 member
- Cleburne: 1 member
- Coffee: 1 member (−1)
- Colbert: 1 member
- Conecuh: 1 member
- Coosa: 1 member (−1)
- Covington: 1 member
- Crenshaw: 1 member
- Dale: 1 member (−1)
- **Dallas: 4 members (+2)**
- DeKalb: 1 member
- Elmore: 1 member (−1)
- **Escambia: 1 member (New)**
- Etowah: 1 member (−1)
- Fayette: 1 member
- Franklin: 1 member
- **Geneva: 1 member (New)**
- Greene: 2 members
- **Hale: 2 members (+1)**
- Henry: 1 member (−1)
- Jackson: 2 members (−1)
- Jefferson: 2 members
- Lamar: 1 member
- Lauderdale: 1 member (−1)
- Lawrence: 2 members
- Lee: 2 members
- **Limestone: 2 members (+1)**
- **Lowndes: 2 members (+1)**
- **Macon: 2 members (+1)**
- Madison: 3 members
- **Marengo: 2 members (+1)**
- Marion: 1 member
- Marshall: 1 member
- **Mobile: 5 members (+2)**
- Monroe: 1 member
- **Montgomery: 4 members (+2)**
- Morgan: 1 member (−1)
- Perry: 2 members
- Pickens: 2 members
- Pike: 2 members
- Randolph: 1 member (−1)
- **Russell: 2 members (+1)**
- Shelby: 1 member (−1)
- St. Clair: 1 member
- **Sumter: 2 members (+1)**
- Talladega: 2 members
- Tallapoosa: 2 members
- Tuscaloosa: 2 members
- Walker: 1 member
- Washington: 1 member
- **Wilcox: 2 members (+1)**
- Winston: 1 member

==== House (1881–1891) ====
Counties in Bold gained members from or were created after the 1875 plan, and counties in Italics lost members.

- Autauga: 1 member
- Baldwin: 1 member
- **Barbour: 3 members (+1)**
- Bibb: 1 member
- Blount: 1 member
- Bullock: 2 members
- Butler: 1 member (−1)
- Calhoun: 1 member
- Chambers: 2 members
- Cherokee: 1 member
- Chilton: 1 member
- Choctaw: 1 member
- Clarke: 1 member
- Clay: 1 member
- Cleburne: 1 member
- Coffee: 1 member
- Colbert: 1 member
- Conecuh: 1 member
- Coosa: 1 member
- Covington: 1 member
- Crenshaw: 1 member
- **Cullman: 1 member (New)**
- Dale: 1 member
- Dallas: 4 members
- DeKalb: 1 member
- Elmore: 1 member
- Escambia: 1 member
- Etowah: 1 member
- Fayette: 1 member
- Franklin: 1 member
- Geneva: 1 member
- Greene: 2 members
- Hale: 2 members
- Henry: 1 member
- Jackson: 2 members
- Jefferson: 2 members
- Lamar: 1 member
- **Lauderdale: 2 members (+1)**
- Lawrence: 2 members
- Lee: 2 members
- Limestone: 2 members
- Lowndes: 2 members
- Macon: 1 member (−1)
- Madison: 3 members
- Marengo: 2 members
- Marion: 1 member
- Marshall: 1 member
- Mobile: 4 members (−1)
- Monroe: 1 member
- Montgomery: 4 members
- Morgan: 1 member
- Perry: 2 members
- Pickens: 2 members
- Pike: 2 members
- Randolph: 1 member
- Russell: 2 members
- Shelby: 1 member
- St. Clair: 1 member
- Sumter: 2 members
- Talladega: 2 members
- Tallapoosa: 2 members
- Tuscaloosa: 2 members
- Walker: 1 member
- Washington: 1 member
- Wilcox: 2 members
- Winston: 1 member

==== Senate ====
Districts in Bold are unchanged from the previous plan, districts in Italics contain the same counties as the previous plan, but have different numbers. Asterisks (*) denote counties that did not exist at the enactment of the plan, but were included in these districts at their creation.

- 1: Lauderdale–Limestone
- 2: Colbert–Lawrence
- 3: Blount–Cullman*–Morgan–Winston
- 4: Madison
- 5: De Kalb–Jackson–Marshall
- 6: Cherokee–Etowah–St. Clair
- 7: Calhoun–Cleburne
- 8: Clay–Talladega
- 9: Chambers–Randolph
- 10: Macon–Tallapoosa
- 11: Bibb–Tuscaloosa
- 12: Fayette–Franklin–Lamar–Marion
- 13: Jefferson–Shelby–Walker
- 14: Greene–Pickens
- 15: Chilton–Coosa–Elmore
- 16: Autauga–Lowndes
- 17: Butler–Conecuh
- 18: Perry
- 19: Choctaw–Clarke–Washington
- 20: Marengo
- 21: Baldwin–Escambia–Monroe
- 22: Wilcox
- 23: Coffee–Dale–Geneva–Henry–Houston*
- 24: Barbour
- 25: Covington–Crenshaw–Pike
- 26: Bullock
- 27: Lee
- 28: Montgomery
- 29: Russell
- 30: Dallas
- 31: Sumter
- 32: Hale
- 33: Mobile

=== Enacted by 1891 act ===
==== House ====
The size of the House was set at one hundred members. Counties in Bold gained members from or were created after the 1881 plan, and counties in Italics lost members.

- Autauga: 1 member
- Baldwin: 1 member
- Barbour: 2 members (−1)
- Bibb: 1 member
- Blount: 1 member
- Bullock: 2 members
- Butler: 1 member
- **Calhoun: 2 members (+1)**
- Chambers: 2 members
- Cherokee: 1 member
- Chilton: 1 member
- Choctaw: 1 member
- **Clarke: 2 members (+1)**
- Clay: 1 member
- Cleburne: 1 member
- Coffee: 1 member
- Colbert: 1 member
- Conecuh: 1 member
- Coosa: 1 member
- Covington: 1 member
- Crenshaw: 1 member
- Cullman: 1 member
- Dale: 1 member
- Dallas: 3 members (−1)
- DeKalb: 1 member
- Elmore: 1 member
- Escambia: 1 member
- **Etowah: 2 members (+1)**
- Fayette: 1 member
- Franklin: 1 member
- Geneva: 1 member
- Greene: 1 member (−1)
- Hale: 2 members
- **Henry: 2 members (+1)**
- Jackson: 2 members
- **Jefferson: 6 members (+4)**
- Lamar: 1 member
- Lauderdale: 2 members
- Lawrence: 1 member (−1)
- Lee: 2 members
- Limestone: 1 member (−1)
- Lowndes: 2 members
- Macon: 1 member
- Madison: 2 members (−1)
- Marengo: 2 members
- Marion: 1 member
- Marshall: 1 member
- Mobile: 3 members (−1)
- Monroe: 1 member
- Montgomery: 4 members
- **Morgan: 2 members (+1)**
- Perry: 2 members
- Pickens: 1 member (−1)
- Pike: 2 members
- Randolph: 1 member
- Russell: 2 members
- Shelby: 1 member
- St. Clair: 1 member
- Sumter: 2 members
- Talladega: 2 members
- Tallapoosa: 2 members
- Tuscaloosa: 2 members
- Walker: 1 member
- Washington: 1 member
- Wilcox: 2 members
- Winston: 1 member

==== Senate ====
Districts in Bold are unchanged from the previous plan. Asterisks (*) denote counties that did not exist at the enactment of the plan, but were included in these districts at their creation.

- 1: **Lauderdale–Limestone**
- 2: Lawrence–Morgan
- 3: Blount–Cullman–Winston
- 4: **Madison**
- 5: Jackson–Marshall
- 6: Etowah–St. Clair
- 7: **Calhoun–Cleburne**
- 8: **Clay–Talladega**
- 9: **Chambers–Randolph**
- 10: Coosa–Tallapoosa
- 11: Tuscaloosa
- 12: Fayette–Lamar–Walker
- 13: Jefferson
- 14: Pickens–Sumter
- 15: Chilton–Elmore–Shelby
- 16: **Autauga–Lowndes**
- 17: Butler–Conecuh–Covington
- 18: **Bibb–Perry**
- 19: **Choctaw–Clarke–Washington**
- 20: **Marengo**
- 21: **Baldwin–Escambia–Monroe**
- 22: **Wilcox**
- 23: Dale–Geneva–Henry–Houston*
- 24: **Barbour**
- 25: Coffee–Crenshaw–Pike
- 26: Bullock–Macon
- 27: Lee–Russell
- 28: **Montgomery**
- 29: Cherokee–De Kalb
- 30: **Dallas**
- 31: Colbert–Franklin–Marion
- 32: Greene–Hale
- 33: **Mobile**

=== Enacted by Constitution of 1901 ===
==== House ====
Counties in Bold gained members from or were created after the 1891 plan, and counties in Italics lost members. Houston was created in 1902, and was given one representative.

- Autauga: 1 member
- Baldwin: 1 member
- Barbour: 2 members
- Bibb: 1 member
- Blount: 1 member
- Bullock: 2 members
- **Butler: 2 members (+1)**
- Calhoun: 2 members
- Chambers: 2 members
- Cherokee: 1 member
- Chilton: 1 member
- Choctaw: 1 member
- Clarke: 2 members
- Clay: 1 member
- Cleburne: 1 member
- Coffee: 1 member
- Colbert: 1 member
- Conecuh: 1 member
- Coosa: 1 member
- Covington: 1 member
- Crenshaw: 1 member
- Cullman: 1 member
- Dale: 1 member
- Dallas: 3 members
- DeKalb: 1 member
- **Elmore: 2 members (+1)**
- Escambia: 1 member
- Etowah: 2 members
- Fayette: 1 member
- Franklin: 1 member
- Geneva: 1 member
- Greene: 1 member
- Hale: 2 members
- Henry: 2 members
- Jackson: 2 members
- **Jefferson: 7 members (+1)**
- Lamar: 1 member
- Lauderdale: 2 members
- Lawrence: 1 member
- Lee: 2 members
- Limestone: 1 member
- Lowndes: 2 members
- Macon: 1 member
- Madison: 2 members
- Marengo: 2 members
- Marion: 1 member
- Marshall: 1 member
- Mobile: 3 members
- Monroe: 1 member
- Montgomery: 4 members
- Morgan: 2 members
- Perry: 2 members
- Pickens: 1 member
- Pike: 2 members
- Randolph: 1 member
- Russell: 2 members
- Shelby: 1 member
- St. Clair: 1 member
- Sumter: 2 members
- Talladega: 2 members
- Tallapoosa: 2 members
- Tuscaloosa: 2 members
- **Walker: 2 members (+1)**
- Washington: 1 member
- Wilcox: 2 members
- Winston: 1 member

==== Senate ====
Results of the 1958 state senate election, the last to use the plan.

Districts in Bold are unchanged from the previous plan. Asterisks (*) denote counties that did not exist at the enactment of the plan, but were included in these districts at their creation.

- 1: **Lauderdale–Limestone**
- 2: **Lawrence–Morgan**
- 3: **Blount–Cullman–Winston**
- 4: **Madison**
- 5: **Jackson–Marshall**
- 6: **Etowah–St. Clair**
- 7: Calhoun
- 8: Talladega
- 9: **Chambers–Randolph**
- 10: Elmore–Tallapoosa
- 11: **Tuscaloosa**
- 12: **Fayette–Lamar–Walker**
- 13: **Jefferson**
- 14: **Pickens–Sumter**
- 15: Autauga–Chilton–Shelby
- 16: Lowndes
- 17: **Butler–Conecuh–Covington**
- 18: **Bibb–Perry**
- 19: **Choctaw–Clarke–Washington**
- 20: **Marengo**
- 21: **Baldwin–Escambia–Monroe**
- 22: **Wilcox**
- 23: Dale–Geneva
- 24: **Barbour**
- 25: **Coffee–Crenshaw–Pike**
- 26: **Bullock–Macon**
- 27: **Lee–Russell**
- 28: **Montgomery**
- 29: **Cherokee–De Kalb**
- 30: **Dallas**
- 31: **Colbert–Franklin–Marion**
- 32: **Greene–Hale**
- 33: **Mobile**
- 34: Clay–Cleburne–Coosa
- 35: Henry–Houston*

=== Enacted by 1962 court-ordered redistricting ===
==== House ====
Counties in Bold gained members after the 1901/1902 reapportionment, and counties in Italics lost members.

- Autauga: 1 member
- Baldwin: 1 member
- Barbour: 1 member (−1)
- Bibb: 1 member
- Blount: 1 member
- Bullock: 1 members (−1)
- Butler: 1 members (−1)
- **Calhoun: 3 members (+1)**
- Chambers: 1 members (−1)
- Cherokee: 1 member
- Chilton: 1 member
- Choctaw: 1 member
- Clarke: 1 members (−1)
- Clay: 1 member
- Cleburne: 1 member
- Coffee: 1 member
- Colbert: 1 member
- Conecuh: 1 member
- Coosa: 1 member
- Covington: 1 member
- Crenshaw: 1 member
- Cullman: 1 member
- Dale: 1 member
- Dallas: 2 members (−1)
- DeKalb: 1 member
- Elmore: 1 members (−1)
- Escambia: 1 member
- **Etowah: 3 members (+1)**
- Fayette: 1 member
- Franklin: 1 member
- Geneva: 1 member
- Greene: 1 member
- Hale: 1 member (−1)
- Henry: 1 member (−1)
- Houston: 1 member
- Jackson: 1 member (−1)
- **Jefferson: 17 members (+10)**
- Lamar: 1 member
- Lauderdale: 2 members
- Lawrence: 1 member
- Lee: 1 member (−1)
- Limestone: 1 member
- Lowndes: 1 member (−1)
- Macon: 1 member
- **Madison: 3 members (+1)**
- Marengo: 1 member (−1)
- Marion: 1 member
- Marshall: 1 member
- **Mobile: 8 members (+5)**
- Monroe: 1 member
- Montgomery: 4 members
- Morgan: 2 members
- Perry: 1 member (−1)
- Pickens: 1 member
- Pike: 1 member (−1)
- Randolph: 1 member
- Russell: 1 member (−1)
- Shelby: 1 member
- St. Clair: 1 member
- Sumter: 1 member (−1)
- Talladega: 2 members
- Tallapoosa: 1 member (−1)
- **Tuscaloosa: 3 members (+1)**
- Walker: 2 members
- Washington: 1 member
- Wilcox: 1 member (−1)
- Winston: 1 member

==== Senate ====
Results of the 1962 state senate election, the only to use the plan.

Used at the 1962 election. Districts in Bold are unchanged from the previous plan.

- 1: **Lauderdale–Limestone**
- 2: **Lawrence–Morgan**
- 3: **Cullman–Winston**
- 4: **Madison**
- 5: **Jackson–Marshall**
- 6: Etowah
- 7: **Calhoun**
- 8: **Talladega**
- 9: **Chambers–Randolph**
- 10: **Elmore–Tallapoosa**
- 11: **Tuscaloosa**
- 12: Fayette–Walker
- 13: **Jefferson**
- 14: Lamar–Pickens
- 15: **Autauga–Chilton–Shelby**
- 16: Monroe–Wilcox
- 17: **Butler–Conecuh–Covington**
- 18: **Bibb–Perry**
- 19: **Choctaw–Clarke–Washington**
- 20: Marengo–Sumter
- 21: Baldwin–Escambia
- 22: Blount–St. Clair
- 23: **Dale–Geneva**
- 24: Barbour–Pike
- 25: Coffee–Crenshaw
- 26: **Bullock–Macon**
- 27: **Lee–Russell**
- 28: **Montgomery**
- 29: **Cherokee–De Kalb**
- 30: Dallas–Lowndes
- 31: **Colbert–Franklin–Marion**
- 32: **Greene–Hale**
- 33: **Mobile**
- 34: **Clay–Cleburne–Coosa**
- 35: **Henry–Houston**

=== Enacted by 1965 court-ordered redistricting ===
==== House ====
Results of the 1970 state house election, the last to use the plan.

The 1965 redistricting organized counties into numbered state house districts for the first time. Districts in Bold collectively gained members, and districts in Italics collectively lost members from the 1962 reapportionment. The numbers in the parenthesis denote how many members all of the counties involved lost or gained from the 1962 reapportionment under its boundaries.

- 1: Lauderdale: 2 members
- 2: Lawrence−Limestone: 2 members
- **3: Madison: 5 members (+2)**
- 4: Jackson: 1 member
- 5: Colbert−Franklin: 2 members
- 6: Morgan: 2 members
- **7: Cullman−Marshall: 3 members (+1)**
- 8: Cherokee−DeKalb: 2 members
- 9: Marion−Winston: 1 member (−1)
- 10: Blount: 1 member
- 11: Etowah: 3 members
- 12: Fayette−Lamar (−1)
- 13: Walker: 2 members
- **14: Jefferson: 20 members (+3)**
- 15: St. Clair: 1 member
- 16: Calhoun: 3 members
- 17: Greene−Pickens: 1 member (−1)
- **18: Tuscaloosa: 4 members (+1)**
- 19: Shelby: 1 member
- 20: Talladega: 2 members
- 21: Clay−Coosa: 1 member (−1)
- 22: Cleburne−Randolph: 1 member (−1)
- 23: Bibb−Hale: 1 member (−1)
- 24: Chilton: 1 member
- 25: Tallapoosa: 1 member
- 26: Chambers: 1 member
- 27: Sumter−Marengo−Perry: 2 members (−1)
- 28: Dallas: 2 members
- 29: Autauga−Lowndes: 1 member (−1
- 30: Elmore: 1 member
- 31: Barbour−Bullock−Macon: 2 members (−1)
- **32: Lee−Russell: 3 members (+1)**
- 33: Choctaw−Clarke−Washington: 2 members (−1)
- 34: Conecuh−Monroe−Wilcox: 2 members (−1)
- **35: Montgomery: 5 members (+1)**
- 36: Butler−Crenshaw−Pike: 2 members (−1)
- **37: Mobile: 10 members (+2)**
- **38: Baldwin: 2 members (+1)**
- 39: Escambia: 1 member
- 40: Covington−Geneva: 2 members
- 41: Coffee: 1 member
- 42: Dale: 1 member
- 43: Henry−Houston: 2 members

==== Senate ====
Results of the 1970 state senate election, the last to use the plan.

Used at the 1966 and 1970 elections. Districts in Bold are unchanged from the previous plan, districts in Italics contain the same counties as the previous plan, but have different numbers.

- 1: Colbert–Lauderdale
- 2: Limestone–Morgan
- 3: Madison
- 4: Cherokee–DeKalb–Jackson
- 5: Franklin–Lawrence–Marion–Winston
- 6: Cullman–Walker
- 7: Blount–Marshall–St. Clair
- 8: Etowah
- 9: Calhoun
- 10: Fayette–Greene–Hale–Lamar–Pickens
- 11: **Tuscaloosa**
- 12: Jefferson (7 members)
- 13: Clay–Cleburne–Talladega
- 14: Bibb–Dallas–Perry
- 15: Autauga–Chilton–Coosa–Shelby
- 16: Elmore–Macon–Tallapoosa
- 17: Chambers–Lee–Randolph
- 18: Choctaw–Marengo–Sumter–Washington
- 19: Clarke–Conecuh–Monroe–Wilcox
- 20: Butler–Covington–Crenshaw–Lowndes
- 21: Montgomery (2 members)
- 22: Bullock–Coffee–Geneva–Pike
- 23: Barbour–Henry–Russell
- 24: Mobile (3 members)
- 25: Baldwin–Escambia
- 26: Dale–Houston
