= 1970 Alabama Senate election =

- November 3, 1970

All 35 seats in the Alabama State Senate 18 seats needed for a majority
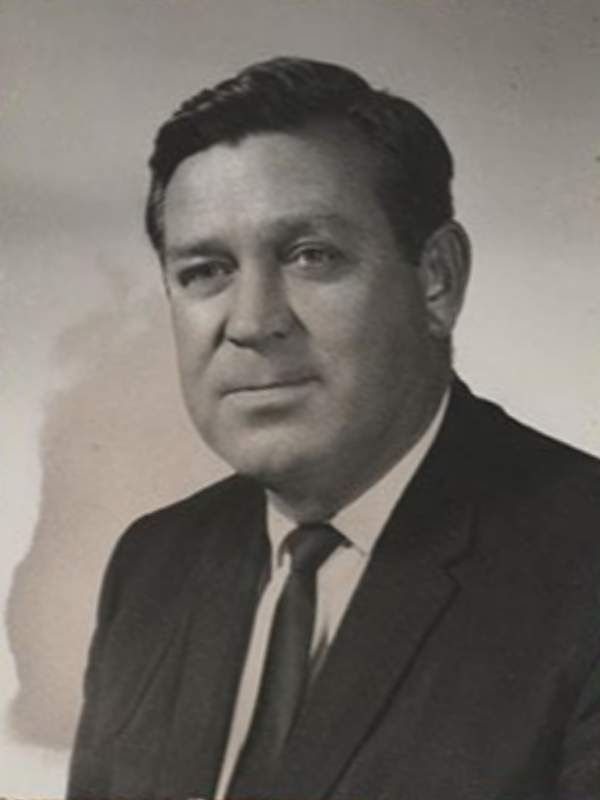

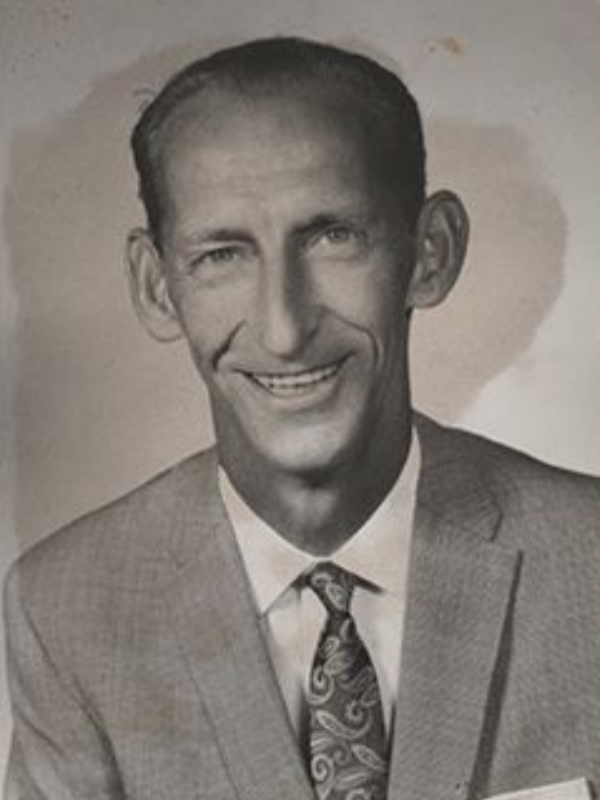
	Majority party	Minority party	Third party
Leader	O.J. Goodwyn (did not stand)	—	Leland Childs (lost re-election) (Note: Ran in the Democratic primaries)
Party	Democratic	National Democratic	Republican
Leader since	January 10, 1967	—	January 10, 1967
Leader's seat	24th p. 2	—	12th p. 2
Last election	34 seats, 61.2%	New	1 seat, 37.6%
Seats won	35	0	0
Seat change	▲1	Steady	▼1
Popular vote	1,246,646	188,808	7,469
Percentage	82.51%	12.50%	0.49%
- Democratic hold Democratic gain Democratic: 50–60% 60–70% 70–80% 80–90% 90–100% Unopposed
President pro tempore before election
O.J. Goodwyn
Democratic
Elected President pro tempore
Pierre Pelham
Democratic

The 1970 Alabama Senate election took place on Tuesday, November 3, 1970, to elect 35 representatives to serve four-year terms in the Alabama Senate. Every single seat was won by a white male Democrat. In the previous general election, one Republican, Leland Childs, was elected, but had unsuccessfully sought re-election as a Democrat.

The Democratic primaries were held on May 5 with runoffs on June 2, which candidates had until February 28 to qualify for. Neither the Republican Party nor the NDPA held primaries for state office, instead opting to nominate by party convention. The Republican convention took place in Birmingham on July 17.

This was the last state senate election in Alabama before a 1973 federal court order mandated a new legislative map with single-member districts. At this point, the state had used a mixed system of single-member and multi-member districts to allocate seats in the legislature, all based on pre-existing county lines.

== Summary ==
Apportionment of the Alabama Senate as of 1970: Single-member: 1-county 2-county 3-county 4-county 5-county (District 10) / Multi-member: 2-member (21st; Montgomery) 3-member (24th; Mobile) 7-member (12th; Jefferson)

Party	Candidates			Seats		
Party	Num.	Vote	%	Before	Won	+/–
Democratic	35	1,246,646	82.51%	34	35	▲1
NDPA	13	188,808	12.50%	0	0	Steady
Conservative	9	51,668	3.42%	0	0	Steady
Independent Party	2	13,359	0.88%	0	0	Steady
Republican	2	7,469	0.49%	1	0	▼1
Whig	1	2,877	0.19%	0	0	Steady
Write-in	—	7	0.0005%	—	0	Steady
Total	62	1,510,827	100%	35	35	Steady

=== By district ===
†: Incumbent did not run for reelection. ‡: Lost re-nomination.

District	Incumbent	Party	Elected Senator	Party
1st	Stewart O'Bannon	Dem	Stewart O'Bannon	Dem
2nd	Bob Harris	Dem	Bob Harris	Dem
3rd	Jack Giles	Dem	Gene McLain	Dem
4th	Dan Stone‡	Dem	Kenneth Hammond	Dem
5th	Emmet Oden †	Dem	Joe Fine	Dem
6th	Fred Folsom †	Dem	Bob Wilson	Dem
7th	Aubrey Carr	Dem	Aubrey Carr	Dem
8th	Ollie Nabors †	Dem	Richard Malone	Dem
9th	Woodrow Albea‡	Dem	Fred Ray Lybrand	Dem
10th	Jimmy Branyon	Dem	Jimmy Branyon	Dem
11th	E. W. Skidmore †	Dem	Richard Shelby	Dem
12th p. 1	Pat Vacca	Dem	Pat Vacca	Dem
12th p. 2	Leland Childs	Rep (Note: First elected as a Republican, unsuccessfully ran for re-election as a Democrat)	Tom King	Dem
12th p. 3	John Hawkins	Dem	John Hawkins	Dem
12th p. 4	Richard Dominick	Dem	Richard Dominick	Dem
12th p. 5	George L. Bailes	Dem	George L. Bailes	Dem
12th p. 6	Eddie H. Gilmore	Dem	Eddie H. Gilmore	Dem
12th p. 7	Hugh Morrow †	Dem	Doug Cook	Dem
13th	G. Kyser Leonard †	Dem	Robert Weaver	Dem
14th	Walter C. Givhan	Dem	Walter C. Givhan	Dem
15th	W. G. McCarley †	Dem	Obee J. Littleton	Dem
16th	Tom Radney	Dem	Robert H. Wilder	Dem
17th	Bo Torbert †	Dem	Don Horne	Dem
18th	Pat Lindsey	Dem	Pat Lindsey	Dem
19th	Roland Cooper	Dem	Roland Cooper	Dem
20th	Alton Turner †	Dem	Crum Foshee	Dem
21st p. 1	Junie Pierce	Dem	Junie Pierce	Dem
21st p. 2	O. J. Goodwyn	Dem	Tom Jones	Dem
22nd	W. Ray Lolley‡	Dem	L. L. Dozier	Dem
23rd	James S. Clark	Dem	James S. Clark	Dem
24th p. 1	L. W. Noonan	Dem	L. W. Noonan	Dem
24th p. 2	Pierre Pelham	Dem	Pierre Pelham	Dem
24th p. 3	William McDermott	Dem	Robert W. Edington	Dem
25th	J. Ernest Jackon †	Dem	Dick Owen Jr.	Dem
26th	Jim Adams †	Dem	Larry Register	Dem

== Incumbents ==
=== Won re-election ===
The following incumbent senators sought and won re-election:

- District 1: Stewart O'Bannon
- District 2: Bob Harris
- District 7: Aubrey Carr
- District 10: Jimmy Branyon
- District 12, place 1: Pat Vacca
- District 12, place 3: John Hawkins
- District 12, place 4: Richard Dominick
- District 12, place 5: George L. Bailes
- District 12, place 6: Eddie H. Gilmore
- District 14: Walter C. Givhan
- District 18: Pat Lindsey
- District 19: Roland Cooper
- District 21, place 1: Junie Pierce
- District 23: James S. Clark
- District 24, place 1: L. W. Noonan
- District 24, place 2: Pierre Pelham

=== Eliminated in primary ===
The following incumbent senators were defeated at their respective Democratic primary:

- District 4: Dan Stone lost re-nomination to Kenneth Hammond.
- District 9: Woodrow lost re-nomination to Albea Fred Lybrand.
- District 12, place 2: Leland Childs (R–Jefferson) ran for re-election as a Democrat, but lost the nomination to Tom King.
- District 22: W. Ray Lolley lost re-nomination to L. L. Dozier.

=== Did not seek re-election ===
The following incumbent senators did not seek re-election:

- District 3: Jack Giles (D–Madison) ran unsuccessfully for lieutenant governor.
- District 5: Emmet Oden (D–Franklin) retired.
- District 6: Fred Folsom (D–Cullman) retired.
- District 8: Ollie Nabors (D–Etowah) retired.
- District 11: E. W. Skidmore (D–Tuscaloosa) retired.
- District 12, place 7: Hugh Morrow (D–Jefferson) ran unsuccessfully for lieutenant governor.
- District 13: G. Kyser Leonard (D–Talladega) was elected probate judge of Talladega County.
- District 15: W. G. McCarley (D–Autauga) ran unsuccessfully for Place No. 2 on the Alabama Public Service Commission.
- District 16: Tom Radney (D–Tallapoosa) ran unsuccessfully for lieutenant governor.
- District 17: Bo Torbert (D–Lee) retired.
- District 20: Alton Turner (D–Crenshaw) retired.
- District 21, place 2: President pro tempore O. J. Goodwyn (D–Montgomery) ran unsuccessfully for lieutenant governor.
- District 24, place 3: William McDermott (D–Mobile) retired.
- District 25: J. Ernest Jackon (D–Escambia) ran unsuccessfully for an Alabama House of Representatives seat in Escambia County.
- District 26: Jim Adams (D–Houston) retired.

== General election results ==
District	Democratic			National Democratic			Others			Total		
District	Candidate	Votes	%	Candidate	Votes	%	Candidate	Votes	%	Votes	Maj.	Mrg.
2nd	Bob Harris (inc.)	18,235	95.10%	Tom King	940	4.90%	—	—	—	19,175	+17,295	+90.20%
7th	Aubrey Carr (inc.)	19,184	94.98%	Lynn Ridgeway	1,014	5.02%	—	—	—	20,198	+18,170	+89.96%
9th	Fred Ray Lybrand	14,599	77.13%	—	—	—	Robert Simmons Jr. (Rep.)	4,329	22.87%	18,928	+10,270	+54.26%
10th	Jimmy Branyon (inc.)	17,989	76.62	Rev. H. Western	5,490	23.38%	—	—	—	23,479	+12,499	+53.23%
12th p. 1	Pat Vacca (inc.)	93,826	74.39%	John Billingsley	25,917	20.55%	William Mori (Con.)	6,380	5.06%	126,123	+67,909	+53.84%
12th p. 2	Tom King	91,650	72.30%	T. L. Crowell	24,001	18.93%	Lionel Ledbetter (Con.)	11,104	8.76%	126,755	+67,649	+53.37%
12th p. 3	John Hawkins (inc.)	98,577	79.56%	Herbert Johnson	22,448	18.12	Virginia Davis (Whi.)	2,877	2.32%	123,902	+76,129	+61.44%
12th p. 4	Richard Dominick (inc.)	90,759	72.56%	William. M. Pruitt	23,062	18.44%	William L. Gann (Con.)	11,255	9.00%	125,076	+67,697	+54.12%
12th p. 5	George L. Bailes (inc.)	87,568	68.52%	Georgia Price	23,816	18.64%	2 others (Note: Don Watts (AIP): 12,430, 9.73%; Jim McLendon (Con.): 3,982, 3.12%)	16,412	12.85%	127,796	+63,752	+49.89%
12th p. 6	Eddie H. Gilmore (inc.)	96,054	77.00%	Charles F. Williams	23,160	18.57%	Homer Sanders (Con.)	5,534	4.44%	124,748	+72,894	+58.43%
12th p. 7	Doug Cook	95,265	76.25%	Emory. L. Whittaker	24,424	19.55%	Wesley Jacobs (Con.)	5,242	4.20%	124,931	+70,841	+56.70%
14th	Walter C. Givhan (inc.)	16,247	81.30%	L. L. Anderson	3,736	18.70%	Carl Morgan (write-in)	1	0.01%	19,983	+12,511	+62.61%
16th	Robert H. Wilder	6,290	84.17%	—	—	—	Bill Lacy (Con.)	1,183	15.83%	7,473	+5,107	+68.34%
18th	Pat Lindsay (inc.)	14,533	58.13%	O. B. Wilson	7,328	29.31%	E. T. Rolison Jr. (Rep.)	3,140	12.56%	25,001	+7,205	+28.82%
19th	Roland Cooper (inc.)	17,120	83.14%	Damon Kiel	3,472	16.86%	—	—	—	20,592	+13,648	+66.28%
21st p. 2	Tom Jones	27,766	95.35%	—	—	—	Virgil Chrane (Con.)	1,355	4.65%	29,121	+26,411	+90.69%
23rd	James S. Clark (inc.)	12,751	93.21%	—	—	—	Zeke Calhoun (AIP)	929	6.79%	13,680	+11,822	+86.42%
24th p. 3	Robert W. Edington	48,186	90.39%	—	—	—	W. C. Boykin (Con.)	5,123	9.61%	53,309	+43,063	+80.78%
Source: 1975 Alabama Official and Statistical Register (p. 215–217)

=== Elected without opposition ===
The following candidates were the only candidates to file for their district's general election:

- District 1: Stewart O'Bannon (inc.) received 19,448 votes.
- District 3: Gene McLain received 28,832 votes.
- District 4: Kenneth Hammond received 16,839 votes. 1 write-in vote was recorded.
- District 5: Joe Fine received 17,738 votes.
- District 6: Bob Wilson received 24,163 votes. 2 write-in votes were recorded.
- District 8: Richard Malone received 15,879 votes.
- District 11: Richard Shelby received 18,511 votes.
- District 13: Robert Weaver received 18,059 votes.
- District 15: Obie J. Littleton received 18,356 votes.
- District 17: Don Horne received 15,133 votes.
- District 20: Crum Foshee received 16,363 votes.
- District 21, place 1: Junie Pierce (inc.) received 26,834 votes.
- District 22: L. L. Dozier received 18,509 votes. 2 write-in votes were recorded.
- District 24, place 1: L. W. Noonan received 40,020 votes.
- District 24, place 2: Pierre Pelham (inc.) received 41,277 votes.
- District 25: Dick Owen received 16,215 votes. 1 write-in vote was recorded.
- District 26: Larry Register received 19,497 votes.

== Democratic primary results ==
Five Black Americans ran in the state senate primaries. Henry Parker, Larry F. Haygood and Austin Sumbry were eliminated in the first round in May, while L. H. Pitts and L. L. Anderson advanced to the June runoff. Neither won the Democratic nomination.

=== Runoff results by district ===
Three incumbent senators won re-nomination in the runoff, while three lost re-nomination. Robert H. Wilder initially faced a runoff in District 16 against L. L. Still, but Still declined to participate in the runoff, allowing Wilder to advance to the general election.

Candidates in boldface advanced to the general election. An asterisk (*) denotes a runoff winner who was the runner-up in the first round.

District	Winner			Loser			Total		
District	Candidate	Votes	%	Candidate	Votes	%	Votes	Maj.	Mrg.
1st	**Stewart O'Bannon (inc.)**	16,639	50.27%	Murry Beasley	16,459	49.73%	33,098	+180	+0.54%
4th	**Kenneth Hammond**	16,999	58.23%	Dan Stone (inc.)	12,193	41.77%	29,192	+4,806	+16.46%
6th	**Robert Wilson**	21,088	54.13%	Hubert Taylor	17,871	45.87%	38,959	+3,217	+8.26%
8th	**Richard Malone***	14,922	50.55%	Gary Burns	14,599	49.45%	29,521	+323	+1.09%
9th	**Fred Lybrand**	13,878	50.49%	Woodrow Albea (inc.)	13,607	49.51%	27,485	+271	+0.99%
12th p. 1	**Pat Vacca (inc.)**	98,051	56.91%	Lucius Pitts	74,234	43.09%	172,285	+23,817	+13.82%
12th p. 2	**Tom King**	94,455	57.01%	Leland Childs (inc.)	71,240	42.99%	165,695	+23,215	+14.01%
13th	**Robert Weaver**	13,440	62.97%	Mallory Hammonds	7,903	37.03%	21,343	+5,537	+25.94%
14th	**Walter C. Givhan (inc.)**	14,560	65.56%	L. L. Anderson	7,650	34.44%	22,210	+6,910	+31.11%
21st p. 2	**W. Tom Jones***	23,423	53.13%	James W. Cameron	20,662	46.87%	44,085	+2,761	+6.26%
22nd	**L. L. Dozier***	15,607	51.63%	Neil Metcalf	14,619	48.37%	30,226	+988	+3.27%
26th	**Larry Register***	15,489	55.62%	William Matthews	12,358	44.38%	27,847	+3,131	+11.24%
Source: The Huntsville Times

=== First round results by district ===
Candidates in boldface advanced to either the general election or a runoff, first-place winners with an asterisk (*) did not face a runoff.

District	First place			Runners-up			Others			Total			Ref.
District	Candidate	Votes	%	Candidate	Votes	%	Candidate	Votes	%	Votes	Maj.	Mrg.	Ref.
1st	**Stewart O'Bannon (inc.)**	6,025	39.53%	**Bob Broadfoot**	**3,586**	**23.53%**	2 others (Note: James D. Alexander: 2,824, 18.53%; Murray W. Beasley: 2,808, 18.42%)	5,632	36.95%	15,243	+2,439	+16.00%	
3rd	**Gene McLain***	22,548	60.39%	Harry L. Pennington	14,790	39.61%	—	—	—	37,338	+7,758	+20.78%	
4th	**Kenneth Hammond**	11,188	42.69%	**Dan Stone (inc.)**	**7,965**	**30.39%**	Bernard Cabiness	7,053	26.91%	26,206	+3,223	+12.30%	
5th	**Joe Fine***	4,162	58.50%	Thomas E. Snoddy	1,261	17.73%	3 others (Note: Wayne Gentry: 897, 12.61%; Frank Murray: 611, 8.59%; Edsel F. Moore: 183, 2.57%)	1,691	23.77%	7,114	+2,901	+40.78%	
6th	**Hubert Taylor**	16,864	46.36%	**Robert T. Wilson**	**15,858**	**43.59%**	Leonard Wilson	3,658	10.05%	36,380	+1,006	+2.77%	
7th	**Aubrey J. Carr (inc.)***	10,905	52.58%	John W. Starnes	9,835	47.42%	—	—	—	20,740	+1,070	+5.16%	
8th	**Gary F. Burns**	8,431	44.00%	**Richard Malone**	**7,275**	**37.96%**	Birch Anderson	3,457	18.04%	19,163	+1,156	+6.03%	
9th	**Fred Lybrand**	10,448	45.07%	**Woodrow Albea (inc.)**	**8,861**	**38.22%**	L. S. Suggs	3,875	16.71%	23,184	+1,587	+6.85%	
11th	**Richard C. Shelby***	14,006	59.55%	Olin W. Zeanah	9,513	40.45%	—	—	—	23,519	+4,493	+19.10%	
12th p. 1	**Paul Vacca (inc.)**	73,296	49.90%	**Lucius H. Pitts**	**57,906**	**39.42%**	M. L. Roton	15,693	10.68%	146,895	+15,390	+10.48%	
12th p. 2	**Tom King**	66,782	47.06%	**Leland Childs (inc.)**	**62,973**	**44.37%**	Curtis Belcher	12,166	8.57%	141,921	+3,809	+2.68%	
12th p. 4	**Richard Dominick (inc.)***	67,287	51.21%	Jack H. Harrison	57,952	44.10%	Robert S. Watters	6,157	4.69%	131,396	+9,335	+7.10%	
12th p. 5	**George L. Bailes (inc.)***	70,391	51.12%	Don Watts	50,852	36.93%	H. L. Parker	16,442	11.94%	137,685	+19,539	+14.19%	
12th p. 7	**Doug Cook***	85,516	66.36%	Louis Moore	31,810	24.68%	Sam L. Chestnut	11,540	8.96%	128,866	+53,706	+41.68%	
13th	**Robert Weaver**	13,752	49.80%	**Mallory W. Hammonds**	**9,035**	**32.72%**	Sam Venable	4,829	17.49%	27,616	+4,717	+17.08%	
14th	**Walter C. Givhan (inc.)**	6,865	44.22%	**Louis Lloyd Anderson**	**4,820**	**31.05%**	Carl C. Morgan	3,839	24.73%	15,524	+2,045	+13.17%	
15th	**Obie Littleton***	12,786	59.52%	Alex Hayes	6,622	30.82%	H. A. Rubin	2,075	9.66%	21,483	+6,164	+28.69%	
16th	**Robert H. Wilder**	9,285	35.26%	**L. L. Still**	**5,523**	**20.97%**	3 others (Note: Larry F. Haygood: 4,997, 18.97%; W. C. Forehand: 4,903, 18.62%; Oscar David Cook: 1,627, 6.18%)	11,527	43.77%	26,335	+3,762	+14.29%	
17th	**Don Horne***	6,011	66.24%	Charles E. Fuller	3,063	33.76%	—	—	—	9,074	+2,948	+32.49%	
19th	**Roland Cooper (inc.)***	7,874	58.16%	Gene Garrett	4,443	32.82%	Rob Andress	1,222	9.03%	13,539	+3,431	+25.34%	
20th	**E. C. Foshee***	15,477	56.88%	Fletcher Jones	11,735	43.12%	—	—	—	27,212	+3,742	+13.75%	
21st p. 1	**Junie Pierce (inc.)***	19,898	56.36%	J. C. Snowden	12,155	34.43%	James V. Scoma	3,251	9.21%	35,304	+7,743	+21.93%	
21st p. 2	**James W. Cameron**	11,975	32.74%	**W. Tom Jones**	**11,666**	**31.89%**	2 others (Note: Calvin Whitesell: 10,266, 28.06%; Robert Muncaster: 2,673, 7.31%)	12,939	35.37%	36,580	+309	+0.84%	
22nd	**Neil Metcalf**	7,522	34.50%	**L. L. Dozier**	**6,269**	**28.75%**	2 others (Note: W. Ray Lolley (inc.): 4,131, 18.95%; John B. Crawley: 3,880, 17.80%)	8,011	36.74%	21,802	+1,253	+5.75%	
23rd	**James S. Clark (inc.)***	2,585	75.70%	Austin Sumbry	830	24.30%	—	—	—	3,415	+1,755	+51.39%	
24th p. 3	**Robert S. Edington***	32,256	55.33%	Rassie G. Smith	26,045	44.67%	—	—	—	58,301	+6,211	+10.65%	
26th	**William Matthews**	9,660	43.14%	**Larry Register**	**8,109**	**36.21%**	2 others (Note: Charles H. Davis: 2,334, 10.42%; George L. Keel: 2,290, 10.23%)	4,624	20.65%	22,393	+1,551	+6.93%	

=== Nominated without opposition ===
The following candidates were the only candidates to file for their district's Democratic primary, which automatically gave them the nomination:

- District 2: Bob Harris (inc.)
- District 10: Jimmy Branyon (inc.)
- District 12, place 3: John Hawkins (inc.)
- District 12, place 6: Eddie H. Gilmore (inc.)
- District 18: Pat Lindsey (inc.)
- District 24, place 1: L. W. Noonan
- District 24, place 2: Pierre Pelham (inc.)
- District 25: Dick Owen originally faced opposition in the Democratic primary, but his opponents withdrew.

== Republican convention ==
On July 17–18, the Republican state convention nominated three candidates for state senate:

- District 9: Robert Simmons Jr.
- District 17: Jerry Cook
- District 18: E. T. Rolison Jr.

Cook, however, had withdrawn as a candidate a few days before the convention. An attempt was made to get Democratic incumbent Bo Torbert to run as a Republican, he rejected the offer.

== See also ==
- 1970 Alabama gubernatorial election
- List of Alabama state legislatures
