= 1970 Alabama lieutenant gubernatorial election =

- November 3, 1970
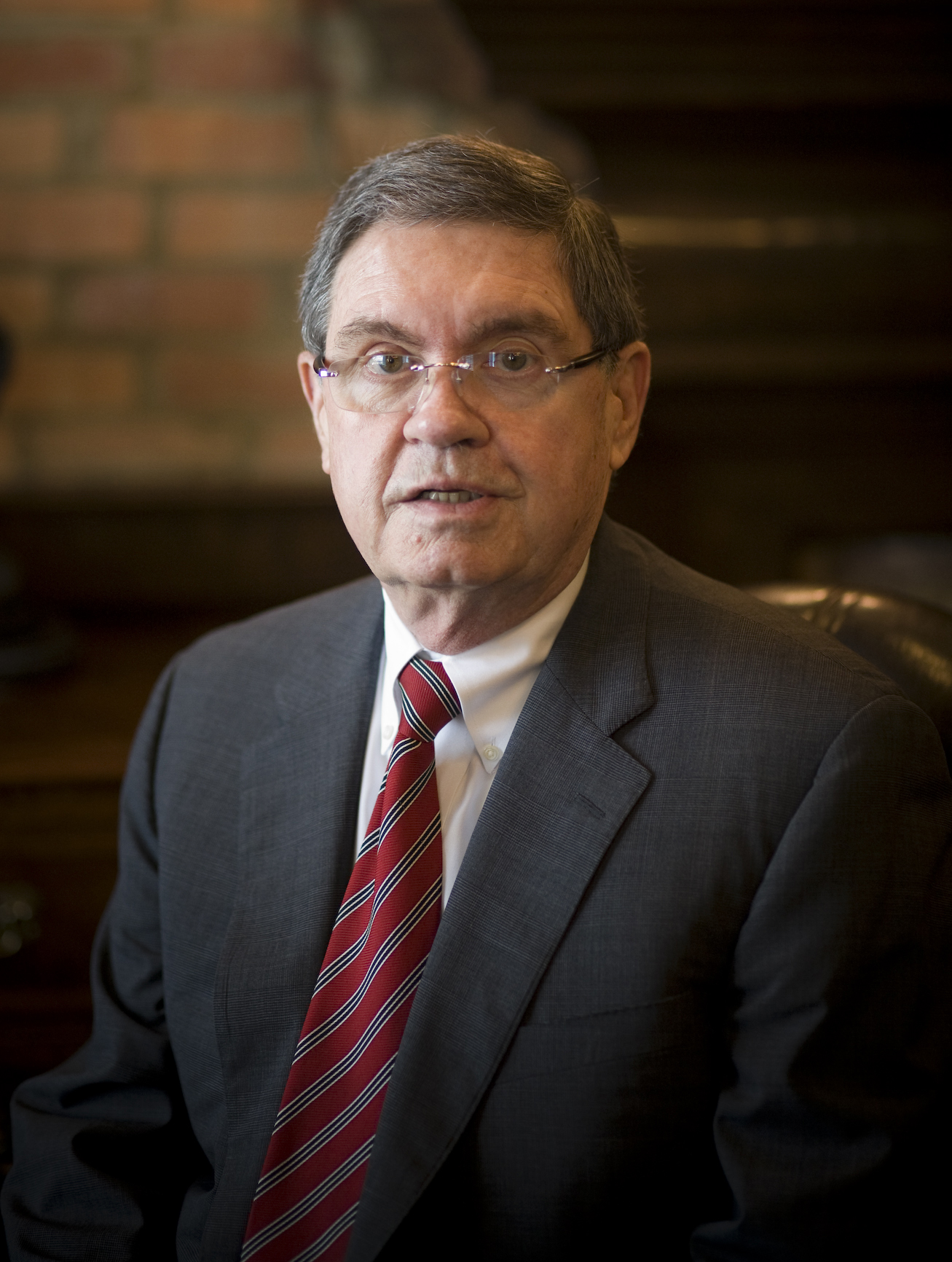

Nominee	Jere Beasley	Bob French	Isaiah Hayes
Party	Democratic	Republican	NDPA
Popular vote	589,618	126,506	92,176
Percentage	71.44%	15.33%	11.17%
Lieutenant Governor before election
Vacant
Elected Lieutenant Governor
Jere Beasley
Democratic

The 1970 Alabama lieutenant gubernatorial election was held on November 3, 1970, in order to elect the lieutenant governor of Alabama. Democratic nominee Jere Beasley defeated Republican nominee Bob French, National Democratic nominee Isaiah Hayes, Prohibition nominee D. N. Stephenson and Independent candidate John G. Crommelin.

== Democratic primary ==
In the Democratic primary election, candidate Jere Beasley received a plurality of the votes (29.03%), thus advancing to a runoff against runner-up Hugh Morrow. Beasley won the runoff with 57.78% and thus became the Democratic nominee for lieutenant governor.

=== First Round ===
1970 Democratic lieutenant gubernatorial primary
Party	Candidate	Votes	%
Democratic	Jere Beasley	256,081	29.03%
Democratic	Hugh Morrow	185,333	21.01%
Democratic	Tom Radney	163,462	18.53%
Democratic	Joe Money	100,131	11.35%
Democratic	Jack Giles	81,789	9.27%
Democratic	Joe Goodwyn	75,085	8.51%
Democratic	James Gullate	10,627	1.21%
Democratic	Jay Thomas	9,631	1.09%
Total votes		882,139	100.00%

=== Runoff ===
1970 Democratic lieutenant gubernatorial runoff
Party	Candidate	Votes	%
Democratic	Jere Beasley	572,258	57.78%
Democratic	Hugh Morrow	418,228	42.22%
Total votes		990,486	100.00%

== General election ==
On election day, November 3, 1970, Democratic nominee Jere Beasley won the election by a margin of 463,112 votes against his foremost opponent Republican nominee Bob French, thereby retaining Democratic control over the office of lieutenant governor. Beasley was sworn in as the 22nd lieutenant governor of Alabama on January 19, 1971.

=== Results ===
Alabama lieutenant gubernatorial election, 1970
Party	Candidate	Votes	%
Democratic	Jere Beasley	589,618	71.44
Republican	Bob French	126,506	15.33
NDPA	Isaiah Hayes	92,176	11.17
Prohibition	D. N. Stephenson	9,374	1.14
Independent	John G. Crommelin	7,678	0.92
Total votes		825,352	100.00
Democratic hold			
