= Hugh Morrow =

Hugh Morrow may refer to:

- Hugh Morrow (footballer) (1930–2020), English footballer and manager
- Hugh Morrow (businessman) (1873–1960), American lawyer, businessman, and politician
- Hugh Morrow III (1931–1975), American politician in Alabama
