= 1966 Alabama Senate election =

- November 8, 1966

All 35 seats in the Alabama State Senate 18 seats needed for a majority
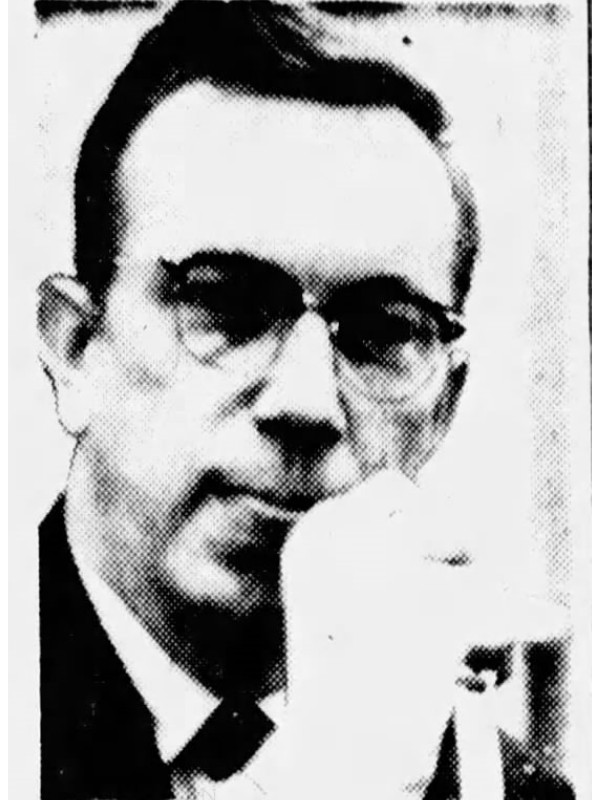

	Majority party	Minority party
Leader	George C. Hawkins (did not stand)	—
Party	Democratic	Republican
Leader since	January 8, 1963	—
Leader's seat	8th–Etowah Co. (Note: 6th district until the 1965 reapportionment)	—
Last election	35 seats, 90.2%	0 seats, 9.8%
Seats won	34	1
Seat change	▼1	▲1
Popular vote	1,073,280	550,480
Percentage	65.31%	33.50%
- Democratic win Republican win Democratic: 50–60% 60–70% 70–80% 80–90% Unopposed; Republican: 50–60%
President pro tempore before election
George C. Hawkins
Democratic
Elected President pro tempore
O. J. Goodwyn
Democratic

The 1966 Alabama Senate election took place on Tuesday, November 8, 1966, to elect 35 representatives to serve four-year terms in the Alabama Senate. The sole non-Democrat to win a seat was conservative Republican Leland Childs of Jefferson County. Childs was the first Republican state senator elected in decades.

The Democratic primaries were held on May 3 with runoffs on May 31, which candidates had until March 1 to qualify for. The Republican Party did not hold primaries for state office, instead opting to nominate by party convention. The Republican convention took place in Montgomery on July 30.

This was the first Alabama Senate election held after Alabama's $1.50 poll tax was ruled illegal in March 1966 and the prohibition of literacy tests by the Voting Rights Act of 1965. This was also the first Senate election held after the reapportionment of 1965, which created multi-member senate districts for the first time.

On January 10, 1967, O. J. Goodwyn of Montgomery County was unanimously elected Senate president pro tempore.

== Summary ==
Party	Candidates			Seats		
Party	Num.	Vote	%	Before	Won	+/–
Democratic	35	1,073,280	65.31%	35	34	▼1
Republican	26	550,480	33.50%	0	1	▲1
Independents	1	6,885	0.42%	0	0	Steady
TPFA	1	6,365	0.39%	0	0	Steady
Conservative	1	6,317	0.38%	0	0	Steady
Total	64	1,643,327	100%	35	35	Steady

== Background ==
Apportionment of the Alabama Senate, in use from 1965 to 1973: Single-member: 1-county 2-county 3-county 4-county 5-county (District 10) / Multi-member: 2-member (21st; Montgomery) 3-member (24th; Mobile) 7-member (12th; Jefferson)

In September 1965, the Senate was reapportioned to have 26 districts, three of which were multi-member districts. District 12, Jefferson County, had seven seats; District 24, Mobile, three; District 21, Montgomery, two. These three counties elected senators at-large, with candidates running for designated places. Four counties received one seat each, and the remaining 19 districts were divided up into multi-county districts containing between two and five counties.

Before this election, the Alabama Senate had 35 single-member districts, based entirely on existing county lines. No county or district could have more than one member, no matter how large. This led to a massive population disparity that largely benefited rural areas of Alabama: The Jefferson County district, containing 634,864 people as of the 1960 United States census, was 20 times more populated than the smallest district, Bibb–Perry, with only 31,715 people.

=== Deviation ===
The table below will show the most-populated and least-populated senate districts under the 1962 and 1965 apportionment plans. The population of Alabama at the 1960 census was 3,266,740, with an ideal 93,335 people under a 35-district plan.

Year	District	Population	% of ideal	Diff.
1962	Jefferson	634,864	680.20%	20.01
1962	Bibb–Perry	31,715	33.98%	20.01
1965	Madison	117,348	125.73%	1.46
1965	Choctaw–Marengo–Sumter–Washington	80,381	86.12%	1.46

== Incumbents ==
=== Won re-election ===
Only five incumbent senators were elected to the 1967–1970 legislature.

- Jimmy Clark (Democratic) of Barbour won re-election.
- Roland Cooper (Democratic) of Wilcox won re-election.
- Walter C. Givhan (Democratic) of Dallas won re-election.
- Ray Lolley (Democratic) of Coffee won re-election.
- Emmett Oden (Democratic) of Franklin won re-election.

=== Eliminated in primary ===
- L. D. Bentley (Democratic) of Blount lost renomination in the runoff to Aubrey Carr.
- Clayton Carter (Democratic) of Marshall lost renomination to Aubrey Carr.
- E. O. Eddins (Democratic) of Marengo lost renomination to William Lindsey.
- Kenneth Hammond (Democratic) of DeKalb lost renomination in the runoff to Dan Stone.
- Jimmy McDow (Democratic) of Autauga lost renomination in the runoff to W. G. McCarley.
- B. G. Robison (Democratic) of Pickens lost renomination to Jimmy Branyon.
- H. B. Taylor (Democratic) of Butler lost renomination to Alton Turner.
- A. C. Shelton (Democratic) of Calhoun withdrew during the runoff, giving the nomination to Woodrow Albea.

=== Did not seek re-election ===
- Charles Adams (Democratic) of Houston did not run for re-election.
- Mutt Allen (Democratic) of Cullman did not run for re-election.
- L. W. Brannan (Democratic) of Baldwin ran for state house.
- Larry Dumas (Democratic) of Jefferson did not run for re-election.
- Albert Evans (Democratic) of Choctaw did not run for re-election.
- Bob Gilchrist (Democratic) of Morgan unsuccessfully ran for governor.
- George Hawkins (Democratic) of Etowah did not run for re-election.
- Ernest C. Hornsby (Democratic) of Tallapoosa did not run for re-election.
- Ed Horton (Democratic) of Limestone did not run for re-election.
- H. P. James (Democratic) of Bibb did not run for re-election.
- Julian Lowe (Democratic) of Randolph did not run for re-election.
- Neil Metcalf (Democratic) of Geneva unsuccessfully ran for lieutenant governor.
- Bill McCain (Democratic) of Tuscaloosa did not run for re-election.
- Charles Montgomery (Democratic) of Greene did not run for re-election.
- Pete Mathews (Democratic) of Clay successfully ran for state house.
- Bill Nichols (Democratic) of ran successfully for U.S. House from the 4th congressional district.
- Ed Reynolds (Democratic) of Macon did not run for re-election.
- Roscoe Roberts (Democratic) of Madison did not run for re-election.
- Vaughan Hill Robison (Democratic) of Montgomery did not run for re-election.
- Joe Smith (Democratic) of Russell did not run for re-election.
- John M. Tyson (Democratic) of Mobile unsuccessfully ran for lieutenant governor.
- Bob Wilson (Democratic) of Walker did not run for re-election.

== General election results ==
District	Democratic			Republican			Others			Total		
District	Candidate	Votes	%	Candidate	Votes	%	Candidate	Votes	%	Votes	Maj.	Mrg.
1st	Stewart O'Bannon	17,981	71.58%	Kenn Buttram	7,139	28.42%	—	—	—	25,120	+10,842	+43.16%
3rd	Jack Giles	21,040	62.12%	Wayne Robinson	12,828	37.88%	—	—	—	33,868	+8,212	+24.25%
5th	W. Emmet Oden	14,261	55.09%	Jimmy Wilson	11,624	44.91%	—	—	—	25,885	+2,637	+10.19%
6th	Fred C. Folsom	20,800	67.73%	Claude Gholston	9,908	32.27%	—	—	—	30,708	+10,892	+35.47%
7th	Aubrey Carr	17,744	65.38%	J. D. Lay	9,394	34.62%	—	—	—	27,138	+8,350	+30.77%
8th	Ollie Nabors	16,963	71.49%	Owen Leach	6,766	28.51%	—	—	—	23,729	+10,197	+42.97%
9th	Woodrow Albea	12,506	65.47%	George Deyo	6,597	34.53%	—	—	—	19,103	+5,909	+30.93%
10th	James Branyon	13,824	81.70%	James Herren	3,097	18.30%	—	—	—	16,921	+10,727	+63.39%
11th	E. W. Skidmore	12,741	60.94%	Maxwell Peters	8,165	39.06%	—	—	—	20,906	+4,576	+21.89%
12th p. 1	Hugh Morrow	90,582	67.52%	Frank Lankford	43,579	32.48%	—	—	—	134,161	+47,003	+35.03%
12th p. 2	Foster Etheredge	65,333	48.97%	Leland Childs	68,072	51.03%	—	—	—	133,405	−2,739	−2.05%
12th p. 3	John Hawkins	86,021	64.43%	Malcolm Bethea	47,497	35.57%	—	—	—	133,518	+38,524	+28.85%
12th p. 4	Richard Dominick	72,612	55.61%	Norman Brown	57,963	44.39%	—	—	—	130,575	+14,649	+11.22%
12th p. 5	George Bailes	70,952	53.73%	Bill Bailey	61,098	46.27%	—	—	—	132,050	+9,854	+7.46%
12th p. 6	Eddie Gilmore	88,191	66.68%	C. P. Malone	44,062	33.32%	—	—	—	132,253	+44,129	+33.37%
12th p. 7	Pat Vacca	88,033	66.99%	James Price	43,388	33.01%	—	—	—	131,421	+44,645	+33.97%
13th	G. Kyser Leonard	15,144	72.37%	Travis McCaig	5,782	27.63%	—	—	—	20,926	+9,362	+44.74%
15th	W. G. McCarley	15,724	65.36%	James N. Smith	8,334	34.64%	—	—	—	24,058	+7,390	+30.72%
16th	Tom Radney	16,091	73.45%	J. B. Ruffin	5,815	26.55%	—	—	—	21,906	+10,276	+46.91%
20th	Alton Turner	12,729	52.57%	Harold Albritten	4,599	18.99%	Fletcher Jones (Ind.)	6,885	28.44%	24,213	+5,844	+24.14%
21st p. 1	Junie Pierce	21,511	62.73%	Robert E. Varner	12,781	37.27%	—	—	—	34,292	+8,730	+25.46%
21st p. 2	O. J. Goodwyn	20,245	57.59%	J. Paul Lowery	14,909	42.41%	—	—	—	35,154	+5,336	+15.18%
24th p. 2	Pierre Pelham	38,430	61.76%	Bert Nettles	23,795	38.24%	—	—	—	62,225	+14,635	+23.52%
24th p. 3	William McDermott	34,555	55.08%	John H. Friend	21,868	34.85%	Phil Holmes (Con.)	6,317	10.07%	62,740	+12,687	+20.22%
25th	Ernest Jackson	12,377	57.60%	Robin Swift	9,111	42.40%	—	—	—	21,488	+3,266	+15.20%
26th	J. L. Adams	11,815	57.67%	Edward Lisenby	2,309	11.27%	William Matthews (TPFA)	6,365	31.07%	20,489	+5,450	+26.60%
Source: Alabama Official and Statistical Register, 1967 (p. 637–642)

=== Elected without opposition ===
Every candidate elected with no opponents was a Democrat.

- District 2: Bob Harris received 17,259 votes.
- District 4: Dan Stone received 16,953 votes.
- District 14: Walter C. Givhan received 18,847 votes.
- District 17: C. C. Torbert Jr. received 14,880 votes.
- District 18: Bill Lindsey received 9,400 votes.
- District 19: Roland Cooper received 14,917 votes.
- District 22: Ray Lolley received 16,998 votes.
- District 23: Jimmy Clark received 12,384 votes.
- District 24, place 1: Myland R. Engel received 43,437 votes.

== Democratic primary results ==
Of the 13 incumbent state senators who ran for re-election, only five received re-nomination in the Democratic primary.

One Black American ran for a senate seat, Lonnie Brown in District 19.

=== Runoff results by district ===
Candidates in boldface advanced to the general election. An asterisk (*) denotes a runoff winner who trailed in the first round.

District	Winner			Loser			Total		
District	Candidate	Votes	%	Candidate	Votes	%	Votes	Maj.	Mrg.
1st	**Stewart O'Bannon**	12,861	58.38%	Buddy Hannah	9,169	41.62%	22,030	+3,692	+16.76%
2nd	**Bob Harris**	9,404	57.29%	Daren Easter	7,012	42.71%	16,416	+2,392	+14.57%
4th	**Dan Stone**	10,469	61.44%	Kenneth Hammond (inc.)	6,571	38.56%	17,040	+3,898	+22.88%
6th	**Fred Folsom***	11,316	51.91%	Bob Gunn	10,483	48.09%	21,799	+833	+3.82%
7th	**Aubrey Carr**	9,724	58.95%	L. D. Bentley (inc.)	6,772	41.05%	16,496	+2,952	+17.90%
12th p. 2	**Buck Etheredge**	53,089	59.56%	John Golden	36,051	40.44%	89,140	+17,038	+19.11%
15th	**W. G. McCarley**	7,221	59.01%	Jimmy McDow (inc.)	5,016	40.99%	12,237	+2,205	+18.02%
16th	**Tom Radney**	12,287	52.51%	Runt O'Daniel	11,114	47.49%	23,401	+1,173	+5.01%
19th	**Roland Cooper (inc.)**	15,352	78.25%	Lonnie L. Brown	4,267	21.75%	19,619	+11,085	+56.50%
Source: Alabama Official and Statistical Register, 1967 (p. 599–607)

Additionally, runoffs in District 9 and District 22 were planned, but were canceled after candidates withdrew from their races. Both withdrawals were from candidates who placed second in the first round.

- District 9: Woodrow Albea advanced after A. C. Shelton (inc.) withdrew.
- District 22: Ray Lolley (inc.) advanced after L. L. Dozier withdrew.

=== First round results by district ===
Candidates in boldface advanced to either the general election or a runoff, first-place winners with an asterisk (*) did not face a runoff.

District	First place			Runners-up			Others			Total		
District	Candidate	Votes	%	Candidate	Votes	%	Candidate	Votes	%	Votes	Maj.	Mrg.
1st	**Stewart O'Bannon**	6,394	24.17%	**Buddy Hannah**	**6,222**	**23.52%**	3 others (Note: George C. Copeland: 6,062 votes, 22.92%; Robert H. Broadfoot: 5,353 votes, 20.24%; Louis A. Vinson: 2,422 votes, 9.16%)	13,837	52.31%	26,453	+172	+0.65%
2nd	**Bob Harris**	8,485	42.95%	**Daren Easter**	**5,331**	**26.99%**	2 others (Note: Norman C. Albright: 4,082 votes, 20.66%; Carl B. Sides: 1,856 votes, 9.40%)	5,938	30.06%	19,754	+3,154	+15.97%
3rd	**Jack Giles***	17,123	71.15%	Eugene J. Patterson	6,944	28.85%	—	—	—	24,067	+10,179	+42.29%
4th	**Dan Stone**	8,715	38.58%	**Kenneth Hammond (inc.)**	**7,769**	**34.39%**	Lawrence Sebring	6,106	27.03%	22,590	+946	+4.19%
5th	**Emmett Oden (inc.)***	13,122	54.19%	U. R. Jarnigan	11,093	45.81%	—	—	—	24,215	+2,029	+8.38%
6th	**Bob Gunn**	11,545	42.23%	**Fred C. Folsom**	**9,411**	**34.43%**	Finis St. John	6,381	23.34%	27,337	+2,134	+7.81%
7th	**Aubrey Carr**	7,445	28.15%	**L. D. Bentley Jr. (inc.)**	**6,378**	**24.12%**	3 others (Note: Roy H. Coshatt: 5,082 votes, 19.22 %; Clayton Carter (inc.): 4,249 votes, 16.07%; Clinton E. Moore: 3,294 votes, 12.45%)	12,625	47.74%	26,448	+1,067	+4.03%
8th	**Ollie W. Nabors***	16,880	69.91%	E. L. Roberts	7,267	30.09%	—	—	—	24,147	+9,613	+39.81%
9th	**Woodrow Albea**	8,898	43.25%	**A. C. Shelton (inc.)**	**5,845**	**28.41%**	2 others (Note: Catherine A. Whitehead: 3,110 votes, 15.12%; Elvin C. McCrary: 2,721 votes, 13.23%)	5,831	28.34%	20,574	+3,053	+14.84%
10th	**James Branyon***	11,344	56.73%	B. G. Robison (inc.)	8,653	43.27%	—	—	—	19,997	+2,691	+13.46%
11th	**E. W. Skidmore***	10,167	51.13%	James L. Frazier	6,248	31.42%	Joseph A. Colquitt	3,469	17.45%	19,884	+3,919	+19.71%
12th p. 2	**Buck Etheredge**	47,818	45.21%	**John Golden**	**39,712**	**37.55%**	Neal E. Hemphill	18,230	17.24%	105,760	+8,106	+7.66%
12th p. 3	**John Hawkins***	68,713	63.55%	Jerome A. Cooper	39,419	36.45%	—	—	—	108,132	+29,294	+27.09%
12th p. 4	**Richard Dominick***	60,715	61.56%	Louis Moore	37,919	38.44%	—	—	—	98,634	+22,796	+23.11%
12th p. 7	**Pat Vacca***	52,086	55.60%	John Lair	28,543	30.47%	Henry Dozier	13,052	13.93%	93,681	+23,543	+25.13%
14th	**Walter C. Givhan (inc.)***	16,534	69.17%	Dave Ellwanger	7,371	30.83%	—	—	—	23,905	+9,163	+38.33%
15th	**W. G. McCarley**	8,548	42.48%	**Jimmy McDow (inc.)**	**6,949**	**34.53%**	L. O. Goodwin	4,625	22.98%	20,122	+1,599	+7.95%
16th	**Tom Radney**	11,488	48.80%	**H. H. O'Daniel**	**7,548**	**32.06%**	G. Lanier	4,507	19.14%	23,543	+3,940	+16.74%
18th	**W. H. Lindsey***	14,327	60.02%	E. O. Eddins (inc.)	7,809	32.72%	Wallace P. Pruitt	1,733	7.26%	23,869	+6,518	+27.31%
19th	**Roland Cooper (inc.)**	11,218	46.09%	**Lonnie L. Brown**	**7,283**	**29.92%**	Maston M. Mims	5,838	23.99%	24,339	+3,935	+16.17%
20th	**Alton L. Turner***	17,090	69.83%	H. B. Taylor (inc.)	7,384	30.17%	—	—	—	24,474	+9,706	+39.66%
21st p. 2	**O. J. Goodwyn***	19,560	57.84%	Claud L. Walker	14,259	42.16%	—	—	—	33,819	+5,301	+15.67%
22nd	**W. Ray Lolley (inc.)**	11,540	49.00%	**L. L. Dozier**	**8,130**	**34.52%**	Bill Sandford	3,880	16.48%	23,550	+3,410	+14.48%
23rd	**Jimmy Clark (inc.)***	12,513	65.44%	J. E. Putnam	6,608	34.56%	—	—	—	19,121	+5,905	+30.88%
24th p. 2	**Pierre Pelham***	34,461	68.13%	Ralph A. Richard	16,118	31.87%	—	—	—	50,579	+18,343	+36.27%
26th	**Charles L. Woods**	9,459	46.46%	**J. L. Adams**	**7,185**	**35.29%**	2 others (Note: Nick Saad: 3,057 votes, 15.01%; Albert E. Saliba: 660 votes, 3.24%)	3,717	18.26%	20,361	+2,274	+11.17%
Source: Alabama Official and Statistical Register, 1967 (p. 570–575)

=== Nominated without opposition ===
The following candidates automatically won the Democratic nomination, as no opponent filed to run against them.

- District 12, place 1: Hugh Morrow
- District 12, place 5: George L. Bailes
- District 12, place 6: Eddie H. Gilmore
- District 13: G. Kyser Leonard
- District 17: C. C. Torbert Jr.
- District 21, place 1: Junie Pierce
- District 24, place 1: Mylan R. Engel
- District 24, place 3: William McDermott
- District 25: J. Ernest Jackson

== Republican convention ==
The Alabama Republican Party did not nominate candidates by partisan primary, instead choosing its nominees by party convention. The state GOP convention was held on July 30, 1966, at Montgomery's Garrett Coliseum, with county and local conventions occurring earlier. The state party initially expected to nominate a full slate of candidates for all 35 seats, but did not end up doing so. The following candidates were selected:

- District 1: Kenn Buttram
- District 3: Wayne Robinson
- District 5: Jimmy Wilson
- District 6: Claude Gholston
- District 7: J. D. Lay
- District 8: Owen Leach
- District 9: George Deyo
- District 10: James Herren
- District 11: Maxwell Peters
- District 12, place 1: Frank Lankford
- District 12, place 2: Leland Childs
- District 12, place 3: Malcolm Bethea
- District 12, place 4: Norman Brown
- District 12, place 5: Bill Bailey
- District 12, place 6: C. P. Malone
- District 12, place 7: James Price
- District 13: Travis McCaig
- District 15: James N. Smith
- District 16: J. B. Ruffin
- District 20: Harold Albritten
- District 21, place 1: Robert E. Varner
- District 21, place 2: J. Paul Lowery
- District 24, place 2: Bert Nettles
- District 24, place 3: John H. Friend
- District 25: Robin Swift
- District 26: Edward Lisenby

=== Jefferson County convention ===
The Jefferson County Republican convention was held on June 3, 1966. A full slate of House and Senate candidates were picked to oppose Democrats.

1966 Jefferson County Republican convention
Party	Candidate	Votes	%
Republican	Norman K. Brown	382	14.10%
Republican	Malcolm Bethea	381	14.06%
Republican	William Bailey	372	13.73%
Republican	Charles P. Malone	353	13.03%
Republican	James E. Price	353	13.03%
Republican	Leland Childs	269	9.93%
Republican	Frank E. Lankford	217	8.01%
Republican	Jack Callaway	206	7.60%
Republican	Sidney W. Smyer Jr.	124	4.58%
Republican	Grover S. McLeod	53	1.96%
Total votes		2,710	100.00%

== Third party and independent candidates ==
The newly-formed Conservative Party of Alabama held a party convention on Saturday, July 23, 1966, at the Whitley Hotel in Montgomery, Alabama. Only one state senate candidate, Phil Holmes in Mobile County's District 24, place 3, was nominated. The party's inaugural convention saw about 100 delegates attend. He came in third in the general election with 10% of the vote.

One candidate, William "Buddy" Matthews, ran under the "Third Party for America" banner in District 26 in Houston and Dale counties. He came in second in the general election with 31% of the vote, ahead of the Republican nominee.

In the four-county 20th district, Democratic state representative Fletcher Jones filed to run as an independent candidate after failing to qualify for the Democratic primary election. He came in second in the general election with 28% of the vote, ahead of the Republican nominee.

== See also ==
- 1966 United States Senate election in Alabama
- 1966 United States House of Representatives elections in Alabama
- 1966 Alabama gubernatorial election
- 1966 Alabama State Treasurer election
- 1966 Alabama Superintendent of Education election
