= Governor Beasley =

Governor Beasley may refer to:

- David Beasley (born 1957), 113th Governor of South Carolina
- Jere Beasley (born 1935), Acting Governor of Alabama
