= 1910 Alabama Senate election =

- November 8, 1910

35 seats in the Alabama State Senate 18 seats needed for a majority
	Majority party	Minority party
Leader	E. P. Thomas (did not stand)	—
Party	Democratic	Republican
Leader since	January 8, 1907	—
Leader's seat	24th–Barbour Co.	—
Last election	35 seats, 87.90%	0 seats, 11.68%
Seats before	35	0
Seats won	34	1
Seat change	▼1	▲1
Popular vote	80,794	9,964
Percentage	87.85%	10.83%
- Democratic hold Republican gain Democratic: 50–60% 60–70% 70–80% 80–90% Unopposed; Republican: 50–60%
President pro tempore before election
E. P. Thomas
Democratic
Elected President pro tempore
Hugh Morrow
Democratic

An election in the U.S. state of Alabama took place on Tuesday, November 8, 1910, to elect 35 representatives to serve 4-year terms in the Alabama Senate.

Thirty-four senators elected were Democrats, and one, James B. Sloan, was a Republican elected to represent the 3rd district. Democrat Finis E. St. John, Sloan's opponent in the general election, filed a contest against Sloan's election alleging voter irregularities in Winston County, a Republican stronghold. St. John withdrew his contest by December 28.

Senator Hugh Morrow of Jefferson County was elected President pro tempore of the Senate without opposition when the legislature convened on January 10, 1911.

== General election results ==
District	Democrats			Republicans			Independents			Total		
District	Candidate	Votes	%	Candidate	Votes	%	Candidate	Votes	%	Votes	Maj.	Mrg.
1st	Thurston H. Allen	2,238	88.67%	A. J. McGee	286	11.33%	—	—	—	2,524	+1,952	+77.34%
2nd	C. M. Sherrod	2,435	81.19%	T. P. Wood	564	18.81%	—	—	—	2,999	+1,871	+62.39%
3rd	Finis E. St. John	3,065	47.28%	James B. Sloan	3,417	52.72%	—	—	—	6,482	−352	−5.43%
6th	Watt T. Brown	2,575	64.25%	M. M. Davidson	1,433	35.75%	—	—	—	4,008	+1,142	+28.49%
7th	Thomas Kilby	1,776	84.37%	Fred D. Noble	329	15.63%	—	—	—	2,105	+1,447	+68.74%
8th	Thomas S. Plowman	1,229	87.47%	T. M. Roberts	176	12.53%	—	—	—	1,405	+1,053	+74.95%
15th	Thomas A. Curry	2,778	52.65%	P. E. Alexander	2,498	47.35%	—	—	—	5,276	+280	+5.31%
29th	James A. Nance	2,703	69.20%	—	—	—	Z. T. Brock	1,203	30.80%	3,906	+1,500	+38.40%
34th	Walter B. Merrill	2,959	70.12%	H. C. Knight	1,261	29.88%	—	—	—	4,220	+1,698	+40.24%
Source: Alabama Official and Statistical Register, 1911. (p. 299–302)

=== Elected unopposed ===
The following candidates did not see any competition in the general election:

- District 4: Robert E. Spragins (Democratic, incumbent) received 1,631 votes.
- District 5: Charles W. Brown (Democratic) received 2,863 votes.
- District 9: James D. Norman (Democratic) received 2,424 votes.
- District 10: Oscar S. Justice (Democratic) received 3,105 votes.
- District 11: Frank S. Moody (Democratic, incumbent) received 1,841 votes.
- District 12: Cecil A. Beasley (Democratic) received 3,523 votes.
- District 13: Hugh Morrow (Democratic) received 7,190 votes.
- District 14: Samuel H. Sprott (Democratic) received 1,256 votes.
- District 16: Charles P. Rogers Sr. (Democratic) received 501 votes.
- District 17: William C. Crumpton (Democratic) received 3,125 votes.
- District 18: William J. Vaiden (Democratic) received 1,676 votes.
- District 19: Benjamin D. Turner (Democratic) received 1,884 votes. Turner died on January 15, 1911, before he could be sworn in.
- District 20: Charles H. Miller (Democratic) received 1,933 votes.
- District 21: Edwin M. Lovelace (Democratic) received 1,760 votes.
- District 22: Norman D. Godbold (Democratic) received 761 votes.
- District 23: Charles A. Stokes (Democratic) received 2,332 votes.
- District 24: Robert Moulthrop (Democratic) received 1,229 votes.
- District 25: Felix Folmar (Democratic) received 3,753 votes.
- District 26: Thomas S. Frazer (Democratic) received 1,231 votes.
- District 27: Noah P. Renfroe (Democratic) received 1,264 votes.
- District 28: Michel H. Screws (Democratic) received 2,200 votes.
- District 30: Victor B. Atkins (Democratic) received 2,503 votes.
- District 31: Ernest B. Fite (Democratic) received 2,771 votes.
- District 32: Alfred M. Turnstall (Democratic) received 1,029 votes.
- District 33: Thomas M. Stevens (Democratic) received 2,546 votes. 7 write-in votes were recorded.
- District 35: John J. Espy (Democratic) received 2,705 votes. 1 write-in vote was recorded.

== 1907–1910 special elections ==
=== District 5 (Jackson–Marshall) ===
June 22, 1909 Senate District 5 special election Resignation of John A. Lusk
Party	Candidate	Votes	%
Democratic	Samuel Phillips	752	59.07%
Democratic	C. M. Smith	521	40.93%
Total votes		1,273	100.00%
Democratic hold			

=== District 25 (Coffee–Crenshaw–Pike) ===
September 28, 1907 Senate District 25 special election Resignation of Lucien D. Gardner
Party	Candidate	Votes	%
Democratic	John Gamble	1,184	99.50%
Write-in	J. S. Carroll	6	0.50%
Total votes		1,190	100.00%
Democratic hold			
