= Senator Strong (disambiguation) =

Caleb Strong (1745–1819) was a U.S. Senator from Massachusetts from 1789 to 1796. Senator Strong may refer to:

- Bennett Strong (1819–1906), Wisconsin State Senate
- Demas Strong (1820–1893), New York State Senate
- Frances Strong (1931–2024), Alabama State Senate
- Henry W. Strong (1810–1848), New York State Senate
- Jack Boynton Strong (1930–2015), Texas State Senate
- John Strong (Michigan politician) (1830–1913), Michigan State Senate
- Julius L. Strong (1828–1872), Connecticut State Senate
- Pearl Strong (1922–1997), Kentucky State Senate
- Luther M. Strong (1838–1903), Ohio State Senate
- Simeon Strong (1735–1805), Massachusetts State Senate
- Theodore Strong (New Jersey politician) (1863–1928), New Jersey State Senate
