= Hugh Morrow III =

American politician

Member of the Alabama Senate from the 12th district
- In office 1966–1970

Member of the Alabama House of Representatives from the Jefferson County district
- In office 1958–1966

Personal details
- Born: November 28, 1931 Birmingham, Alabama, U.S.
- Died: December 28, 1975 (aged 44) Birmingham, Alabama, U.S.
- Spouse: Jane Kaul (m. 1960)
- Children: 2
- Education: University of Alabama, University of the South
- Occupation: banker

Hugh Morrow III (November 28, 1931 – December 28, 1975) was an American politician who served as a member of the Alabama House of Representatives and Alabama State Senate, representing Jefferson County in the House the 12th district in the Senate.

Morrow was born in Birmingham in 1926 to Hugh Jr. and Dorothy (née Thomas) Morrow. His grandfather was Hugh Morrow, who was also an Alabama state politician, lawyer and businessman. He was raised and educated in Birmingham, served in the United States Army from 1952 to 1954, and later attended the University of Alabama and University of the South. Morrow was an investment banker, serving as vice president and director of the City National Bank of Birmingham as well as director of the American National Bank & Trust Company in Mobile, Alabama. He was first elected to the Alabama House of Representatives in 1958 and served until his election to the State Senate in 1966. He unsuccessfully ran for Lieutenant Governor of Alabama in 1970, losing to Jere Beasley in a runoff.

In 1972, Morrow underwent open heart surgery; during his recovery he went missing for three days after failing to return from his home at which time he experienced amnesia. Morrow was killed in a single vehicle automobile accident at the age of 44 on December 28, 1975, when he crashed his vehicle into a concrete bridge pillar on U.S. Route 280 near his home in Birmingham. He is buried at Elmwood Cemetery in Birmingham.
