= Greg Albritton =

American politician (born 1952)

Member of the Alabama Senate from the 22nd district
- Incumbent
- Assumed office November 5, 2014
- Preceded by: Marc Keahey

Member of the Alabama House of Representatives from the 64th district
- In office November 6, 2002 – November 8, 2006
- Preceded by: Jimmy Warren
- Succeeded by: Harry Shiver

Personal details
- Born: March 18, 1952 (age 74) Range, Alabama, U.S.
- Party: Republican
- Education: Northwest Florida State College; Weber State University (BS); Faulkner University (JD)

Greg Albritton (born March 18, 1952) is an American politician who has served in the Alabama Senate from the 22nd district since 2014. He previously served in the Alabama House of Representatives from the 64th district from 2002 to 2006.

== Legislation ==
In May 2019, he voted to make abortion a crime at any stage in a pregnancy, with no exceptions for cases of rape or incest.

== Congressional race ==
In November 2023, Albritton announced his candidacy to represent Alabama's 2nd congressional district in the U.S. House of Representatives. He ran unsuccessfully as a Republican in the March 5, 2024, primary election.
