= Marc Keahey =

American politician

George Marc Keahey

Member of the Alabama Senate from the 22nd district
- In office 2009–2014
- Preceded by: Pat Lindsey
- Succeeded by: Greg Albritton

Personal details
- Born: 1980 (age 45–46)
- Party: Democratic
- Spouse: Karie Keahey
- Education: University of Alabama; Cumberland School of Law
- Occupation: Attorney
- Website: Keahey for Senate

Marc Keahey was a Democratic member of the Alabama Senate, representing the 22nd district.

== Personal life and education ==
Keahey earned a business degree from the University of Alabama, and in 2004 earned a JD from Cumberland School of Law. He has a wife, Karie, and four children.

== Career ==
After graduating from law school, Keahey served as a public defender, assistant district attorney, and private lawyer. Keahey was elected to the Alabama House of Representatives in 2006, and won a special election the Alabama Senate in 2009. He won election to a full Senate term in 2010. Keahey served on the Agriculture, Conservation and Forestry Committee, Business and Labor Committee, Fiscal Responsibility and Accountability Committee, Judiciary, and the Local Legislation No. 3 Committee.

In 2010, Keahey was named Legislator of the Year by the Alabama Association of Conservation Districts.

He dropped his re-election bid in 2014 after the Republican-controlled Senate redrew his district to be majority Republican.
