= Charles Steele Jr. =

American politician

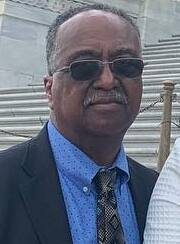
- Steele in 2019

6th and 8th President of the Southern Christian Leadership Conference
- In office 2012–2024
- Preceded by: Howard W. Creecy Jr.
- Succeeded by: DeMark Liggins
- In office 2004–2009
- Preceded by: Fred Shuttlesworth
- Succeeded by: Howard W. Creecy Jr.

Member of the Alabama Senate from the 24th district
- In office November 8, 1994 – August 11, 2004
- Preceded by: Walter Owens
- Succeeded by: Bobby Singleton

Personal details
- Born: August 3, 1946 (age 80) Tuscaloosa, Alabama, U.S.

Charles Steele Jr. (born August 3, 1946) is an American businessman, politician and civil rights leader. He was the first African American elected to the City Council of Tuscaloosa and one of the first African Americans elected to the Alabama State Senate. From 2004 to 2009, he was the National President and CEO of the Southern Christian Leadership Conference, co-founded by Martin Luther King Jr. Steele is the founder and President of Charles Steele and Associates, located in Atlanta, Georgia.

== Education ==
Steele was born in Tuscaloosa, Alabama. He graduated high school from Druid City High School in Tuscaloosa, Alabama and attended college at Mississippi Valley State University and Oakland University. He received his bachelor's degree from American International University at the Paramaribo, Suriname, South America campus. He earned a doctoral degree from Mt. Carmel Theological Seminary. He also holds an honorary Doctor of Human Letters degree from Stillman College in Tuscaloosa, Alabama, an honorary Doctorate of Christian Education from The F.T. Bozeman School of Ministry and Global Evangelical Christian College of Louisiana.

== Political career ==
In 1985 he was elected to the Tuscaloosa City Council, where he served two terms. During his tenure as city councilman, he organized the Unity Day Scholarship Fund, the Tuscaloosa Police Athletic League, and secured funds for the purchase of Palmore Park and Barrs’ Quarters (Charles Steele Estates). This was the first homeownership program in West Alabama. He obtained the funds to build the Bernice Washington Insight Center, a drug treatment center. He organized the Tuscaloosa Drug Task Force and after many years of relenting efforts, the Partners For a Drug Free Tuscaloosa County (formerly Tuscaloosa Drug Task Force). During that time the partnership was awarded $1 million.

In 1994, he was elected to the Alabama State Senate and re-elected three times before resigning to become president of the SCLC in August 2004. In April 2006, he was inducted into the Martin Luther King Jr. Board of Preachers of Morehouse College. On April 20, 2006, he was inducted into the Tuscaloosa Civic Hall of Fame.
