= Alabama's 12th Senate district =

Alabama's 12th State Senate district
Senator
Keith Kelley; R–Anniston
- Demographics: 70.2% White; 22.5% Black; 3.6% Hispanic; 0.6% Asian
- Population (2022): 149,342

Alabama's 12th Senate district is one of 35 districts in the Alabama Senate. The district has been represented by Keith Kelley since 2022.

== Geography ==
Election	Map	Counties in District
2026; 2022		Calhoun, portion of Talladega
2018		Calhoun, portion of Talladega
2014		Calhoun, portions of Clay, Talladega
2010; 2006; 2002		Portions of Calhoun, St Clair

== Election history ==
=== Elections in the 2020s ===
Alabama Senate election, 2022: Senate District 12
Party	Candidate	Votes	%	±%
Republican	Keith Kelley	28,786	73.61	+9.11
Democratic	Danny McCullars	10,271	26.26	−9.05
Write-in		49	0.13	-0.06
Majority		18,515	47.35	+22.16
Turnout		39,106		
Republican hold				

=== Elections in the 2010s ===
Alabama Senate election, 2018: Senate District 12
Party	Candidate	Votes	%	±%
Republican	Del Marsh (Incumbent)	27,416	64.50	+7.41
Democratic	Jim Williams	15,010	35.31	−7.32
Write-in		79	0.19	-0.09
Majority		12,406	29.19	+14.73
Turnout		42,505		
Republican hold				

Alabama Senate election, 2014: Senate District 12
Party	Candidate	Votes	%	±%
Republican	Del Marsh (Incumbent)	17,646	57.09	−6.57
Democratic	Taylor Stewart	13,178	42.63	+6.39
Write-in		85	0.28	+0.18
Majority		4,468	14.46	−12.95
Turnout		30,909		
Republican hold				

Alabama Senate election, 2010: Senate District 12
Party	Candidate	Votes	%	±%
Republican	Del Marsh (Incumbent)	26,714	63.66	−34.55
Democratic	Wallace Wyatt Jr.	15,210	36.24	+36.24
Write-in		42	0.10	-1.69
Majority		11,504	27.41	−69.00
Turnout		41,966		
Republican hold				

=== Elections in the 2000s ===
Alabama Senate election, 2006: Senate District 12
Party	Candidate	Votes	%	±%
Republican	Del Marsh (Incumbent)	26,047	98.21	+39.03
Write-in		476	1.79	+1.45
Majority		25,571	96.41	+77.72
Turnout		26,523		
Republican hold				

Alabama Senate election, 2002: Senate District 12
Party	Candidate	Votes	%	±%
Republican	Del Marsh (Incumbent)	22,712	59.18	+8.25
Democratic	Preston Gray Jr.	15,537	40.48	−8.53
Write-in		131	0.34	+0.28
Majority		7,175	18.69	+16.78
Turnout		38,380		
Republican hold				

=== Elections in the 1990s ===
Alabama Senate election, 1998: Senate District 12
Party	Candidate	Votes	%	±%
Republican	Del Marsh	16,102	50.93	+8.29
Democratic	Cleo Thomas	15,497	49.01	−8.35
Write-in		20	0.06	+0.06
Majority		605	1.91	−12.80
Turnout		31,619		
Republican gain from Democratic				

Alabama Senate election, 1994: Senate District 12
Party	Candidate	Votes	%	±%
Democratic	Doug Ghee (Incumbent)	15,147	57.36	−3.99
Republican	Mike James	11,262	42.64	+3.99
Majority		3,885	14.71	−7.99
Turnout		26,409		
Democratic hold				

Alabama Senate election, 1990: Senate District 12
Party	Candidate	Votes	%	±%
Democratic	Doug Ghee	17,033	61.35	−38.65
Republican	Mike James	10,731	38.65	+38.65
Majority		6,302	22.70	−77.30
Turnout		27,764		
Democratic hold				

=== Elections in the 1980s ===
Alabama Senate election, 1986: Senate District 12
Party	Candidate	Votes	%	±%
Democratic	Donald Holmes (Incumbent)	20,030	100.00	
Majority		20,030	100.00	
Turnout		20,030		
Democratic hold				

Alabama Senate election, 1983: Senate District 12
Party	Candidate	Votes	%	±%
Democratic	Donald Holmes	4,013	100.00	+23.54
Majority		4,013	100.00	+47.09
Turnout		4,013		
Democratic hold				

Alabama Senate election, 1982: Senate District 12
Party	Candidate	Votes	%	±%
Democratic	John Amari	20,892	76.46	
Republican	M. H. "Red" Walker	6,433	23.54	
Majority		14,459	52.91	
Turnout		27,325		
Democratic hold				

=== Earlier elections ===
Following Reynolds v. Sims in 1964, which ruled that electoral districts of state legislatures must be roughly equal in population, the Alabama Senate was reapportioned to elect 35 Senators from 26 districts. District 12 became a multi-member district, comprising Jefferson County and electing 7 Senators in 7 different contests. Following a further court case in 1972, the district, along with all others in the Alabama Senate, was reapportioned to a single-member district for the 1974 election.

== District officeholders ==
Senators take office at midnight on the day of their election.

- Keith Kelley (2022–present)
- Del Marsh (1998–2022)
- Doug Ghee (1990–1998)
- Donald Holmes (1983–1990)
- John Amari (1982–1983)
- Paschal Vacca (1974–1982)

As a multi-member district:

- 1966:
  - Hugh Morrow III
  - Leland Childs
  - John H. Hawkins Jr.
  - Richard Dominick
  - George Bailes Jr.
  - Eddie Gilmore
  - Paschal Vacca
- 1970:
  - Paschal Vacca
  - Tom King
  - John H. Hawkins Jr.
  - Richard Dominick
  - George Bailes Jr.
  - Eddie Gilmore
  - Doug Cook

- Robert T. Wilson (1962–1966)
- Woodrow W Roberts (1958–1962)
- Reuben Newton (1954–1958)
