= Alabama's 22nd Senate district =

Alabama's 22nd State Senate district
Senator
Greg Albritton; R–Atmore
- Demographics: 72.7% White; 18.4% Black; 3.7% Hispanic; 0.3% Asian
- Population (2022): 138,592

Alabama's 22nd Senate district is one of 35 districts in the Alabama Senate. The district has been represented by Greg Albritton since 2014.

== Geography ==
Election	Map	Counties in District
2026; 2022		Escambia, Washington, portions of Baldwin, Mobile
2018		Clarke, Escambia, Washington, portions of Baldwin, Monroe
2014		Escambia, portions of Baldwin, Choctaw, Clarke, Conecuh, Mobile, Monroe, Washington
2010; 2006; 2002		Escambia, Washington, portions of Baldwin, Choctaw, Clarke, Conecuh, Mobile, Monroe

== Election history ==
=== Elections in the 2020s ===
Alabama Senate election, 2022: Senate District 22
Party	Candidate	Votes	%	±%
Republican	Greg Albritton (Incumbent)	32,880	98.79	+0.25
Write-in		404	1.21	-0.25
Majority		32,476	97.57	+0.48
Turnout		33,284		
Republican hold				

=== Elections in the 2010s ===
Alabama Senate election, 2018: Senate District 22
Party	Candidate	Votes	%	±%
Republican	Greg Albritton (Incumbent)	34,507	98.54	+31.34
Write-in		510	1.46	+1.38
Majority		33,997	97.09	+62.60
Turnout		35,017		
Republican hold				

Alabama Senate election, 2014: Senate District 22
Party	Candidate	Votes	%	±%
Republican	Greg Albritton	23,162	67.20	+22.65
Democratic	Susan Smith	11,275	32.71	−22.67
Write-in		29	0.08	+0.01
Majority		11,887	34.49	+23.66
Turnout		34,466		
Republican gain from Democratic				

Alabama Senate election, 2010: Senate District 22
Party	Candidate	Votes	%	±%
Democratic	Marc Keahey (Incumbent)	24,785	55.38	−2.40
Republican	Danny Joyner	19,939	44.55	+2.60
Write-in		31	0.07	-0.20
Majority		4,846	10.83	−5.00
Turnout		44,755		
Democratic hold				

=== Elections in the 2000s ===
Alabama Senate District 22 special election - 2 June 2009
Party	Candidate	Votes	%	±%
Democratic	Marc Keahey	8,443	57.78	+3.72
Republican	Greg Albritton	6,130	41.95	−3.91
Write-in		39	0.27	+0.19
Majority		2,313	15.83	+7.63
Turnout		14,612		
Democratic hold				

Alabama Senate election, 2006: Senate District 22
Party	Candidate	Votes	%	±%
Democratic	Pat Lindsey (Incumbent)	19,744	54.06	+2.94
Republican	John McMillan	16,748	45.86	−2.81
Write-in		29	0.08	-0.14
Majority		2,996	8.20	+5.75
Turnout		36,521		
Democratic hold				

Alabama Senate election, 2002: Senate District 22
Party	Candidate	Votes	%	±%
Democratic	Pat Lindsey (Incumbent)	18,899	51.12	−5.23
Republican	Sheldon Day	17,993	48.67	+5.09
Write-in		81	0.22	+0.15
Majority		906	2.45	−10.32
Turnout		36,973		
Democratic hold				

=== Elections in the 1990s ===
Alabama Senate election, 1998: Senate District 22
Party	Candidate	Votes	%	±%
Democratic	Pat Lindsey (Incumbent)	19,749	56.35	−5.19
Republican	Danny Joyner	15,273	43.58	+5.18
Write-in		25	0.07	+0.01
Majority		4,476	12.77	−10.38
Turnout		35,047		
Democratic hold				

Alabama Senate election, 1994: Senate District 22
Party	Candidate	Votes	%	±%
Democratic	Pat Lindsey (Incumbent)	20,039	61.54	−38.32
Republican	Barry Hughes	12,502	38.40	+38.40
Write-in		20	0.06	-0.08
Majority		7,537	23.15	
Turnout		32,561		
Democratic hold				

Alabama Senate election, 1990: Senate District 22
Party	Candidate	Votes	%	±%
Democratic	Pat Lindsey	23,273	99.86	−0.14
Write-in		32	0.14	+0.14
Majority		23,241	99.73	−0.27
Turnout		23,305		
Democratic hold				

=== Elections in the 1980s ===
Alabama Senate election, 1986: Senate District 22
Party	Candidate	Votes	%	±%
Democratic	Rick Manley	22,682	100.00	
Majority		22,682	100.00	
Turnout		22,682		
Democratic hold				

Alabama Senate election, 1983: Senate District 22
Party	Candidate	Votes	%	±%
Democratic	Frances Strong	8,562	52.64	−14.67
Republican	Don French	7,702	47.35	+14.70
Write-in		1	0.01	-0.03
Majority		860	5.29	−29.37
Turnout		16,265		
Democratic hold				

Alabama Senate election, 1982: Senate District 22
Party	Candidate	Votes	%	±%
Democratic	Danny Corbett	14,803	67.31	
Republican	Sam Pierce	7,181	32.65	
Write-in		8	0.04	
Majority		7,622	34.66	
Turnout		21,992		
Democratic hold				

== District officeholders ==
Senators take office at midnight on the day of their election.

- Greg Albritton (2014–present)
- Marc Keahey (2009–2014)
- Pat Lindsey (1990–2009)
- Rick Manley (1986–1990)
- Frances Strong (1983–1986)
- Danny Corbett (1982–1983)
- G. J. Higginbotham (1978–1982)
- C. C. Torbert Jr. (1974–1978)
- L. L. Dozier (1970–1974)
- W. Ray Lolley (1966–1970)
- L. D. Bentley Jr. (1962–1966)
- Roland Cooper (1954–1962)
