= Alabama's 24th Senate district =

Alabama's 24th State Senate district
Senator
Bobby Singleton; D–Greensboro
- Demographics: 37.0% White; 58.1% Black; 2.2% Hispanic; 0.9% Asian
- Population (2022): 145,275

Alabama's 24th Senate district is one of 35 districts in the Alabama Senate. The district has been represented by Bobby Singleton, the Senate Minority Leader, since a special election in 2005.

== Geography ==
Election	Map	Counties in District
2026; 2022		Choctaw, Greene, Hale, Marengo, Sumter, portion of Tuscaloosa
2018		Choctaw, Greene, Hale, Sumter, portions of Marengo, Pickens, Tuscaloosa
2014		Greene, Sumter, portions of Choctaw, Clarke, Hale, Marengo, Pickens, Tuscaloosa
2010; 2006; 2002		Greene, Sumter, portions of Bibb, Choctaw, Hale, Marengo, Perry, Tuscaloosa

== Election history ==
=== Elections in the 2020s ===
Alabama Senate election, 2022: Senate District 24
Party	Candidate	Votes	%	±%
Democratic	Bobby Singleton (Incumbent)	25,440	82.04	−16.45
Libertarian	Richard Benderson	5,311	17.13	+17.13
Write-in		259	0.84	-0.67
Majority		20,129	64.91	−32.07
Turnout		31,010		
Democratic hold				

=== Elections in the 2010s ===
Alabama Senate election, 2018: Senate District 24
Party	Candidate	Votes	%	±%
Democratic	Bobby Singleton (Incumbent)	37,394	98.49	−0.40
Write-in		574	1.51	+0.40
Majority		36,820	96.98	−0.80
Turnout		37,968		
Democratic hold				

Alabama Senate election, 2014: Senate District 24
Party	Candidate	Votes	%	±%
Democratic	Bobby Singleton (Incumbent)	26,859	98.89	+0.55
Write-in		301	1.11	-0.55
Majority		26,558	97.78	+1.11
Turnout		27,160		
Democratic hold				

Alabama Senate election, 2010: Senate District 24
Party	Candidate	Votes	%	±%
Democratic	Bobby Singleton (Incumbent)	30,803	98.34	+0.24
Write-in		521	1.66	-0.24
Majority		30,282	96.67	+0.47
Turnout		31,324		
Democratic hold				

=== Elections in the 2000s ===
Alabama Senate election, 2006: Senate District 24
Party	Candidate	Votes	%	±%
Democratic	Bobby Singleton (Incumbent)	27,556	98.10	+12.02
Write-in		533	1.90	+1.73
Majority		27,023	96.20	+23.88
Turnout		28,089		
Democratic hold				

Alabama Senate District 24 special election - 25 January 2005
Party	Candidate	Votes	%	±%
Democratic	Bobby Singleton	10,663	86.08	−12.27
Republican	James E. Carter	1,704	13.76	+13.76
Write-in		21	0.17	-1.48
Majority		8,959	72.32	
Turnout		12,388		
Democratic hold				

Alabama Senate election, 2002: Senate District 24
Party	Candidate	Votes	%	±%
Democratic	Charles Steele Jr. (Incumbent)	28,942	98.35	+24.13
Write-in		487	1.65	+1.52
Majority		28,455	96.69	+48.12
Turnout		29,429		
Democratic hold				

=== Elections in the 1990s ===
Alabama Senate election, 1998: Senate District 24
Party	Candidate	Votes	%	±%
Democratic	Charles Steele Jr. (Incumbent)	24,295	74.22	−25.20
Republican	Williams	8,396	25.65	+25.65
Write-in		44	0.13	-0.45
Majority		15,899	48.57	−50.27
Turnout		32,735		
Democratic hold				

Alabama Senate election, 1994: Senate District 24
Party	Candidate	Votes	%	±%
Democratic	Charles Steele Jr.	23,933	99.42	+25.44
Write-in		140	0.58	+0.58
Majority		23,793	98.84	+50.87
Turnout		24,073		
Democratic hold				

Alabama Senate election, 1990: Senate District 24
Party	Candidate	Votes	%	±%
Democratic	Walter Owens	26,468	73.98	+18.06
Republican	Pat Owens	9,307	26.01	−18.07
Write-in		1	0.00	+0.00
Majority		17,161	47.97	+36.13
Turnout		35,776		
Democratic hold				

=== Elections in the 1980s ===
Alabama Senate election, 1986: Senate District 24
Party	Candidate	Votes	%	±%
Democratic	Earl Goodwin (Incumbent)	20,119	55.92	+5.49
Republican	Cordy Taylor	15,858	44.08	+25.87
Majority		4,261	11.84	−7.23
Turnout		35,977		
Democratic hold				

Alabama Senate election, 1983: Senate District 24
Party	Candidate	Votes	%	±%
Democratic	Earl Goodwin	7,211	50.43	−49.57
Independent	Walter Owens	4,484	31.36	+31.36
Republican	Ed Martin	2,604	18.21	+18.21
Majority		2,727	19.07	−80.93
Turnout		14,299		
Democratic hold				

Alabama Senate election, 1982: Senate District 24
Party	Candidate	Votes	%	±%
Democratic	Chip Bailey (Incumbent)	16,273	100.00	
Majority		16,273	100.00	
Turnout		16,273		
Democratic hold				

=== Earlier elections ===
Following Reynolds v. Sims in 1964, which ruled that electoral districts of state legislatures must be roughly equal in population, the Alabama Senate was reapportioned to elect 35 Senators from 26 districts. District 24 became a multi-member district, comprising Mobile County and electing 3 Senators in 3 different contests. Following a further court case in 1972, the district, along with all others in the Alabama Senate, was reapportioned to a single-member district for the 1974 election.

== District officeholders ==
Senators take office at midnight on the day of their election.

- Bobby Singleton (2005–present)
- Charles Steele Jr. (1994–2004)
- Walter Owens (1990–1994)
- Earl Goodwin (1983–1990)
- Chip Bailey (1978–1983)
- Sam L. Adams (1974–1978)

As a multi-member district:

- 1966:
  - Mylan R. Engel
  - Pierre Pelham
  - William H. McDermott
- 1970:
  - L. W. Noonan
  - Pierre Pelham
  - Robert S. Edington

- James S. Clark (1958–1966)
- George E. Little (1954–1958)
