= James S. Clark =

American politician

Jimmy Clark

63rd Speaker of the Alabama House of Representatives
- In office 1987–1999
- Preceded by: Tom Drake
- Succeeded by: Seth Hammett

Member of the Alabama House of Representatives from the 84th district
- In office 1984–1999
- Preceded by: Dwight Faulk
- Succeeded by: Billy Beasley

Member of the Alabama Senate
- In office November 4, 1958 – November 5, 1974
- Preceded by: George E. Little
- Succeeded by: T. Dudley Perry
- Constituency: 24th district (1958–1966); 23rd district (1966–1974)

Personal details
- Born: James Sterling Clark; October 7, 1921 Eufaula, Alabama, U.S.
- Died: June 6, 2000 (aged 78) Eufaula, Alabama, U.S.
- Party: Democratic
- Spouse: Marie Kendall

Military service
- Allegiance: United States
- Branch/service: United States Army
- Unit: Army Air Forces
- Battles/wars: World War II

James Sterling Clark (October 7, 1921 – June 6, 2000) of Eufaula, Barbour County, Alabama, served as the mayor of the City of Eufaula from 1976 to 1978, and served four consecutive terms in the Senate of Alabama from 1958 to 1974. He served as the chair of the Senate Rules Committee for 12 of those 16 years. Clark was initially elected to the Alabama House of Representatives in 1983, representing Barbour and Russell Counties, during which he served as the chair of the House Rules Committee, and subsequently was reelected by the residents of his district for three additional terms, 1986 to 1990, 1990 to 1994, and 1994 to 1998.

Clark was elected by the members of the House with the Office of Speaker in 1987, 1991, and an unprecedented third term in 1995. Clark died in June 2000.

== Sources ==
- Resolution of the Alabama House of Representatives, 1999, HJR2, By Representative Newton (D), RFD, Rd 1 12-JAN-1999
