= Pat Lindsey =

American politician

Member of the Alabama Senate
- In office November 6, 1990 – January 11, 2009
- Preceded by: Rick Manley
- Succeeded by: Marc Keahey
- Constituency: 22nd district
- In office November 8, 1966 – November 5, 1974
- Preceded by: H. P. James
- Succeeded by: Obie J. Littleton
- Constituency: 18th district

Personal details
- Born: March 17, 1936 Meridian, Mississippi
- Died: January 11, 2009 (aged 72) Boligee, Alabama
- Party: Democratic
- Spouse: Tricia
- Profession: Attorney

Wallace Henry "Pat" Lindsey, III (March 17, 1936 – January 11, 2009) was a Democratic member of the Alabama Senate, representing the 22nd District from 1982 until his death in 2009.

Lindsey first won election to the Alabama Senate for the 18th district in 1966. He served eight years, being reelected in 1970. He then retired from politics for more than a decade. He returned to the political arena in 1990, defeating incumbent Rick Manley.

Lindsey's family has been prominent in the area of Butler, Alabama in Choctaw County for generations. After earning a degree in geology at the University of Alabama, Lindsey attended law school there and became a practicing attorney. Lindsey was married twice with both marriages ending in divorce. He was the father of two children.
