= Frances Strong =

American politician (1931–2024)

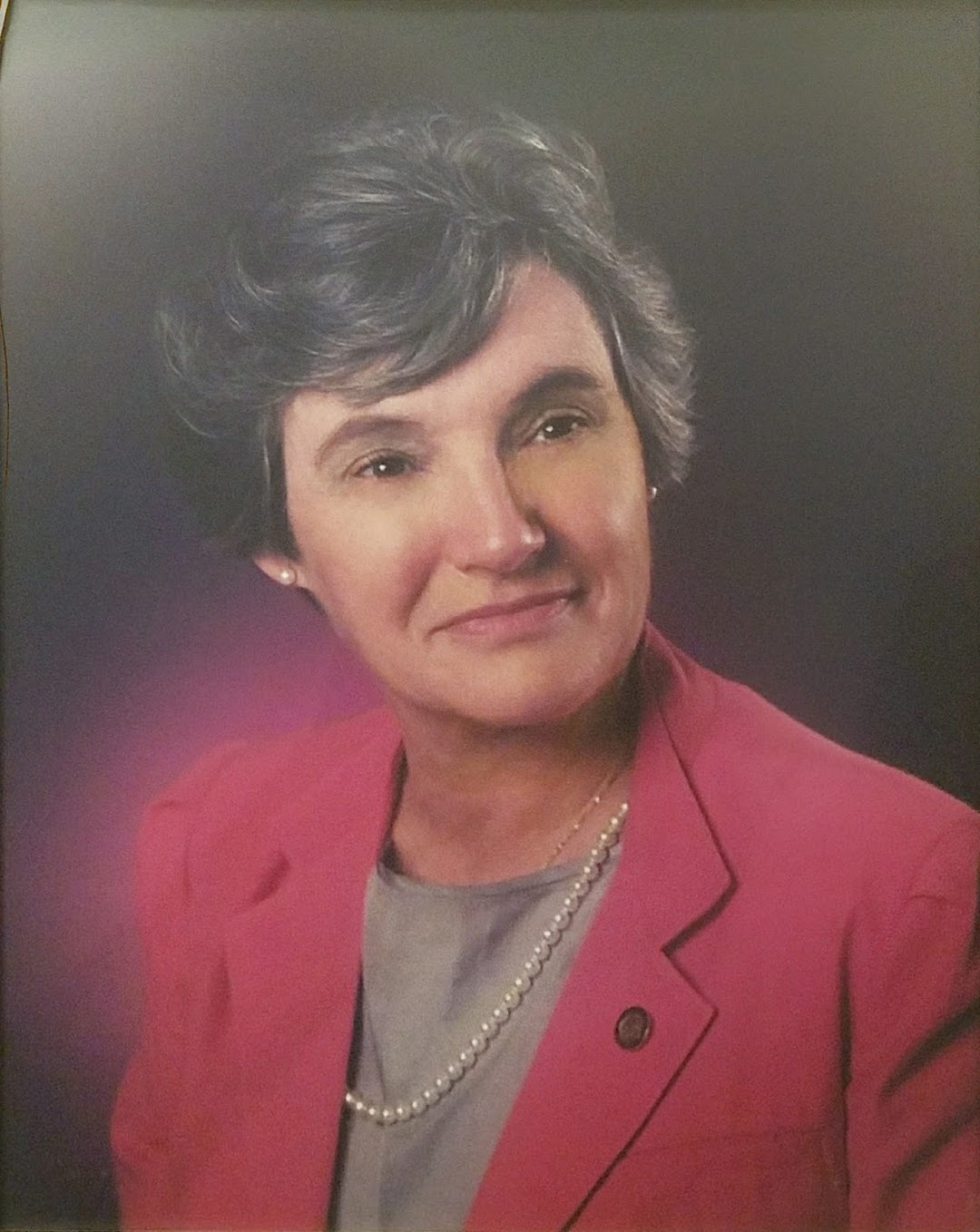

Member of the Alabama Senate from the 22nd district
- In office 1983–1986
- Succeeded by: Rick Manley

Personal details
- Born: Frances Webb Strong; January 11, 1931 Demopolis, Alabama, U.S.
- Died: November 14, 2024 (aged 93)
- Party: Democratic
- Children: 5
- Occupation: Teacher
- Nickname: Sister

Frances Webb "Sister" Strong (January 11, 1931 – November 14, 2024) was an American politician in the state of Alabama. She was the second woman to serve in the Alabama Senate, after Ann Bedsole. She served as a Democrat representing the 22nd district.

Strong was born and raised in Demopolis, Alabama, the daughter of Mem Creagh Webb and Frances Coleman Webb. Her great-grandfather was the founder of John C. Webb & Sons, a cotton merchandising business. She received the nickname "sister" as the younger of two sisters in her family. A teacher, she also served on the State Elections Commission and Alabama State Democratic Executive Committee prior to her election in 1983. She was married to Gilbert Burke Strong and had five daughters. Strong died on November 14, 2024, at the age of 93.
