= 1966 Alabama Superintendent of Education election =

1966 Alabama Superintendent of Education Democratic primary
- May 3, 1966
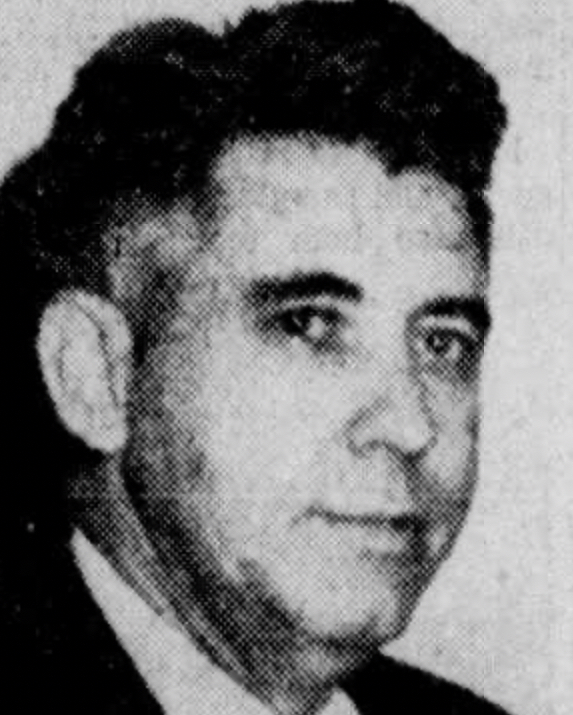

Candidate	Ernest Stone	Donald L. Horne
Party	Democratic	Democratic
Popular vote	404,539	251,236
Percentage	61.7%	38.3%
Superintendent before election
Austin R. Meadows
Democratic
Elected Superintendent
Ernest Stone
Democratic

The 1966 Alabama Superintendent of Education election was held on November 8, 1966, to elect the Alabama Superintendent of Education to a four-year term. The primary election was held on May 3. This election was the final election to the superintendent office, becoming a position appointed by the Alabama State Board of Education.

== Democratic primary ==
=== Candidates ===
==== Nominee ====
- Ernest Stone, educator

==== Eliminated in primary ====
- Donald L. Horne, superintendent of Cullman County

=== Results ===
Democratic primary
Party	Candidate	Votes	%
Democratic	Ernest Stone	404,539	61.69
Democratic	Donald L. Horne	251,236	38.31
Total votes		730,859	100.00

== General election ==
=== Endorsements ===
Ernest Stone

Newspapers

- The Cullman Times

=== Results ===
1966 Alabama Superintendent of Education election
Party	Candidate	Votes	%
Democratic	Ernest Stone	567,367	100.00
Total votes		567,367	100.00
