= Jack Giles (politician) =

American politician (1915–1982)

Member of the Alabama Senate from the 3rd district
- In office November 8, 1966 – November 3, 1970
- Preceded by: Roscoe O. Roberts (Note: Member of the 4th district, Madison County)
- Succeeded by: Gene McLain

Personal details
- Born: November 21, 1915 Marion Junction, Alabama
- Died: July 12, 1982 (aged 66) Birmingham, Alabama
- Party: Democratic
- Spouse: Marjorie Birleen Brown (m. 1942)
- Education: Snead State Community College; Auburn University; University of Alabama (LLB)

Jack Giles (November 21, 1915 – July 12, 1982) was an American politician who served in the Alabama Senate from District 3, representing all of Madison County from 1966 to 1970. He was a member of the Democratic Party.

Giles was born to Thomas and Molly Ora Giles on November 21, 1915, in Marion Junction, Alabama. He attended public schools throughout several counties in Alabama, Snead State Community College, and Auburn University. He enlisted in the Alabama National Guard and ranked up to lieutenant colonel in the Inactive National Guard. He served in the Pacific theater of World War II, receiving a Purple Heart and a Presidential Unit Citation. He received a law degree from the University of Alabama in 1948 before practicing law in Huntsville and serving in multiple offices in the county and city in the 1950s and 1960s. During George Wallace’s gubernatorial administration, Giles served as the director of the state’s Department of Industrial Relations.

In 1964, he won a primary to be placed on the Democratic slate of presidential electors as an unpledged elector. The slate lost to conservative Republican nominee Barry Goldwater. In 1966, he was elected to the Alabama Senate from District 3 as a Democrat, winning the Democratic primary with 71.15% of the vote, and defeating a Republican opponent with 62.12% of the vote. In 1970, Giles did not seek re-election to the state senate, but instead campaigned for lieutenant governor on a platform of reducing air and water pollution in the state. Giles lost the Democratic nomination in the first round in an eight-man field. Jere Beasley won the runoff election with 57.78% of the vote.

On July 12, 1982, Giles died of a heart attack at the age of 66. At the time of his death, he was the chairman of the Alabama Space Science Commission.

== Electoral history ==
Jack Giles election results
Election	Winners			Runners-up		
Lieutenant Governor of Alabama
1970 prim	Jere Beasley (D); Hugh Morrow (D)	256,081; 185,333	29.03% 21.01%	Tom Radney (D); Joe Money (D); Jack Giles (D); Joe Goodwyn (D); James Gullate (D); Jay Thomas (D)	163,462; 100,131; 81,789; 75,085; 10,627; 9,631	18.53% 11.35% 9.27% 8.51% 1.21% 1.09%
Alabama Senate District 3
1966 gen	Jack Giles (D)	21,040	62.12%	Wayne Robinson (R)	12,828	37.88%
1966 prim	Jack Giles (D)	17,123	71.15%	Eugene J. Patterson (D)	6,944	28.85%
United States presidential elector
1964 gen (at-large)	Barry Goldwater (R)	479,085	69.45%	Unpledged (D)	210,732	30.55%
1964 prim (place 6)	Jack Giles (Unpledged)	481,763	81.60%	Harry Ayers (Pledged)	108,662	18.40%
