= Hugh Morrow (businessman) =

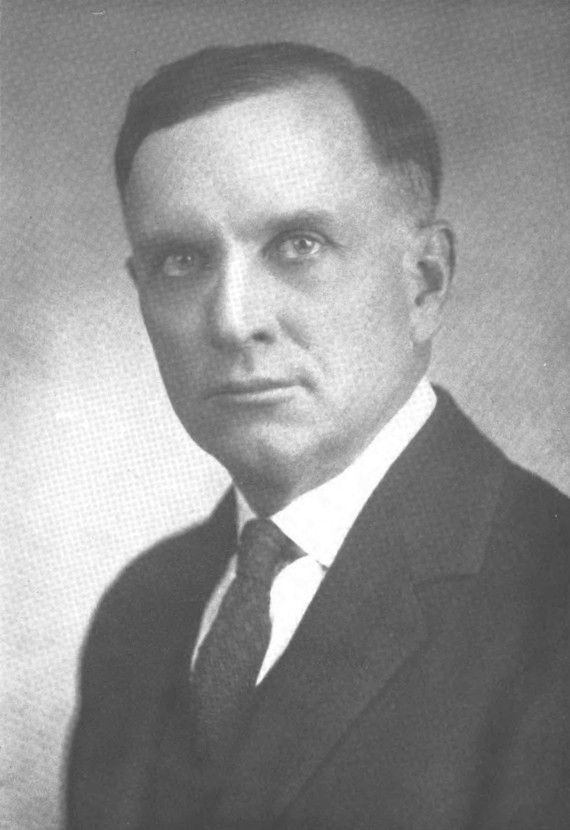

Member of the Alabama Senate from the 13th district
- In office 1900–1904
- In office 1911–1914

Personal details
- Born: May 19, 1873 Birmingham, Alabama
- Died: September 6, 1960 (aged 87)
- Party: Democratic
- Spouse: Margaret Julia Smith
- Relations: Hugh Morrow III (grandson)
- Education: University of Alabama
- Occupation: Businessman, lawyer

Hugh Morrow (May 19, 1873 - September 6, 1960) was an American lawyer, businessman, and politician. He worked at the firm of Tillman, Bradley & Morrow and served as the president of the Sloss-Sheffield Steel and Iron Company. He also served two terms in the Alabama Senate (1900-1904, 1911-1914).

== Early life and education ==
Morrow was born in Birmingham, Alabama, on May 19, 1873, to judge John Calhoun Morrow and Mary Antoinette (Walker) Morrow. Morrow received his preliminary education in the public schools of Birmingham, attending the Powell School. He graduated from Birmingham High School in 1889. He then attended the University of Alabama, receiving three degrees: A. B. (1893), LL. B. (1894), and M. A (1894).

== Law practice ==
Morrow began the practice of law in Birmingham in 1894 and served as assistant solicitor from 1896 to 1899. In 1899, he formed a partnership with Lee C. Bradley under the firm name of Bradley & Morrow. He later became a member of the law firm of Walker, Tillman, Campbell & Morrow, later reorganized as Tillman Grubb Bradley & Morrow and as Tillman, Bradley & Morrow. This firm was for many years among the most prominent in the American South, with clients including the Louisville and Nashville Railroad, the Seaboard Air Line Railroad, and the Atlanta, Birmingham, and Atlantic Railway.

== Business career ==
Morrow left Tillman, Bradley & Morrow in 1919, upon his election to the vice-presidency of the Sloss-Sheffield Steel and Iron Company. He became president of the company in 1925. He continued to manage the company through World War II.

== Politics and public service ==
Morrow served two terms in the Alabama Senate, representing the 13th district. Morrow was a member of the Democratic Party. During his first term (1900-1904), he was chairman of the Judiciary Committee. During his second term (1911-1914), he served as president pro tempore. As a legislator, Morrow sponsored a bill (passed into law) that made it less likely for mine owners to be found liable for industrial accidents. He also served for a number of years as a member of the board of trustees of the Alabama Department of Archives and History and as a member of the board of trustees of the University of Alabama (1908-1919). In his later life, Morrow was a staunch public defender of segregation and cofounded the pro-segregation American States' Rights Association. He supported the gubernatorial campaign of John Malcolm Patterson, who was endorsed by the Ku Klux Klan for his opposition to civil rights measures.

== Personal life and death ==
Morrow married Margaret Julia Smith on June 9, 1897. They had six children: Katherine Molton, Mamie Corrilla, Margaret Smith, Annie Louise, Hugh Jr., and Libby Elizabeth. He was a member of the Methodist Episcopal Church, South.

Morrow died on September 6, 1960, after a long illness.
