= Jere Beasley =

American politician (born 1935)

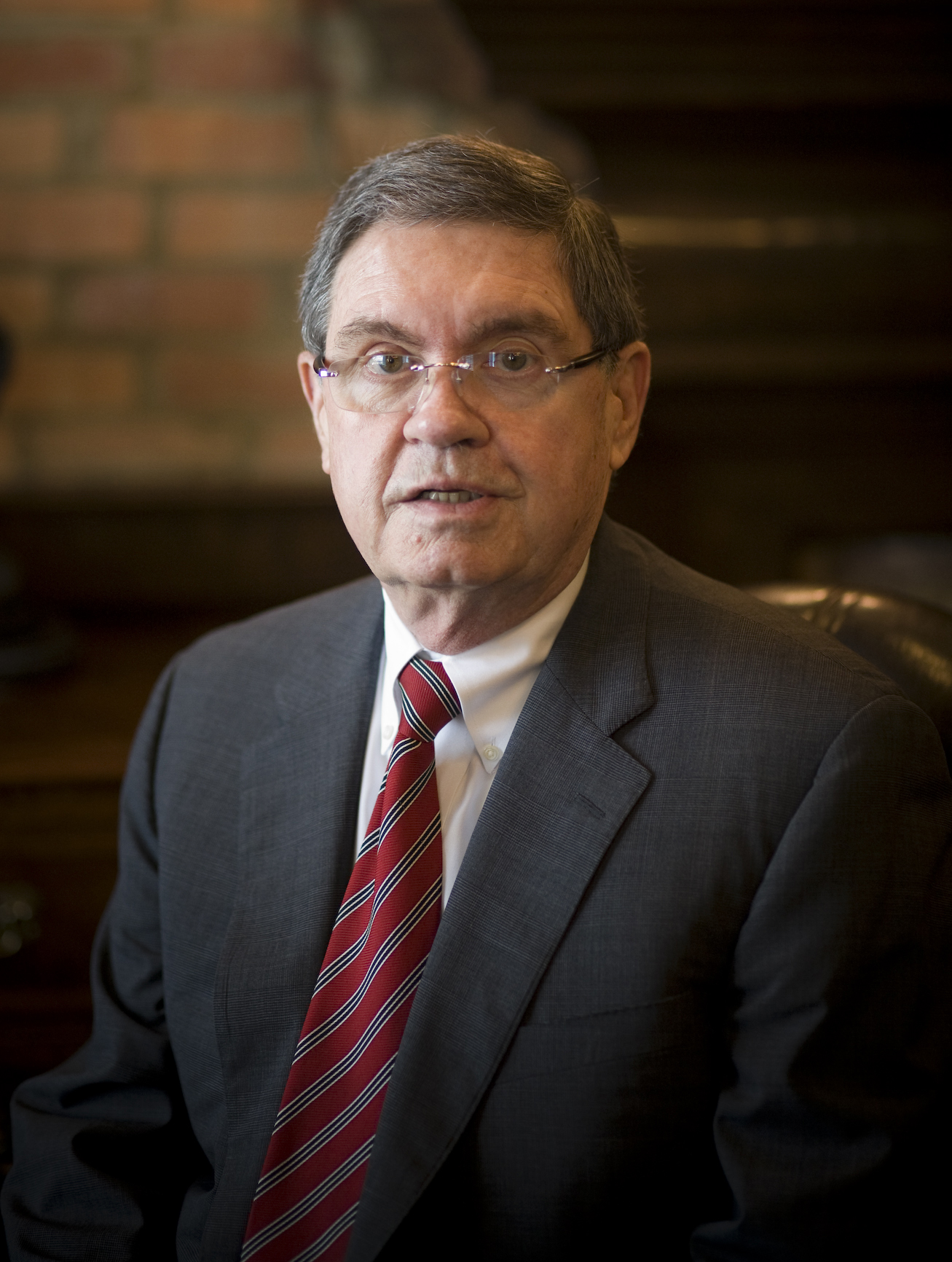

Acting Governor of Alabama
- In office June 5, 1972 – July 7, 1972 (Note: While George Wallace was incapacitated)
- Governor: George Wallace

22nd Lieutenant Governor of Alabama
- In office January 18, 1971 – January 15, 1979
- Governor: George Wallace
- Preceded by: Albert Brewer
- Succeeded by: George McMillan

Personal details
- Born: Jere Locke Beasley; December 12, 1935 (age 90) Tyler, Texas, U.S.
- Party: Democratic
- Education: Auburn University (BS); University of Alabama (JD)

Jere Locke Beasley (born December 12, 1935) is an American attorney and politician who served as the 22nd lieutenant governor of Alabama from 1971 to 1979; he briefly served as acting governor of Alabama from June 5 to July 7, 1972, following the attempted assassination of Governor George Wallace. His law firm has been noted nationally for winning major awards for its clients, including an $11.8 billion punitive damage award against ExxonMobil in 2003.

== Early life, education and marriage ==
Beasley was born in 1935 in Tyler, Texas, the son of Browder Locke Beasley and Florence née Camp. He was raised in Clayton, Alabama, where his father ran a small grocery store.

Beasley received a Bachelor of Science degree from Auburn University and in 1958 married Sara Baker. He earned a Juris Doctor from the University of Alabama School of Law in 1962.

== Career ==
Beasley worked for various law firms until he opened his own practice in 1965.

=== Alabama politics ===
In 1970, Beasley won the first round of the Democratic primary for lieutenant governor but he failed to win a majority. He won the runoff.

He was serving as 22nd Lieutenant Governor when Governor George Wallace was shot and severely injured in an assassination attempt in Laurel, Maryland, on May 15, 1972. Since Wallace was out of state for more than 20 days, recovering in a Maryland hospital, the Alabama Constitution required that the lieutenant governor take over temporarily as acting governor.

In 1974, Beasley faced a challenge from Charles Woods, who finished first in the primary. Beasley, like in 1970, won the runoff. He sought the nomination for governor in 1978, placing fifth.

In 2009, Beasley served as the campaign chair for Alabama gubernatorial candidate Artur Davis.

=== Private practice ===
In 1978, Jere Beasley ran for governor, but his campaign was unsuccessful. He decided to leave politics and return to practicing law. After seeking advice from his friend and mentor, the civil rights leader and Federal Judge, Frank M. Johnson, he decided to start his new firm. Beasley was clear about his calling and the purpose of the firm. His new practice would be a safe harbor for those who need help. He would do what many lawyers refused to do at the time – take on powerful corporate interests for consumers and hard-working employees, or “the little man” as others have described.

Founded on the principle of “helping those who need it most,” the firm was established to provide legal service to individuals and businesses whom no act of their own has wronged. That principle still serves as the bedrock for the firm's work. The firm, known today as Beasley, Allen, Crow, Methvin, Portis & Miles, P.C., has grown to more than 90 attorneys in Atlanta, Georgia; Mobile, Alabama; and Montgomery, Alabama and more than 200 support staff. On Jan. 7, 2024, Beasley Allen celebrated its 45th anniversary.

Beasley is noted as a trial lawyer, and his firm has a national reputation for winning major awards for its clients.

=== Notable cases ===
Beasley's law firm has handed the following major cases:

- September 1993 – Tractor and heavy equipment manufacturer Kubota agreed to pay the family of 67-year-old retired farmer Durwood Spivey $10 million after the B-7100 Kubota tractor he was riding overturned, crushing him under the 2,500-pound weight of the machine. Kubota had not equipped the tractor with a rollover protection structure, despite such protection being available to the tractor industry since the 1950s.
- November 2003 – A Montgomery County jury ordered Exxon Mobil Corporation to pay the State of Alabama a record $11.8 billion in punitive damages as well as an additional $103 million in compensatory damages for intentionally and willfully underpaying royalties on natural gas from the Mobile Bay field. Exxon appealed and gained a reduction in the award to $3.6 billion.
- November 2007 – Pharmaceutical company Merck & Co announced it would pay $4.85 billion to resolve claims that its anti-inflammatory drug Vioxx caused heart attacks, strokes and sudden cardiac death. The Vioxx settlement remains the largest pharmaceutical settlement in history.
- October 2013 – An Oklahoma City jury ordered Toyota to pay Jean Bookout and the family of deceased passenger Barbara Schwartz $3 million in compensatory damages and an additional $1.5 million in punitive damages over claims that an electronic defect in Bookout's 2005 Camry caused it to accelerate unintentionally and crash, seriously injuring Bookout and killing Schwartz.
- July 2015 - Beasley Allen represented the State of Alabama in a landmark agreement in principle with BP for damages caused by the April 2010 Deepwater Horizon oil spill in the Gulf of Mexico. The agreement tagged the State of Alabama to receive more than $2 billion in total, including compensation for economic losses resulting from the spill, natural resource damages, and an apportionment of Clean Water Act civil fines and penalties. The agreement is part of a larger agreement that includes the Federal Government, four other Gulf States impacted by the oil spill –Louisiana, Texas, Mississippi and Florida – and local government entities. The deal is estimated to be worth approximately $18.7 billion, and should smash previous records as the largest environmental settlement in U.S. history.

=== Community involvement ===
Beasley is actively involved various civic endeavors, including the American Cancer Society, American Heart Association, Lions Club and the Fellowship of Christian Athletes.

He is a member of the Staff Parish Relations for St. James United Methodist Church.

In 2006, Beasley was named “Citizen of the Year” by the March of Dimes.

In May 2018, Beasley was selected as the recipient of the Montgomery Sunrise Rotary Club’s public service achievement and contribution award, recognizing his dedication to helping others and improving the community and the River Region.

In 2018, Beasley Allen Law Firm was awarded the Montgomery Area Chamber of Commerce's Montgomery Impact Maker Award for its revitalization efforts in downtown Montgomery and its overall contribution to the local community. The firm was instrumental in securing the Montgomery Biscuits minor league baseball team and for providing the land for the Montgomery Riverwalk Stadium, which was respectfully constructed by preserving a large section of the original historic building and built on land owned by the firm. When the stadium opened in 2004, it catalyzed downtown revitalization.

In 2018, the firm was also awarded the Landmarks Foundation of Montgomery's James L. Loeb Preservation Award for its contribution to preserving Montgomery's historic resources and heritage, specifically capitalizing on the distinctive architectural character of lower Commerce Street. The firm has purchased and renovated several buildings along Commerce Street, which was added to the National Register of Historic Places in 1979 with boundary expansions in 1982 and 1987.

In January 2020, Beasley received the Montgomery County Bar Association (MCBA) Service & Achievement Award. The award was created to recognize Montgomery lawyers who have distinguished themselves through their exemplary service to the local community and bar. The honor is presented to a lawyer who demonstrates the highest standard of professionalism and is respected for outstanding legal ability.

== Electoral history ==
Democratic primary for Lieutenant Governor, 1970

- Jere Beasley – 256,081 (29.03%)
- Hugh Morrow – 185,333 (21.01%)
- Tom Radney – 163,462 (18.53%)
- Joe Money – 100,131 (11.35%)
- Jack Giles – 81,789 (9.27%)
- Joe Goodwyn – 75,085 (8.51%)
- James Gullate – 10,627 (1.21%)
- Jay Thomas – 9,631 (1.09%)

Democratic runoff for Lieutenant Governor

- Jere Beasley – 572,258 (57.78%)
- Hugh Morrow – 418,228 (42.23%)

Race for Lieutenant Governor, 1970

- Jere Beasley (D) – 589,618 (72.26%)
- Robert French (R) – 126,506 (15.50%)
- Isaiah Hayes (Alabama National Democrat) – 92,176 (11.30%)
- John G. Crommelin (Independent) – 7,678 (0.94%)

Democratic primary for Lieutenant Governor, 1974

- Charles Woods – 310,351 (38.68%)
- Jere Beasley (inc.) – 308,182 (38.41%)
- Richard Dominick – 150,455 (18.75%)
- Ron Creel – 25,392 (3.17%)
- Coleman Brown – 7,943 (0.99%)

Democratic runoff for Lieutenant Governor

- Jere Beasley (inc.) – 393,077 (56.10%)
- Charles Woods – 307,643 (43.90%)

Race for Lieutenant Governor, 1974

- Jere Beasley (D) (inc.) – 433,495 (72.06%)
- Don Collins (R) – 153,814 (25.57%)
- Edna L. Bowling (Prohibition) – 9,857 (1.64%)
- John Watts (Independent, write-in) – 4,387 (0.73%)

Democratic primary for Governor, 1978

- Fob James – 256,196 (28.47%)
- Bill Baxley – 210,089 (23.35%)
- Albert Brewer – 193,479 (21.50%)
- Sid McDonald – 143,930 (15.99%)
- Jere Beasley – 77,202 (8.58%)
- K.C. Foster – 4,948 (0.55%)
- Horace Howell – 4,730 (0.53%)
- Jim Folsom – 4,632 (0.52%)
- Bob Muncaster – 1,776 (0.20%)
- Shorty Price – 1,396 (0.16%)
- Charles Woods – 700 (0.08%)
- Fred Sandefer – 622 (0.07%)
- Cornelia Wallace – 217 (0.02%)

== See also ==
- List of Auburn University people

== Notes ==
Party political offices
Preceded by Albert Brewer	Democratic nominee for Lieutenant Governor of Alabama; 1970, 1974	Succeeded by George McMillan
Political offices
Preceded by Albert Brewer	Lieutenant Governor of Alabama; 1971–1979	Succeeded by George McMillan
Preceded by George Wallace	Governor of Alabama; Acting; 1972; During; George Wallace's incapacitation	Succeeded by George Wallace
