= Pierre Pelham =

American politician

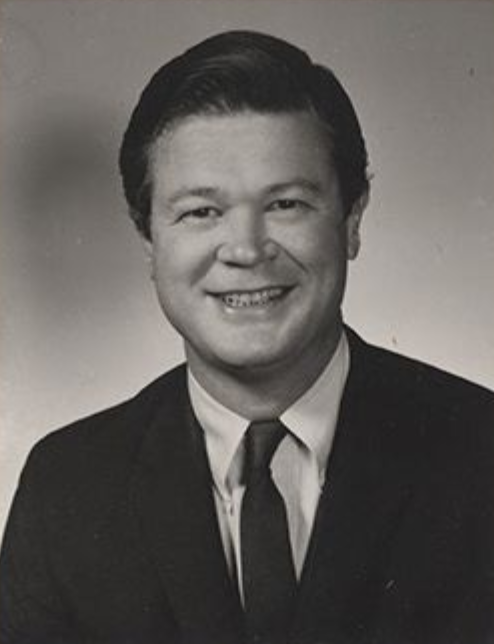

Member of the Alabama Senate
- In office 1966–1974
- Constituency: 24th

Personal details
- Born: July 20, 1929 Chatom, Alabama, U.S.
- Died: December 3, 2009 (aged 80)
- Party: Democratic
- Education: University of Alabama; Harvard Law School

Pierre Pelham (July 20, 1929 – December 3, 2009) was an American politician. He served as a Democratic member of the Alabama Senate from 1966 to 1974. He served as president pro tempore from 1970 to 1974.
