= Tom Radney =

American politician (1932–2011)

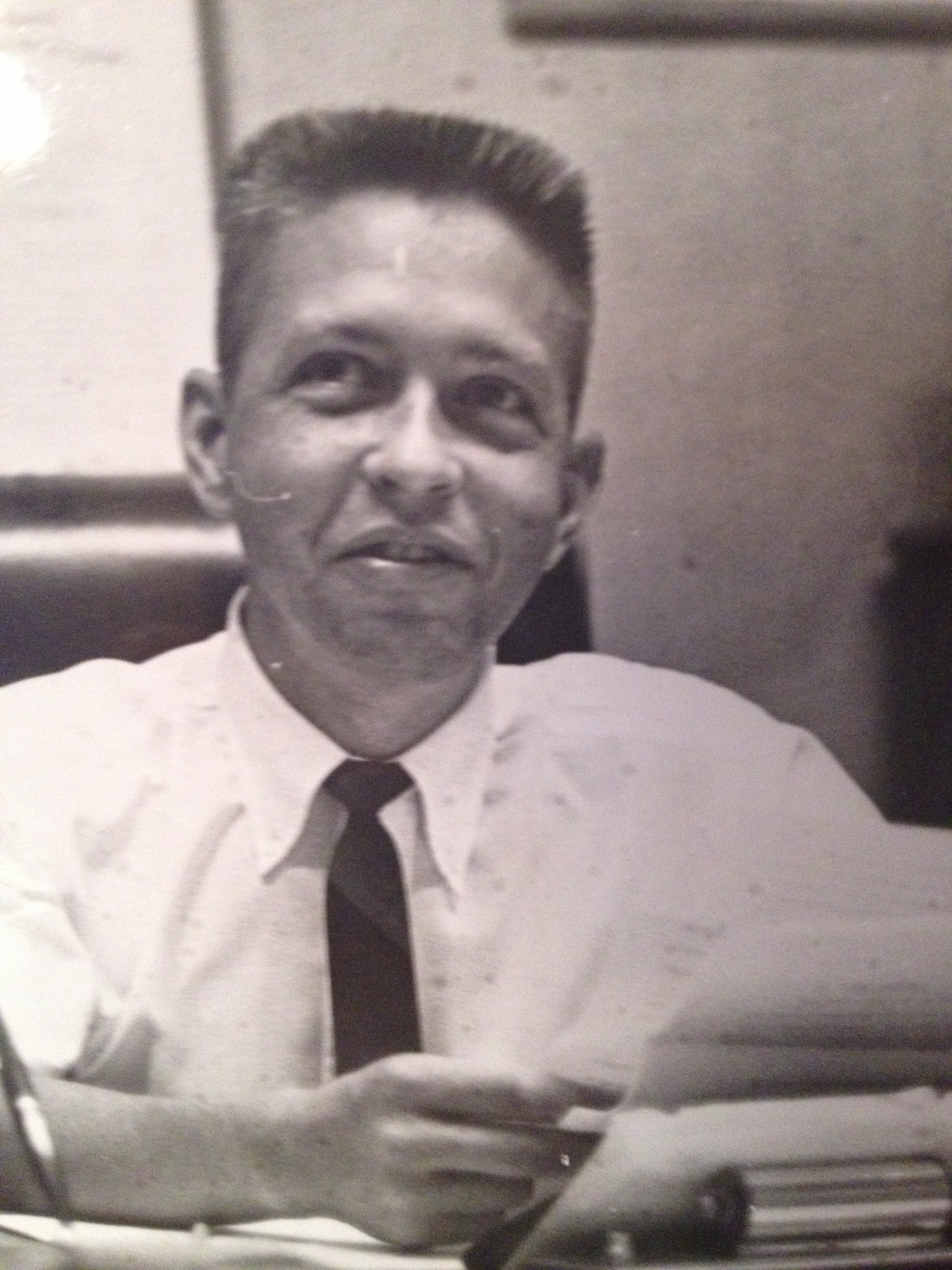

Member of the Alabama Senate
- In office 1966–1970
- Constituency: 16th

Personal details
- Born: John Tomas Radney; June 18, 1932 Wadley, Randolph County, Alabama, U.S.
- Died: August 7, 2011 (aged 79)
- Party: Democratic
- Education: Auburn University; University of Alabama School of Law

Military service
- Allegiance: United States of America
- Branch/service: United States Army
- Years of service: Korean War
- Unit: Judge Advocate General's Corps

John Tomas Radney (June 18, 1932 – August 7, 2011) was an American attorney and Democratic politician.

== Early and family life ==
Born in Wadley, Randolph County, Alabama during the Great Depression, With his older brother Hugh Radney paying his way by working on the family farm, Radney graduated from Auburn University, where he was a member of the Phi Kappa Tau fraternity, receiving a bachelor of science in education, then a master's degree in history in 1952. He received his law degree from University of Alabama School of Law in 1955. Radney served in the Judge Advocate General's Corps, United States Army during the Korean War.

In 1962, he married the former Madolyn Anderson, whose father had served in the Alabama Legislature. During their 49 years of marriage, they raised three daughters (Ellen Radney Price, Fran Radney Harvey and Hollis Radney Lovett) and a son, Thomas (Catie) Anderson Radney.

== Career ==
Radney established a law office in Alexander City, the largest city in the area. He had a legal practice both civil and criminal encompassing several surrounding counties. He also served as a municipal judge in Alexander City. Radney also served as President of the Board of Trustees at Alabama State University and of the Alexander City Chamber of Commerce, as well as on the boards of trustees or directors of Huntington College, Carraway Methodist Hospital in Birmingham, and Russell Medical Center and the First Methodist Church in Alexander City. Radney was also active in the American Legion, Junior Chamber of Commerce, Kiwanis Club of Alexander City, Elks Lodge, and Masons.

A liberal Democrat, Radney became President of the Tallapoosa County Young Democrats and won election to the Alabama State Senate in 1966. He served from 1967 until 1971. A firm supporter of John F. Kennedy despite Massive Resistance in Alabama, Radney maintained strong loyalty to the Kennedys as a Democratic Party delegate. After his support for Senator Ted Kennedy during the 1968 Democratic National Convention in Chicago prompted death threats against him and his family, Radney announced that he would retire from politics following the expiration of his state senate term. Despite this pledge, Radney ran for Lieutenant Governor of Alabama in 1970 but lost and returned to his legal practice. He remained active in his political party as a mentor to younger politicians and a long-time member of the Alabama Democratic Executive Committee. On January 16, 2003, Alabama governor Don Siegelman declared "Tom Radney Day" and dozens of prominent Democrats attended Radney's receipt of the declaration, including former senator Howell Heflin and former congressman Ronnie Flippo. Radney had championed a rule which prevented candidates from running as a Democrat who had not supported the party's nominees in the previous four years.". He cherished the nickname "Mr. Alabama Democrat", particularly after Governor George Wallace left the party.
