= 1982 Alabama Senate election =

- November 2, 1982

All 35 seats in the Alabama State Senate 18 seats needed for a majority
- Turnout: 37.48%
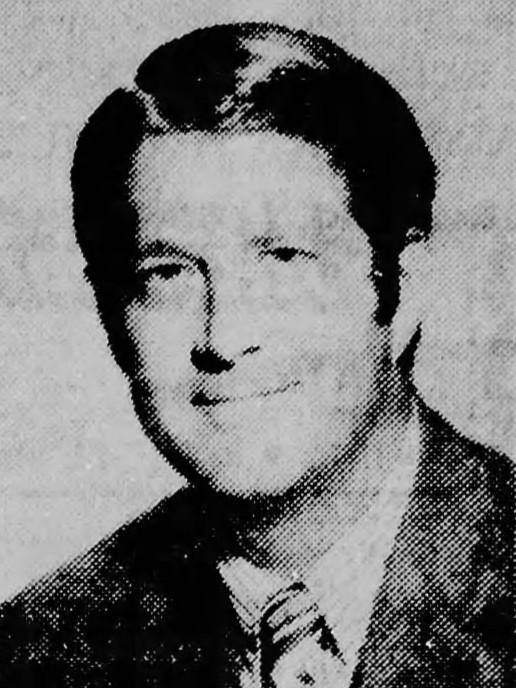

	Majority party	Minority party
Leader	Finis St. John III (did not stand)	—
Party	Democratic	Republican
Leader since	January 9, 1979	—
Leader's seat	4th–Cullman	—
Last election	35 seats, 68.9%	0 seats, 30.4%
Seats before	35	0
Seats won	32	3
Seat change	▼3	▲3
Popular vote	683,395	115,303
Percentage	85.37%	14.40%
- District results Democratic: 50–60% 60–70% 70–80% 80–90% 90–100% Unopposed; Republican: 50–60% 60–70%
President pro tempore before election
Finis St. John
Democratic
Elected President pro tempore
Democratic

The 1982 Alabama Senate election took place on Tuesday, November 2, 1982, to elect 35 representatives to serve four-year terms in the Alabama Senate. Primary elections were held on September 7 with runoff elections on September 28. The state's three Black senators, Michael Figures, Earl Hilliard, and J. Richmond Pearson, all won re-election. The Republicans won three seats at the general election, its best showing of the entire century up to that point.

This was the first time a Republican had been elected to the state senate since Leland Childs was elected in 1966, who himself had been the first Republican elected to the chamber since the Reconstruction Era. The Republicans also made history by electing Ann Bedsole of Mobile to District 34, the state's first-ever female state senator. Across both houses, Republicans were elected to 11 of the 140 legislative seats, the most since Reconstruction.

Democrat John Teague was unanimously elected President pro tempore on January 11, 1983. The map used in the 1982 general election was struck down the next year for violating the Voting Rights Act of 1965, requiring a new map to be drawn. A special election for every seat in the legislature was held in November 1983.

== Summary ==
Party	Candidates			Seats		
Party	Num.	Vote	%	Before	Won	+/–
Democratic	35	683,395	85.37%	35	32	▼3
Republican	10	115,303	14.40%	0	3	▲3
NDPA	1	1,734	0.22%	0	0	Steady
Write-in		42	0.01%	—	0	Steady
Total	46	800,474	100%	35		Steady
Registered / turnout		2,135,724	37.48			

== Incumbents ==
=== Won re-election ===
- District 1: Bobby E. Denton (Democratic) won re-election.
- District 7: Bill Smith (Democratic) won re-election.
- District 9: Hinton Mitchem (Democratic) won re-election.
- District 10: Larry Keener (Democratic) won re-election.
- District 13: J. Richmond Pearson (Democratic) won re-election.
- District 14: Mac Parsons (Democratic) won re-election.
- District 15: Earl Hilliard (Democratic) won re-election. Hilliard succeeded Democratic senator U. W. Clemon after a September 1980 special election.
- District 16: Ryan deGraffenried (Democratic) won re-election.
- District 18: Lister Proctor (Democratic) won re-election.
- District 19: John Teague (Democratic) won re-election.
- District 20: Donald Holmes (Democratic) won re-election.
- District 21: T. D. Little (Democratic) won re-election.
- District 24: Chip Bailey (Democratic) won re-election.
- District 26: Don Harrison (Democratic) won re-election.
- District 29: Earl Goodwin (Democratic) won re-election.
- District 30: Edward Robertson (Democratic) won re-election.
- District 31: Reo Kirkland Jr. (Democratic) won re-election.
- District 33: Michael Figures (Democratic) won re-election.

=== Eliminated in primary ===
- District 8: James Lemaster (Democratic) lost renomination to Lowell Barron.
- District 17: Doug Cook (Democratic) lost renomination to Lucile White.
- District 22: G. J. Higginbotham (Democratic) lost renomination to Danny Corbett.
- District 23: Mike Weeks (Democratic) lost renomination to Foy Covington Jr.
- District 25: Wallace Miller (Democratic) lost renomination to Crum Foshee.
- District 27: Barry Teague (Democratic) lost renomination to Larry Dixon. Teague succeeded Democratic senator Bishop Barron after an April 1982 special election.
- District 28: Cordy Taylor (Democratic) lost renomination to Wendell Mitchell.
- District 32: Bob Gulledge (Democratic) lost renomination to Jerry Boyington, who was subsequently defeated by Republican Perry Hand.

=== Did not seek re-election ===
- District 2: Charlie Britnell (Democratic) did not seek re-election.
- District 3: Charles Martin (Democratic) was elected to the 8th state house district.
- District 4: Finis St. John III (Democratic) did not seek re-election.
- District 5: Robert Hall (Democratic) did not seek re-election.
- District 6: Albert McDonald (Democratic) was elected agriculture commissioner.
- District 11: Dewey White (Democratic) did not seek re-election.
- District 12: Pat Vacca (Democratic) did not seek re-election.
- District 34: Sonny Callahan (Democratic) unsuccessfully ran for lieutenant governor.
- District 35: Bob Glass (Democratic) did not seek re-election.

== General election results ==
District	Democratic			Republican			Others			Total		
District	Candidate	Votes	%	Candidate	Votes	%	Candidate	Votes	%	Votes	Maj.	Mrg.
11th	Roger Lee	13,093	34.57%	William J. Cabaniss	24,786	65.43%	—	—	—	37,879	−11,693	−30.87%
12th	John Amari	20,892	76.46%	Red Walker	6,433	23.54%	—	—	—	27,325	+14,459	+52.91%
17th	Dale Corley	11,953	33.67%	Spencer Bachus	23,543	66.33%	—	—	—	35,496	−11,590	−32.65%
20th	Donald G. Holmes (inc.)	18,949	76.98%	Charles H. Green	5,667	23.02%	—	—	—	24,616	+13,282	+53.96%
22nd	Danny Corbett	14,803	67.31%	Sam Pierce	7,181	32.65%	Write-in	8	0.04%	21,992	+7,622	+34.66%
23rd	Foy Covington	23,928	84.71%	Chris Bence	2,584	9.15%	Bill Johnston (NDPA)	1,734	6.14%	28,246	+21,344	+75.56%
29th	Earl Goodwin (inc.)	25,733	82.93%	John J. Grimes Jr.	5,293	17.06%	Write-in	1	0.01%	31,027	+20,440	+65.88%
32nd	Jerry Boyington	16,519	55.68%	Perry Hand	13,149	44.32%	—	—	—	29,668	+3,370	+11.36%
34th	John E. Saad	15,368	48.08%	Ann Bedsole	16,596	51.92%	Jean Sullivan (write-in)	2	0.01%	31,966	−1,228	−3.84%
35th	Bill Menton	13,008	56.36%	Gary Tanner	10,071	43.64%	—	—	—	23,079	+2,937	+12.73%

=== Elected unopposed ===
- District 1: Bobby E. Denton (Democratic, inc.) received 25,168 votes.
- District 2: Roger Bedford (Democratic) received 26,316 votes.
- District 3: Gary Aldridge (Democratic) received 19,569 votes. 2 write-in votes were recorded.
- District 4: Steve Cooley (Democratic) received 21,249 votes.
- District 5: Charles Bishop (Democratic) received 16,494 votes.
- District 6: Jim Smith (Democratic) received 18,426 votes.
- District 7: Bill Smith (Democratic, inc.) received 18,686 votes.
- District 8: Lowell Barron (Democratic) received 19,866 votes. 1 write-in vote was recorded.
- District 9: Hinton Mitchem (Democratic, inc.) received 19,485 votes. 1 write-in vote was recorded.
- District 10: Larry Keener (Democratic, inc.) received 25,129 votes.
- District 13: J. Richmond Pearson (Democratic, inc.) received 21,315 votes.
- District 14: Mac Parsons (Democratic) received 20,561 votes.
- District 15: Earl Hilliard (Democratic, inc.) received 15,988 votes.
- District 16: Ryan deGraffenried (Democratic, inc.) received 20,149 votes.
- District 18: Lister Hill Proctor (Democratic, inc.) received 19,399 votes.
- District 19: John Teague (Democratic, inc.) received 22,086 votes. 1 write-in vote was recorded.
- District 21: T. D. Little (Democratic, inc.) received 18,270 votes.
- District 24: Chip Bailey (Democratic, inc.) received 16,273 votes.
- District 25: Crum Foshee (Democratic) received 20,331 votes. 2 write-in votes were recorded.
- District 26: Don Harrison (Democratic, inc.) received 20,680 votes. 2 write-in votes were recorded.
- District 27: Larry Dixon (Democratic) received 23,305 votes. 4 write-in votes were recorded.
- District 28: Wendell Mitchell (Democratic) received 22,537 votes.
- District 30: Edward Robertson (Democratic, inc.) received 24,515 votes. 18 write-in votes were recorded.
- District 31: Reo Kirkland Jr. (Democratic, inc.) received 18,105 votes.
- District 33: Michael Figures (Democratic, inc.) received 15,247 votes.

== Democratic primary elections ==
=== Runoff results by district ===
Candidates in boldface advanced to the general election. An asterisk (*) denotes a runoff winner who was the runner-up in the first round.

District	Winner			Loser			Total		
District	Candidate	Votes	%	Candidate	Votes	%	Votes	Maj.	Mrg.
2nd	**Roger Bedford**	22,365	55.33%	Robbie Martin	18,056	44.67%	40,421	+4,309	+10.66%
3rd	**Gary Aldridge**	14,208	50.16%	Ray Campbell	14,117	49.84%	28,325	+91	+0.32%
8th	**Lowell Barron**	13,618	50.65%	James Lemaster (inc.)	13,268	49.35%	26,886	+350	+1.30%
22nd	**Danny Corbett***	10,753	53.54%	G. J. Higginbotham (inc.)	9,330	46.46%	20,083	+1,423	+7.09%
23rd	**Foy Covington Jr.**	16,762	56.86%	Boyd Whigham	12,719	43.14%	29,481	+4,043	+13.71%
29th	**Earl Goodwin (inc.)***	17,264	51.10%	Hank Sanders	16,522	48.90%	33,786	+742	+2.20%
35th	**Bill Menton**	9,688	53.11%	George Stewart	8,553	46.89%	18,241	+1,135	+6.22%

=== First round results by district ===
Candidates in boldface advanced to either the general election or a runoff, first-place winners with an asterisk (*) did not face a runoff.

District	First place			Runners-up			Others			Total		
District	Candidate	Votes	%	Candidate	Votes	%	Candidate	Votes	%	Votes	Maj.	Mrg.
2nd	**Roger Bedford**	15,793	39.41%	**Robbie Martin**	**12,672**	**31.62%**	2 others (Note: David Sibley: 10,002 votes, 24.96%; Louise Watley: 1,605 votes, 4.01%)	11,607	28.97%	4,0072	+3,121	+7.79%
3rd	**Gary Aldridge**	11,482	49.30%	**Ray Campbell**	**9,991**	**42.89%**	Gary Peters	1,819	7.81%	23,292	+1,491	+6.40%
4th	**Steve Cooley***	11,837	65.63%	Murray A. Battles	6,198	34.37%	—	—	—	18,035	+5,639	+31.27%
5th	**Charles Bishop***	10,182	53.51%	Johnny Howell	5,306	27.88%	Bill Kitchens	3,541	18.61%	19,029	+4,876	+25.62%
7th	**Bill Smith (inc.)***	11,155	59.42%	Jim Gaines	7,618	40.58%	—	—	—	18,773	+3,537	+18.84%
8th	**Lowell Barron**	8,393	34.28%	**James Lemaster (inc.)**	**8,099**	**33.08%**	Buck Watson	7,992	32.64%	24,484	+294	+1.20%
10th	**Larry Keener (inc.)***	15,952	50.82%	Barbara Bryant	7,940	25.29%	2 others (Note: Riley Whitaker: 5,181 votes, 16.50%; Theo Steed: 2,319 votes, 7.39%)	7,500	23.89%	31,392	+8,012	+25.52%
12th	**John Amari***	12,582	57.56%	Bob Gafford	9,278	42.44%	—	—	—	21,860	+3,304	+15.11%
17th	**Lucile White***	11,015	51.78%	Bob Cook (inc.)	10,257	48.22%	—	—	—	21,272	+758	+3.56%
20th	**Donald Holmes (inc.)***	14,697	63.83%	Tom Shelton	5,149	22.36%	2 others (Note: Jim Reid: 1,786 votes, 7.76%; Sara Grant: 1,392 votes, 6.05%)	3,178	13.80%	23,024	+9,548	+41.47%
22nd	**G. J. Higginbotham (inc.)**	7,878	38.84%	**Danny Corbett**	**7,127**	**35.13%**	2 others (Note: Bowen Brassell: 4,787 votes, 23.60%; H. H. Webb: 493 votes, 2.43%)	5,280	26.03%	20,285	+751	+3.70%
23rd	**Foy Covington**	7,150	22.99%	**Boyd Whigham**	**6,946**	**22.33%**	3 others (Note: Calvin D. Biggers: 6,918 votes, 22.24%; Mike Weeks (inc.): 6,209 votes, 19.96%; Bubber Hall: 3,884 votes, 12.49%)	17,011	54.69%	31,107	+204	+0.66%
24th	**Chip Bailey (inc.)***	16,998	66.97%	Matt Bullard	8,382	33.03%	—	—	—	25,380	+8,616	+33.95%
25th	**Crum Foshee***	15,244	50.32%	Wallace Miller (inc.)	15,050	49.68%	—	—	—	30,294	+194	+0.64%
26th	**Don Harrison (inc.)***	10,665	53.73%	John M. Smith	5,995	30.20%	Walter Daniel	3,188	16.06%	19,848	+4,670	+23.53%
27th	**Larry Dixon***	13,994	52.27%	Barry Teague (inc.)	12,778	47.73%	—	—	—	26,772	+1,216	+4.54%
28th	**Wendell Mitchell***	14,985	53.58%	Cordy Taylor (inc.)	6,199	22.16%	2 others (Note: Jack Crawford: 3,542 votes, 12.66%; Chuck Heartsill: 3,244 votes, 11.60%)	6,786	24.26%	27,970	+8,786	+31.41%
29th	**Hank Sanders**	13,139	38.95%	**Earl Goodwin (inc.)**	**10,633**	**31.52%**	Leigh Pegues	9,958	29.52%	33,730	+2,506	+7.43%
30th	**Ed Robertson (inc.)***	17,164	52.35%	Bert Bank	15,625	47.65%	—	—	—	32,789	+1,539	+4.69%
31st	**Reo Kirkland Jr. (inc.)***	16,149	52.73%	J. W. Sales	8,656	28.27%	J. W. Owens	5,819	19.00%	30,624	+7,493	+24.47%
32nd	**Jerry Boyington***	12,604	60.15%	Bob Gulledge (inc.)	8,351	39.85%	—	—	—	20,955	+4,253	+20.30%
33rd	**Michael Figures (inc.)***	12,999	61.92%	John A. Sanderson	7,994	38.08%	—	—	—	20,993	+5,005	+23.84%
34th	**John Saad***	17,338	77.75%	Gary P. Alidor	4,962	22.25%	—	—	—	22,300	+12,376	+55.50%
35th	**Bill Menton**	7,588	40.93%	**George Stewart**	**5,184**	**27.97%**	2 others (Note: John Hester: 4,108 votes, 22.16%; John Ellisor: 1,657 votes, 8.94%)	5,765	31.10	18,537	+2,404	+12.97%

=== Nominated unopposed ===
The following candidates won the Democratic nomination by default as they were the only to run in their respective district:

- District 1: Bobby E. Denton
- District 6: Jim Smith (inc.)
- District 9: Hinton Mitchem (inc.)
- District 11: Roger Lee
- District 13: J. Richmond Pearson (inc.)
- District 14: Mac Parsons
- District 15: Earl Hilliard (inc.)
- District 16: Ryan deGraffenried (inc.)
- District 18: Lister Hill Proctor (inc.)
- District 19: John Teague (inc.)
- District 21: T. D. Little (inc.)

== Republican primary election ==
Only District 17, consisting of portions of Jefferson and Shelby counties, saw more than one candidate run in the Republican primary.

=== District 17 (Jefferson–Shelby) ===
District 17 Republican primary
Party	Candidate	Votes	%
Republican	Spencer Bachus	1,180	68.21%
Republican	Gilbert F. Douglas III	550	31.79%
Total votes		1,730	100.00%

=== Nominated unopposed ===
The following candidates won the Republican nomination by default as they were the only to run in their respective district:

- District 11: William J. Cabaniss
- District 12: Red Walker
- District 20: Charles H. Green
- District 22: Sam Pierce
- District 23: Chris Bence
- District 27: Jim Pugh (withdrew before general election.)
- District 29: John J. Grimes Jr.
- District 31: Larry Howard (withdrew before general election.)
- District 32: Perry Hand
- District 33: John W. Goss (withdrew before general election.)
- District 34: Ann Bedsole
- District 35: Gary Tanner

=== Withdrew before the primaries ===
The following candidates withdrew before their respective primaries:

- District 12: Jim Harris
- District 17: Jack Wright
- District 26: Mike Kolen

== Other candidates ==
Only one third-party candidate appeared on a state senate ballot. W. D. "Bill" Johnston ran as the nominee of the National Democratic Party of Alabama in Senate District 23, consisting of Bullock, Macon, Pike, and portions of Barbour, Dale, and Henry counties.

One independent candidate, Jean Sullivan of Mobile, failed to qualify for the District 34 race. Sullivan was a Republican National Committeewoman and had come close to winning an August 1976 special election in Senate District 29 as a Republican, losing by a margin of less than one percentage point. She decided to mount a write-in campaign and attended a candidate forum on October 27. Sullivan won two votes according to the official results.

== 1979–1982 special elections ==
=== District 15 ===
A special election for District 15, in Birmingham, was triggered after incumbent Democratic senator U. W. Clemon resigned on June 30, 1980, after being appointed to a federal judgeship. With no Republican or independent candidates, the election was decided in the Democratic primary between state representatives Earl Hilliard and Tony Harrison, and dentist T. L. Alexander. Hilliard won a majority of votes in the first round of the Democratic primary, so no runoff was necessary. Both Clemon and his successor were Black.

1980 Alabama Senate District 15 special Democratic primary September 2, 1980
Party	Candidate	Votes	%
Democratic	Earl Hilliard	4,710	55.71%
Democratic	Tony Harrison	2,126	25.15%
Democratic	T. L. Alexander	1,619	19.15%
Total votes		8,455	100.00%
Democratic hold			

1980 Alabama Senate District 15 special election November 4, 1980
Party	Candidate	Votes	%
Democratic	Earl Hilliard	Unopp.	
Democratic hold			

=== District 27 ===
A special election for District 27, in Montgomery, was triggered after incumbent Democratic senator Bishop Berry resigned after being appointed to the Alabama Court of Criminal Appeals. Although state representative Larry Dixon was the preferred candidate of the county Democratic executive committee, former U.S. Attorney Barry Teague was nominated over Dixon by the state Democratic Executive Committee after a mail-in vote in early 1982. The Republican Party failed to nominate a candidate, and Teague's only opposition in the general election was the Alabama Conservative Party's Gordon Tucker, who was the Republican Party nominee for President of the Public Service Commission in 1980.

1982 Alabama Senate District 27 special convention March 1982
Party	Candidate	Votes	%
Democratic	Barry Teague	78	77.23%
Democratic	Larry Dixon	23	22.77%
Total votes		101	100.00%
Democratic hold			

1982 Alabama Senate District 27 special election April 6, 1982
Party	Candidate	Votes	%
Democratic	Barry Teague	2,403	76.48%
Alabama Conservative	Gordon Tucker	739	23.52%
Total votes		3,142	100.00%
Democratic hold			

== See also ==
- Category:1982 elections in Alabama
  - 1982 United States House of Representatives elections in Alabama
  - 1982 Alabama gubernatorial election
- 1982 United States elections
