= 1978 Alabama Senate election =

- November 8, 1978

All 35 seats in the Alabama State Senate 18 seats needed for a majority
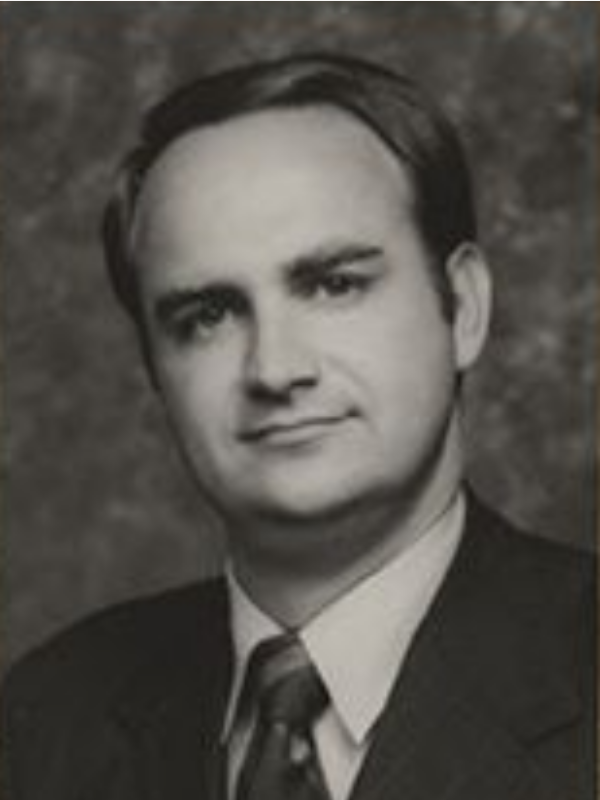

	Majority party	Minority party
Leader	Joe Fine (retired)	—
Party	Democratic	Republican
Leader since	January 14, 1975	—
Leader's seat	2nd–Franklin	—
Last election	35 seats, 92.75%	0 seats, 3.03%
Seats before	34	0
Seats won	35	0
Seat change	▲1	Steady
Popular vote	126,341 (Note: Does not include uncontested seats.)	55,814
Percentage	68.91%	30.44%
	Third party
Party	Independent
Last election	0 seats, 1.09%
Seats before	1
Seats won	0
Seat change	▼1
Popular vote	1,183
Percentage	0.65%
- District results Democratic: 50–60% 60–70% 70–80% 80–90% 90–100% Unopposed
President pro tempore before election
Joe Fine
Democratic
Elected President pro tempore
Finis St. John
Democratic

The 1978 Alabama Senate election took place on Tuesday, November 8, 1978, to elect 35 representatives to serve four-year terms in the Alabama Senate. While 35 districts were up for election, only nine saw Republican opposition. Both of the state's Black senators, U. W. Clemon and J. Richmond Pearson, won re-election, with the newly elected Michael Figures joining their ranks.

Primary elections were held on September 5, with runoffs on September 26. This election used the same legislative map as was used in 1974, utilizing single-member districts.

Incumbent president pro tempore Joe Fine did not run for another term, instead opting for an attorney general campaign, which was unsuccessful. Finis St. John was unanimously elected president on January 9, 1979.

== Summary ==
Party	Candidates			Seats			
Party	Num.	Vote	%	1974	Before	Won	+/–
Democratic	35	126,341	68.91%	35	34	35	▲1
Republican	9	55,814	30.44%	0	0	0	Steady
Independents	1	1,183	0.65%	0	1	0	▼1
Total	45	183,338	100%	35			Steady

=== By district ===
†: Incumbent did not run for reelection. ‡: Lost re-election.

District	Incumbent	Party	Elected senator	Party
1st	Oscar Peden‡ (Note: Since a February 1977 special election)	Ind (Note: Ran for re-election as a Democrat)	Bobby Denton	Dem
2nd	Joe Fine†	Dem	Charlie Britnell	Dem
3rd	Bingham Edwards†	Dem	Charles Martin	Dem
4th	Finis St. John	Dem	Finis St. John	Dem
5th	Robert Wilson†	Dem	Bob Hall	Dem
6th	Albert McDonald	Dem	Albert McDonald	Dem
7th	Bill King†	Dem	Bill Smith	Dem
8th	John Baker†	Dem	James Lemaster	Dem
9th	Sid McDonald†	Dem	Hinton Mitchem	Dem
10th	Gerald Waldrop‡	Dem	Larry Keener	Dem
11th	George McMillan†	Dem	Dewey White	Dem
12th	Pat Vacca	Dem	Pat Vacca	Dem
13th	J. Richmond Pearson	Dem	J. Richmond Pearson	Dem
14th	Bob Ellis‡	Dem	Mac Parsons	Dem
15th	U. W. Clemon	Dem	U. W. Clemon	Dem
16th	Richard Shelby†	Dem	Ryan deGraffenried	Dem
17th	Eddie Hubert Gilmore†	Dem	Doug Cook	Dem
18th	Lester Hill Proctor	Dem	Lester Hill Proctor	Dem
19th	John Teague	Dem	John Teague	Dem
20th	Donald Stewart†	Dem	Donald Holmes	Dem
21st	Ted Little	Dem	Ted Little	Dem
22nd	G. J. Higginbotham (Note: Since a February 1977 special election)	Dem	G. J. Higginbotham	Dem
23th	T. Dudley Perry†	Dem	Mike Weeks	Dem
24th	Sam Adams†	Dem	Chip Bailey	Dem
25th	Crum Foshee† (Note: Since being reinstated in March 1978)	Dem	Wallace Miller	Dem
26th	Jerry Powell‡	Dem	Don Harrison	Dem
27th	Fred Jones†	Dem	Bishop N. Barron	Dem
28th	Wendell Mitchell†	Dem	Cordy Taylor	Dem
29th	Earl Goodwin (Note: Since an August 1976 special election)	Dem	Earl Goodwin	Dem
30th	Bert Bank†	Dem	Edward Robertson	Dem
31st	Maston Mims†	Dem	Reo Kirkland Jr.	Dem
32nd	Dick Owen‡	Dem	Bob Gulledge	Dem
33rd	Mike Perloff‡	Dem	Michael Figures	Dem
34th	L. W. Noonan†	Dem	Sonny Callahan	Dem
35th	Bill Roberts†	Dem	Bob Glass	Dem

== Incumbents ==
=== Successfully sought re-election ===
- District 4: Finis St. John (Democratic)
- District 6: Albert McDonald (Democratic)
- District 12: Pat Vacca (Democratic)
- District 13: J. Richmond Pearson (Democratic)
- District 15: U. W. Clemon (Democratic)
- District 18: Lester Hill Proctor (Democratic)
- District 19: John Teague (Democratic)
- District 21: Ted Little (Democratic)
- District 22: G. J. Higginbotham (Democratic)
- District 29: Earl Goodwin (Democratic)

=== Lost re-election ===
- District 1: Oscar Peden (Independent) ran for re-election as a Democrat and lost the nomination to Bobby Denton.
- District 10: Gerald Waldrop (Democratic) lost re-nomination to Larry Keener.
- District 14: Bob Ellis (Democratic) lost re-nomination to Mac Parsons.
- District 26: Jerry Powell (Democratic) lost re-nomination to Don Harrison.
- District 32: Dick Owen (Democratic) lost re-nomination to Bob Gulledge.
- District 33: Mike Perloff (Democratic) lost re-nomination to Michael Figures.

=== Did not seek re-election ===
The following candidates retired or sought other offices:

- District 2: Joe Fine (Democratic) unsuccessfully ran for attorney general.
- District 3: Bingham Edwards (Democratic) retired.
- District 5: Bob Wilson (Democratic) retired.
- District 7: Bill King (Democratic) unsuccessfully ran for lieutenant governor.
- District 8: John Baker (Democratic) unsuccessfully ran in the U.S. Senate general election.
- District 9: Sid McDonald (Democratic) unsuccessfully ran for governor.
- District 11: George McMillan (Democratic) successfully ran for lieutenant governor.
- District 16: Richard Shelby (Democratic) successfully ran in Alabama's 7th congressional district.
- District 17: Eddie Hubert Gilmore (Democratic) retired.
- District 20: Donald Stewart (Democratic) successfully ran in the U.S. Senate special election.
- District 23: Dudley Perry (Democratic) unsuccessfully ran for attorney general.
- District 24: Sam Adams (Democratic) retired.
- District 25: Crum Foshee (Democratic) retired.
- District 27: Fred Jones (Democratic) retired.
- District 28: Wendell Mitchell (Democratic) unsuccessfully ran in Alabama's 2nd congressional district.
- District 30: Bert Bank (Democratic) unsuccessfully ran for lieutenant governor.
- District 31: Mastom Mims (Democratic) retired.
- District 34: Red Noonan (Democratic) unsuccessfully ran in Alabama's 1st congressional district.
- District 35: Bill Roberts (Democratic) unsuccessfully ran for lieutenant governor.

== General election results ==
District	Democratic			Republican			Independents			Total		
District	Candidate	Votes	%	Candidate	Votes	%	Candidate	Votes	%	Votes	Maj.	Mrg.
5th	Robert Hall	15,806	93.04%	—	—	—	Bill Kitchens	1,183	6.96%	16,989	+14,623	+86.07%
10th	Larry Keener	14,324	67.18%	Jimmy Dill	6,999	32.82%	—	—	—	21,323	+7,325	+34.35%
11th	Dewey White	16,300	70.56%	James K. Watley	6,801	29.44%	—	—	—	23,101	+9,499	+41.12%
12th	Pat Vacca (inc.)	12,299	53.81%	Evan Veal	10,557	46.19%	—	—	—	22,856	+1,742	+7.62%
18th	Lister Proctor (inc.)	13,565	66.76%	Tom Longshore	6,755	33.24%	—	—	—	20,320	+6,810	+33.51%
24th	Chip Bailey	10,183	62.05%	Richard A. Britt	6,228	37.95%	—	—	—	16,411	+3,955	+24.10%
26th	Don Harrison	15,526	77.30%	Bob E. Allen	4,560	22.70%	—	—	—	20,086	+10,966	+54.60%
27th	Bishop Barron	15,751	75.82%	Herbert Morton	5,023	24.18%	—	—	—	20,774	+10,728	+51.64%
33rd	Michael Figures	8,139	56.79%	James B. Norsworthy	6,193	43.21%	—	—	—	14,332	+1,946	+13.58%
35th	Bob Glass	4,448	62.24%	Danny Perry	2,698	37.76%	—	—	—	7,146	+1,750	+24.49%
Source: The Birmingham News

=== Elected unopposed ===
The following candidates did not see any competition in the general election:

- District 1: Bobby Denton (Democratic, inc.)
- District 2: Charlie Britnell (Democratic)
- District 3: Charles Martin (Democratic)
- District 4: Finis St. John (Democratic, inc.)
- District 6: Albert McDonald (Democratic, inc.)
- District 7: Bill Smith (Democratic)
- District 8: James Lemaster (Democratic)
- District 9: Hinton Mitchem (Democratic)
- District 13: J. Richmond Pearson (Democratic, inc.)
- District 14: Mac Parsons (Democratic)
- District 15: U. W. Clemon (Democratic, inc.)
- District 16: Ryan deGraffenried (Democratic)
- District 17: Doug Cook (Democratic)
- District 19: John Teague (Democratic, inc.)
- District 20: Donald Holmes (Democratic)
- District 21: Ted Little (Democratic, inc.)
- District 22: G. J. Higginbotham (Democratic, inc.)
- District 23: Mike Weeks (Democratic)
- District 25: Wallace Miller (Democratic)
- District 28: Cordy Taylor (Democratic)
- District 29: Earl Goodwin (Democratic, inc.)
- District 30: Edward Robertson (Democratic)
- District 31: Reo Kirkland Jr. (Democratic)
- District 32: Bob Gulledge (Democratic)
- District 34: Sonny Callahan (Democratic)

== Democratic primary results ==
Democrats contested every seat in the state senate. Of the 35 incumbent Democratic senators, only 16 sought election (46 percent). Of the 16 who sought re-election:

- 5 were re-nominated unopposed;
- 5 won their primaries;
- 6 lost their primaries.

=== Runoff results by district ===
Candidates in boldface advanced to the general election. An asterisk (*) denotes a runoff winner who was the runner-up in the first round.

District	Winner			Loser			Total		
District	Candidate	Votes	%	Candidate	Votes	%	Votes	Maj.	Mrg.
1st	**Bobby Denton**	15,490	56.02%	Oscar Peden (inc.)	12,162	43.98%	27,652	+3,328	+12.04%
2nd	**Charlie Britnell**	17,092	55.29%	Bo Renfroe	13,819	44.71%	30,911	+3,273	+10.59%
5th	**Bob Hall**	11,940	53.27%	Earl Lynn Barnett	10,474	46.73%	22,414	+1,466	+6.54%
8th	**James Lemaster**	22,727	68.50%	Roger Killian	10,451	31.50%	33,178	+12,276	+37.00%
14th	**Mac Parsons***	12,912	60.65%	Bob Ellis (inc.)	8,377	39.35%	21,289	+4,535	+21.30%
17th	**Doug Cook**	17,025	60.37%	Buddy Armstrong	11,178	39.63%	28,203	+5,847	+20.73%
19th	**John Teague (inc.)**	12,774	55.87%	Bill Atkinson	10,091	44.13%	22,865	+2,683	+11.73%
23rd	**Mike Weeks**	14,833	55.46%	Dale Segrest	11,914	44.54%	26,747	+2,919	+10.91%
24th	**Chip Bailey**	12,356	54.78%	Phillip Hamm	10,200	45.22%	22,556	+2,156	+9.56%
26th	**Don Harrison**	13,615	54.13%	Jerry Powell (inc.)	11,536	45.87%	25,151	+2,079	+8.27%
28th	**Cordy Taylor**	14,676	53.34%	Edward L. Turner	12,837	46.66%	27,513	+1,839	+6.68%
31st	**Reo Kirkland Jr.**	14,898	55.02%	Gene Garrett	12,181	44.98%	27,079	+2,717	+10.03%
32nd	**Bob Gulledge**	16,074	61.01%	Dick Owen (inc.)	10,273	38.99%	26,347	+5,801	+22.02%
Source: The Birmingham Post-Herald

=== First round results by district ===
Candidates in boldface advanced to either the general election or a runoff; first-place winners with an asterisk (*) did not face a runoff.

District	First place			Runners-up			Others			Total		
District	Candidate	Votes	%	Candidate	Votes	%	Candidate	Votes	%	Votes	Maj.	Mrg.
1st	**Bobby Denton**	9,837	39.81%	**Oscar Peden (inc.)**	**8,048**	**32.57%**	Bob Hill	6,825	27.62%	24,710	+1,789	+7.24%
2nd	**Charlie Britnell**	8,064	24.91%	**Bob Rentroe**	**7,259**	**22.42%**	3 others (Note: Jim McRae: 6,300, 19.46%; David M. Sibley: 5,744, 17.74%; A. W. Todd: 5,007, 15.47%)	17,051	52.67%	32,374	+805	+2.49%
3rd	**Charles Martin***	11,347	53.86%	Wesley Lavender	9,719	46.14%	—	—	—	21,066	+1,628	+7.73%
5th	**Bob Hall**	8,918	47.49%	**Earl Barnett**	**7,519**	**40.04%**	Buddy Todd	2,343	12.48%	18,780	+1,399	+7.45%
6th	**Albert McDonald (inc.)***	11,936	64.38%	Wayne Tidwell	6,603	35.62%	—	—	—	18,539	+5,333	+28.77%
7th	**Bill Smith***	11,213	63.72%	Loretta Spencer	6,383	36.28%	—	—	—	17,596	+4,830	+27.45%
8th	**James Lemaster**	4,712	21.67%	**Roger Killian**	**4,613**	**21.22%**	4 others (Note: John Robinson: 4,049, 18.62%; Johnny Robinson: 3,028, 13.93%; Bill Freeman: 2,677, 12.31%; Bill Inman: 2,664, 12.25%)	12,418	57.11%	21,743	+99	+0.46%
10th	**Larry Keener***	13,942	53.42%	Gerald Waldrop (inc.)	8,538	32.72%	Retha Deal Wynot	3,617	13.86%	26,097	+5,404	+20.71%
11th	**Dewey White***	12,102	81.61%	A. A. Kelley	2,727	18.39%	—	—	—	14,829	+9,375	+63.22%
14th	**Bob Ellis (inc.)**	6,088	38.30%	**Mac Parsons**	**5,908**	**37.17%**	2 others (Note: Pud Morrison: 2,650, 16.67%; Ralph L. Bryant: 1,248, 7.85%)	3,898	24.52%	15,894	+180	+1.13%
15th	**U. W. Clemon (inc.)***	8,178	88.69%	Phillip Lenud	588	6.38%	TaRone Marquette	455	4.93%	9,221	+7,590	+82.31%
16th	**Ryan deGraffenried***	12,870	68.22%	John Goodson	5,995	31.78%	—	—	—	18,865	+6,875	+36.44%
17th	**Doug Cook**	10,492	44.35%	**Buddy Armstrong**	**7,300**	**30.86%**	Byron Chew	5,865	24.79%	23,657	+3,192	+13.49%
19th	**John Teague (inc.)**	9,050	48.27%	**Billy Atkinson**	**4,764**	**25.41%**	2 others (Note: Phil Bradford: 2,509, 13.38%; John Martin Patteron: 2,425, 12.93%)	4,934	26.32%	18,748	+4,286	+22.86%
20th	**Donald Holmes***	12,151	51.57%	Jim Main	4,999	21.22%	2 others (Note: John Casey: 4,710, 19.99%; Robert Elders: 1,701, 7.22%)	6,411	27.21%	23,561	+7,152	+30.36%
21st	**Ted Little (inc.)***	16,032	55.85%	Larry Morris	12,675	44.15%	—	—	—	28,707	+3,357	+11.69%
23rd	**Mike Weeks**	9,368	40.80%	**Dale Segrest**	**8,755**	**38.13%**	Charles L. Weston	4,837	21.07%	22,960	+613	+2.67%
24th	**Chip Bailey**	4,929	25.86%	Phillip J. Hamm	4,032	21.16%	4 others (Note: Billy Nolen: 3,886, 20.39%; Critt Snellgrove: 3,082, 16.17%; Don Hudspeth; 1,613, 8.46%; Justice Bigbie: 1,517, 7.96%)	10,098	52.98%	19,059	+897	+4.71%
25th	**Wallace Miller***	13,635	54.17%	Nathan Mathis	8,600	34.17%	Nick Zorn	2,936	11.66%	25,171	+5,035	+20.00%
26th	**Don Harrison**	6,970	35.58%	**Jerry Powell (inc.)**	**6,631**	**33.85%**	Bobby Bowles	5,987	30.56%	19,588	+339	+1.73%
27th	**Bishop N. Barron***	10,435	54.20%	Don Camp	7,225	37.53%	Clair Chisler	1,591	8.26%	19,251	+3,210	+16.67%
28th	**Cordy Taylor**	8,162	36.40%	**Edward L. Turner**	**8,096**	**36.11%**	Gordon Allen	6,165	27.49%	22,423	+66	+0.29%
29th	**Earl Goodwin (inc.)***	14,323	60.59%	John A. Lockett	9,316	39.41%	—	—	—	23,639	+5,007	+21.18%
30th	**Edward Robertson***	13,174	62.30%	Dawson Chism	7,972	37.70%	—	—	—	21,146	+5,202	+24.60%
31st	**Reo Kirkland Jr.**	10,675	39.59%	**Gene Garrett**	**7,192**	**26.67%**	3 others (Note: J. W. Sales: 4,150, 15.39%; Buck Williams: 2,529, 9.38%; Tommy Chapman: 2,416, 8.96%)	9,095	33.73%	26,962	+3,483	+12.92%
32nd	**Bob Culledge**	10,963	46.37%	**Dick Owen (inc.)**	**8,051**	**34.06%**	Percy L. Beech	4,626	19.57%	23,640	+2,912	+12.32%
33rd	**Michael Figures***	6,480	53.58%	Mike Perloff (inc.)	3,510	29.02%	James McCullough	2,104	17.40%	12,094	+2,970	+24.56%
35th	**Bob Glass***	7,229	53.07%	John M. Tyson	6,392	46.93%	—	—	—	13,621	+837	+6.14%
Source: The Birmingham News

=== Nominated without opposition ===
The following candidates were the only candidates to file for their district's Democratic primary

- District 4: Finis St. John (inc.)
- District 9: Hinton Mitchem
- District 12: Pat Vacca (inc.)
- District 13: J. Richmond Pearson (inc.)
- District 18: Lester Hill Proctor (inc.)
- District 22: Dutch Higginbotham (inc.)
- District 34: Sonny Callahan

== Republican primary results ==
Republicans contested nine state senate seats. Due to a general lack of Republican candidates across the state, only one of these districts, District 11, required a primary.

=== Results by district ===
District	Winner			Loser			Total		
District	Candidate	Votes	%	Candidate	Votes	%	Votes	Maj.	Mrg.
11th	James K. Watley	3,004	71.64%	Nick Kirst	1,189	28.36%	4,193	+1,815	+43.29%
Source: The Birmingham News

=== Nominated without opposition ===
The following candidates were the only candidates to file for their district's Republican primary:

- District 10: Jimmy Dill
- District 12: Evan Veal
- District 18: Tom Longshore
- District 24: Richard A. Britt
- District 26: Bob E. Allen
- District 27: Herbert Morton
- District 33: James B. Norsworthy
- District 35: Danny Perry

== 1975–1978 special elections ==
=== District 19 ===
A special election in District 19 was triggered by the resignation of incumbent Democratic senator Bobby Weaver after he pleaded guilty to embezzlement charges in January 1976. State representative John Teague won the special election to succeed him.

1976 Alabama Senate District 19 special Democratic primary May 4, 1976
Party	Candidate	Votes	%
Democratic	→ John Teague	3,404	17.44%
Democratic	→ Grover H. Whaley	2,838	14.54%
Democratic	R. H. Waid	2,612	13.34%
Democratic	Roy H. Coshatt	2,343	12.00%
Democratic	Jack A. Wallace	2,103	10.77%
Democratic	A. C. Shelton	1,975	10.12%
Democratic	Allen Hudston	1,920	9.83%
Democratic	Hubert Hubbard	1,313	6.73%
Democratic	L. N. Payne Jr.	1,015	5.20%
Total votes		19,523	100.00%

1976 Alabama Senate District 19 special Democratic runoff May 25, 1976
Party	Candidate	Votes	%
Democratic	John Teague	5,552	62.49%
Democratic	Grover H. Whaley	3,332	37.51%
Total votes		8,884	100.00%

1976 Alabama Senate District 19 special election August 31, 1976
Party	Candidate	Votes	%	±%
Democratic	John Teague	2,774	79.60%	−20.40%
Alabama Conservative	J. P. Mitchell	711	20.40%	New
Total votes		8,884	100.00%	

=== District 29 ===
A special election in District 29 was triggered by the death of incumbent Democratic senator Walter C. Givhan on February 18, 1976. Republican national committeewoman Jean Sullivan and businessman Earl Goodwin both sought the seat. An apparent miscount in Dallas County put Sullivan ahead, but Goodwin took the lead after the mistake was discovered. Earl Goodwin spent over $20,000 on his successful state senate bid, spending about $15,000 on advertising. In 1976, Alabama lacked any sort of provision providing for an automatic recount in a general or general special election. Sullivan considered contesting the results of the race into late September. On September 28, the deadline to file a recount, Sullivan stated that she would not contest the results, saying she "regrets that the recount cannot be done because so many people want to know the truth about the election."

1976 Alabama Senate District 29 special election August 31, 1976
Party	Candidate	Votes	%	±%
Democratic	Earl Goodwin	6,253	36.33%	−33.12%
Republican	Jean Sullivan	6,161	35.79%	New
Independent	Joe Pilcher Jr.	4,798	27.88%	New
Total votes		17,212	100.00%	
Democratic hold				

=== District 25 ===
A special election in District 25 was triggered after incumbent Democratic senator Crum Foshee was forced to vacate his seat due to a mail fraud conviction. Radio station owner Wallace Miller easily won the special election. Over a year after Foshee's initial conviction, the Fifth Circuit Court reversed Foshee's conviction, ruling that he and his brother were entitled to a new trial. Under state law, lawmakers are disqualified from holding office if they are sentenced to prison; however, they "shall be returned to office" if a conviction is overturned. On March 21, 1978, the Senate voted to reinstate Foshee 29 to 0. Wallace Miller abstained from the vote, and there was no animosity reported between the two, with Lieutenant Governor Jere Beasley stating "it was like a mother choosing between two children." In the 1978 primaries, Foshee declined to run again, with Wallace Miller once again being elected state senator.

1976 Alabama Senate District 25 special election November 2, 1976
Party	Candidate	Votes	%	±%
Democratic	Wallace Miller	20,270	79.57%	−20.43%
Independent	Mike Purnell	5,203	20.43%	New
Total votes		25,473	100.00%	
Democratic hold				

Motion to reinstate Crum Foshee
Choice	Votes
Yes	29
No	0
Abstentions	2
Not voting	4
Crum Foshee reinstated

=== District 1 ===
A special election in District 1 was triggered after incumbent Democratic senator Ronnie Flippo resigned in November 1976. He was elected U.S. Representative in November 1976, but resigned from his state senate post early to allow for an earlier special election to take place. Former Florence city councilor Oscar Peden, who described himself as an "Independent Democrat", won in an upset over Democratic attorney Jimmy Hunt, who was backed by the state Democratic executive committee and Governor George Wallace. Oscar Peden attempted to run for re-election as a Democrat in 1978, but was eliminated in the Democratic primary.

1977 Alabama Senate District 1 special election February 1, 1977
Party	Candidate	Votes	%	±%
Independent	Oscar Peden	6,009	52.44%	New
Democratic	Jimmy Hunt	5,449	47.56%	−52.44%
Total votes		11,458	100.00%	
Independent gain from Democratic				

=== District 22 ===
A special election in Senate District 22 was triggered after incumbent Democratic senator C. C. Torbert Jr.'s election to the Alabama Supreme Court in 1976. Democratic member of the Alabama House of Representatives G. J. Higginbotham defeated independent Frank Roberts for the seat.

1977 Alabama Senate District 22 special election February 22, 1977
Party	Candidate	Votes	%	±%
Democratic	G. J. Higginbotham	3,649	71.77%	−28.23%
Independent	Frank Roberts	1,435	28.23%	New
Total votes		5,084	100.00%	
Democratic hold				

=== District 18 ===
A special election in District 18 was triggered by the resignation of incumbent Democratic senator Obie Littleton after his sentencing to prison for fraud. Lister Hill Proctor won the election to succeed Littleton.

1977 Alabama Senate District 18 special Democratic primary August 16, 1977
Party	Candidate	Votes	%
Democratic	Lister Hill Proctor	3,392	62.65%
Democratic	Frank Owen	2,022	37.35%
Total votes		5,414	100.00%

== See also ==
- 1978 United States Senate election in Alabama
- 1978 Alabama gubernatorial election
- List of Alabama state legislatures
