= 2002 Alabama Senate election =

- November 7, 2002

All 35 seats in the Alabama Senate 18 seats needed for a majority

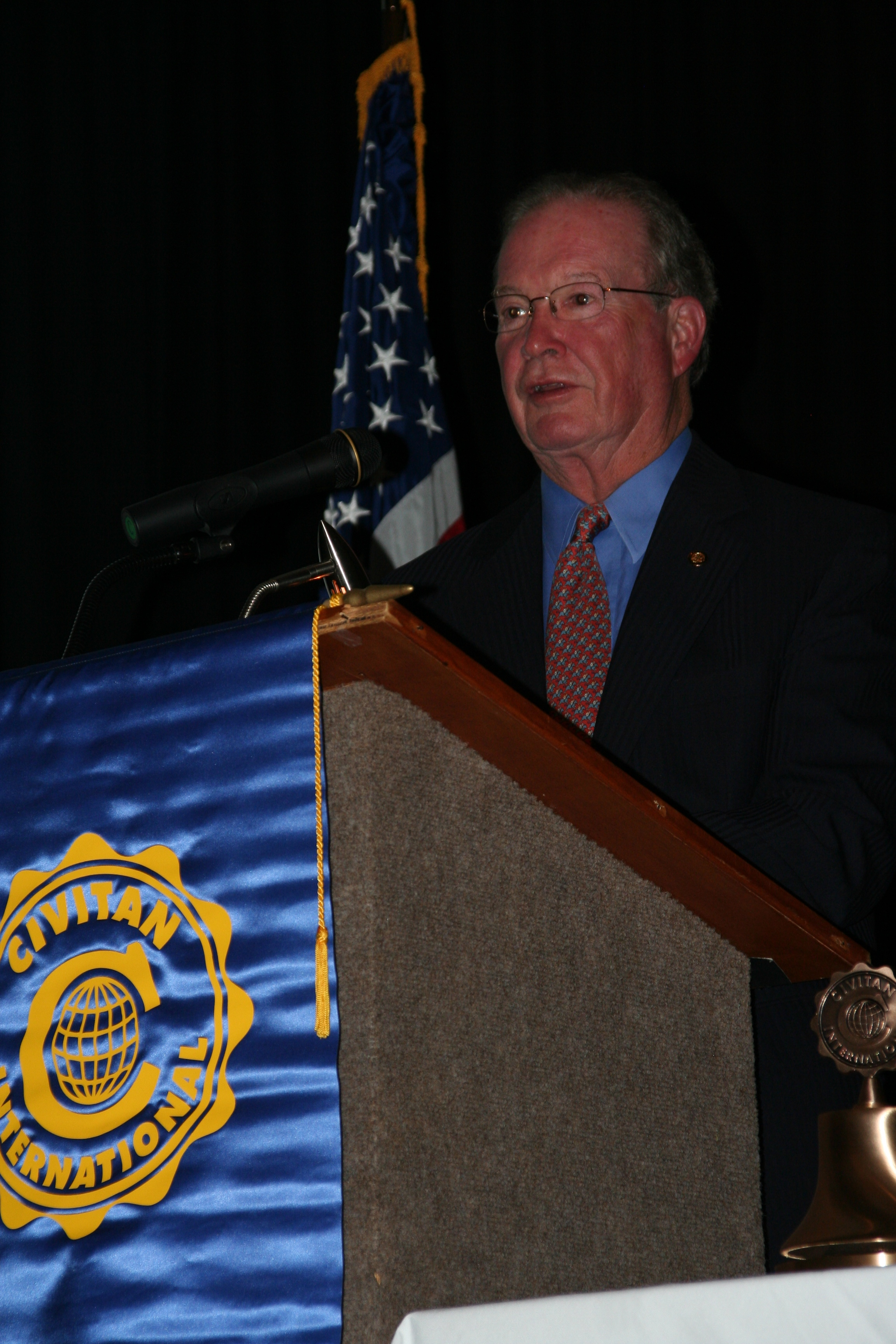
	Majority party	Minority party
Leader	Lowell Barron	J. T. Waggoner
Party	Democratic	Republican
Leader since	January 12, 1999	1999
Leader's seat	District 8	District 16
Last election	24	11
Seats after	25	10
Seat change	▲1	▼1
Popular vote	647,267	549,943
Percentage	52.36%	44.48%
- Results: Democratic gain Democratic hold Republican hold
President Pro Tempore before election
Lowell Barron
Democratic
Elected President Pro Tempore
Lowell Barron
Democratic

The 2002 Alabama Senate election was held on November 7, 2002, to determine which party would control the Alabama Senate for the following four years in the 2002–2006 Alabama Legislature. All 35 seats in the Alabama Senate were up for election, and the primary occurred on June 6, 2002. Prior to the election, 24 seats were held by Democrats and 11 seats were held by Republicans. The general election saw Democrats expand their majority in the State Senate by a single seat.

== Predictions ==
Source	Ranking	As of
The Cook; Political Report	Solid D	October 4, 2002

== Retirements ==
=== Democrats ===
1. District 26: Charles Langford retired.
2. District 28: George H. Clay retired.

=== Republicans ===
1. District 14: Bill Armistead retired to unsuccessfully run for lieutenant governor of Alabama.
2. District 32: Albert Lipscomb retired.

== Defeated incumbents ==
=== In general ===
==== Republicans ====
1. District 35: George Callahan lost re-election to Gary Tanner.

== Closest races ==
Seats where the margin of victory was under 10%:

1. District 35, 1.91% (gain)
2. District 22, 2.45%

== Results ==
=== District 1 ===
District 1 election, 2002
Party	Candidate	Votes	%
Democratic	Bobby E. Denton (incumbent)	25,174	63.57%
Republican	Quinton Hanson	14,347	36.23%
	Scattering	81	0.20%
Total votes		39,602	100.0%
Democratic hold			

=== District 2 ===
District 2 election, 2002
Party	Candidate	Votes	%
Democratic	Tom Butler (incumbent)	23,922	57.51%
Republican	Steve Andrews	17,488	42.05%
	Scattering	183	0.44%
Total votes		41,593	100.0%
Democratic hold			

=== District 3 ===
District 3 election, 2002
Party	Candidate	Votes	%
Democratic	Tommy Ed Roberts (incumbent)	26,359	62.58%
Republican	Terry Smith	15,729	37.34%
	Scattering	35	0.08%
Total votes		42,123	100.0%
Democratic hold			

=== District 4 ===
District 4 election, 2002
Party	Candidate	Votes	%
Democratic	Zeb Little (incumbent)	24,439	61.70%
Republican	H. Guy Hunt	14,279	36.05%
Libertarian	Greg Graves	836	2.11%
	Scattering	55	0.14%
Total votes		39,609	100.0%
Democratic hold			

=== District 5 ===
District 5 election, 2002
Party	Candidate	Votes	%
Republican	Curt Lee (incumbent)	23,657	57.95%
Democratic	John Randall Dutton	17,133	41.97%
	Scattering	31	0.08%
Total votes		40,821	100.0%
Republican hold			

=== District 6 ===
District 6 election, 2002
Party	Candidate	Votes	%
Democratic	Roger Bedford Jr. (incumbent)	23,486	60.57%
Republican	Betty Frazier	15,205	39.22%
	Scattering	82	0.21%
Total votes		38,773	100.0%
Democratic hold			

=== District 7 ===
District 7 election, 2002
Party	Candidate	Votes	%
Democratic	Jeff Enfinger (Note: Switched parties from Republican to Democratic in 2000.) (incumbent)	25,365	64.06%
Republican	Elbert Peters	12,823	32.39%
Libertarian	Gregory Bacon	1,266	3.20%
	Scattering	139	0.35%
Total votes		39,593	100.0%
Democratic hold			

=== District 8 ===
District 8 election, 2002
Party	Candidate	Votes	%
Democratic	Lowell Barron (incumbent)	19,890	58.20%
Republican	David Hammonds	14,222	41.62%
	Scattering	61	0.18%
Total votes		34,173	100.0%
Democratic hold			

=== District 9 ===
District 9 election, 2002
Party	Candidate	Votes	%
Democratic	Hinton Mitchem (incumbent)	24,603	58.94%
Republican	Doris Edmonds	16,995	40.72%
	Scattering	144	0.34%
Total votes		41,742	100.0%
Democratic hold			

=== District 10 ===
District 10 election, 2002
Party	Candidate	Votes	%
Democratic	Larry Means (incumbent)	24,702	67.75%
Republican	David Williams	11,670	32.00%
	Scattering	92	0.25%
Total votes		36,464	100.0%
Democratic hold			

=== District 11 ===
District 11 election, 2002
Party	Candidate	Votes	%
Democratic	Jim Preuitt (incumbent)	23,397	66.88%
Republican	Ralph Bradford	11,469	32.79%
	Scattering	114	0.33%
Total votes		34,980	100.0%
Democratic hold			

=== District 12 ===
District 12 election, 2002
Party	Candidate	Votes	%
Republican	Del Marsh (incumbent)	22,712	59.18%
Democratic	Preston Gray Jr.	15,537	40.48%
	Scattering	131	0.34%
Total votes		38,380	100.0%
Republican hold			

=== District 13 ===
District 13 election, 2002
Party	Candidate	Votes	%
Democratic	Gerald Dial (incumbent)	24,528	99.26%
	Scattering	182	0.74%
Total votes		24,710	100.0%
Democratic hold			

=== District 14 ===
District 14 election, 2002
Party	Candidate	Votes	%
Republican	Hank Erwin	33,936	98.67%
	Scattering	459	1.33%
Total votes		34,395	100.0%
Republican hold			

=== District 15 ===
District 15 election, 2002
Party	Candidate	Votes	%
Republican	Steve French (incumbent)	37,003	88.46%
Libertarian	John Turner	4,675	11.18%
	Scattering	149	0.36%
Total votes		41,827	100.0%
Republican hold			

=== District 16 ===
District 16 election, 2002
Party	Candidate	Votes	%
Republican	J. T. Waggoner (incumbent)	42,316	98.56%
	Scattering	618	1.44%
Total votes		42,934	100.0%
Republican hold			

=== District 17 ===
District 17 election, 2002
Party	Candidate	Votes	%
Republican	Jack Biddle (incumbent)	30,478	83.92%
Libertarian	Caroline Moore	5,685	15.65%
	Scattering	155	0.43%
Total votes		36,318	100.0%
Republican hold			

=== District 18 ===
District 18 election, 2002
Party	Candidate	Votes	%
Democratic	Rodger Smitherman (incumbent)	28,206	98.55%
	Scattering	414	1.45%
Total votes		28,620	100.0%
Democratic hold			

=== District 19 ===
District 19 election, 2002
Party	Candidate	Votes	%
Democratic	Edward McClain (incumbent)	28,085	76.79%
Republican	Cliff Walker	8,451	23.10%
	Scattering	39	0.11%
Total votes		36,575	100.0%
Democratic hold			

=== District 20 ===
District 20 election, 2002
Party	Candidate	Votes	%
Democratic	Sundra Escott-Russell (incumbent)	28,775	98.67%
	Scattering	389	1.33%
Total votes		29,164	100.0%
Democratic hold			

=== District 21 ===
District 21 election, 2002
Party	Candidate	Votes	%
Democratic	Phil Poole (incumbent)	19,914	58.77%
Republican	Jerry Tingle	13,179	38.89%
Libertarian	Jean Allen	769	2.27%
	Scattering	23	0.07%
Total votes		33,885	100.0%
Democratic hold			

=== District 22 ===
District 22 election, 2002
Party	Candidate	Votes	%
Democratic	Pat Lindsey (incumbent)	18,899	51.12%
Republican	Sheldon Day	17,993	48.67%
	Scattering	81	0.21%
Total votes		36,973	100.0%
Democratic hold			

=== District 23 ===
District 23 election, 2002
Party	Candidate	Votes	%
Democratic	Henry Sanders (incumbent)	26,361	70.53%
Libertarian	Richard Motes	10,882	29.11%
	Scattering	135	0.36%
Total votes		37,378	100.0%
Democratic hold			

=== District 24 ===
District 24 election, 2002
Party	Candidate	Votes	%
Democratic	Charles Steele Jr. (incumbent)	28,942	98.35%
	Scattering	487	1.65%
Total votes		29,429	100.0%
Democratic hold			

=== District 25 ===
District 25 election, 2002
Party	Candidate	Votes	%
Republican	Larry Dixon (incumbent)	36,716	77.61%
Democratic	Hobson Cox	8,996	19.01%
Libertarian	Mark Hayden	1,498	3.17%
	Scattering	101	0.21%
Total votes		47,311	100.0%
Republican hold			

=== District 26 ===
District 26 election, 2002
Party	Candidate	Votes	%
Democratic	Quinton Ross	23,587	72.12%
Republican	Beverly Ray Love	9,113	27.87%
	Scattering	4	0.01%
Total votes		32,704	100.0%
Democratic hold			

=== District 27 ===
District 27 election, 2002
Party	Candidate	Votes	%
Democratic	T. D. Little (incumbent)	23,155	64.06%
Republican	Keith Ward	12,943	35.81%
	Scattering	50	0.13%
Total votes		36,148	100.0%
Democratic hold			

=== District 28 ===
District 28 election, 2002
Party	Candidate	Votes	%
Democratic	Myron Penn	26,106	85.45%
Libertarian	Daniel Bowden	4,400	14.40%
	Scattering	44	0.15%
Total votes		30,550	100.0%
Democratic hold			

=== District 29 ===
District 29 election, 2002
Party	Candidate	Votes	%
Republican	Harri Anne Smith (incumbent)	28,584	98.68%
	Scattering	383	1.32%
Total votes		28,967	100.0%
Republican hold			

=== District 30 ===
District 30 election, 2002
Party	Candidate	Votes	%
Democratic	Wendell Mitchell (incumbent)	25,930	98.61%
	Scattering	366	1.39%
Total votes		26,296	100.0%
Democratic hold			

=== District 31 ===
District 31 election, 2002
Party	Candidate	Votes	%
Democratic	Jimmy Holley (incumbent)	22,517	65.17%
Republican	Gregory White	11,935	34.54%
	Scattering	100	0.29%
Total votes		34,552	100.0%
Democratic hold			

=== District 32 ===
District 32 election, 2002
Party	Candidate	Votes	%
Republican	Bradley Byrne	32,743	89.93%
Libertarian	Richard Medicus	3,431	9.42%
	Scattering	235	0.65%
Total votes		36,409	100.0%
Republican hold			

=== District 33 ===
District 33 election, 2002
Party	Candidate	Votes	%
Democratic	Vivian Davis Figures (incumbent)	23,433	99.80%
	Scattering	47	0.20%
Total votes		23,480	100.0%
Democratic hold			

=== District 34 ===
District 34 election, 2002
Party	Candidate	Votes	%
Republican	Hap Myers (incumbent)	28,723	99.89%
	Scattering	31	0.11%
Total votes		28,754	100.0%
Republican hold			

=== District 35 ===
District 35 election, 2002
Party	Candidate	Votes	%
Democratic	Gary Tanner	15,826	50.93%
Republican	George Callahan (incumbent)	15,234	49.02%
	Scattering	14	0.05%
Total votes		31,074	100.0%
Democratic gain from Republican			
