= 1983 Alabama Senate special election =

- November 8, 1983

All 35 seats in the Alabama State Senate 18 seats needed for a majority
- Turnout: 16.10% ▼21.38 pp
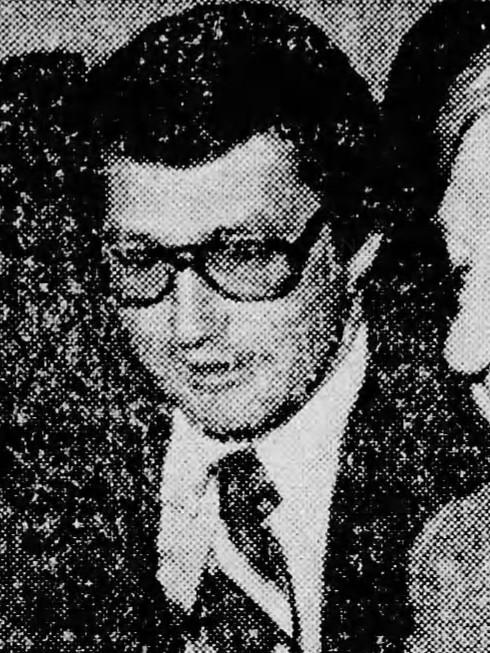

	Majority party	Minority party
Leader	John Teague	—
Party	Democratic	Republican
Leader since	January 11, 1983	—
Leader's seat	11th–Childersburg	—
Last election	32 seats, 85.37%	3 seats, 14.40%
Seats before	31	4
Seats won	28	4
Seats after	29	4
Popular vote	220,149	76,885
Percentage	63.52%	22.18%
	Third party	Fourth party
Party	Independent	Write-in
Last election	New	0 seats, 0.01%
Seats before	0	—
Seats won	2	1 (Note: Write-in candidate Lowell Barron served as a Democrat)
Seats after	2	—
Popular vote	41,538	8,026
Percentage	11.98%	2.31%
- District results Democratic: 40–50% 50–60% 60–70% 70–80% 80–90% 90–100% Unopposed; Republican: 40–50% 80–90% Unopposed; Independent: 40–50% 50–60% Write-in: 50–60%
President pro tempore before election
John Teague
Democratic
Elected President pro tempore
John Teague
Democratic

A special election in the U.S. State of Alabama took place on Tuesday, November 8, 1983, to elect 35 representatives to serve 3-year terms in the Alabama Senate. Special elections for every seat in the Alabama Legislature were mandated by federal courts after the reapportionment plans passed by the state legislature were found to have stifled Black American representation, violating the 1965 Voting Rights Act. A court-modified interim map was used for the 1982 general election, after which legislators were ordered to come up with a new map that would comply with the VRA.

The Republican primary election was held on September 6, with runoff elections on September 27. The State Democratic Executive Committee decided against holding a primary, instead choosing to hand-pick Democratic legislative nominees at a committee meeting on October 1. The decision of the SDEC was highly controversial, and it turned down the renomination of several incumbent state legislators. Several ousted state legislators sought and won re-election as independent candidates, and some political analysts attributed the Democratic backlash and the success of conservative independents and Republicans in both houses of the legislature to the SDEC's decision. Marty Connors, the executive director of the Alabama Republican Party, called the 1983 election "the birth of the two-party system in Alabama." The Mobile Register's opinion page called the Democratic decision "unwise."

Twenty-eight Democrats and four Republicans were elected. Three independent candidates, former Rep. Gerald Dial, Sen. Foy Covington, and Sen. Lowell Barron won election to the state senate. Covington and Barron were Democratic incumbents previously ousted at the SDEC meeting, with Barron winning as a write-in candidate. Barron's victory was historic, as it was the first time in living memory that a candidate won a state office by way of write-in votes. Five members elected were Black and two were women.

Special elections to the state house were held in parallel to state senate elections. Two statewide constitutional amendments were also set to be placed on the November ballot: a proposed rewrite of the state constitution, and a proposed transfer of three state-owned docks to local agencies. The former amendment was struck from the ballot by the Alabama Supreme Court, leaving only the latter to be decided. With no statewide race or major constitutional issue on the ballot, voter turnout was incredibly light, ranging from 25 percent to just 8 percent depending on the district. Incumbent Senate president pro tempore John Teague was re-elected to his position on November 16, 1983.

== Reapportionment ==
Despite the 1901 Alabama Constitution mandating the Alabama Legislature to conduct redistricting after every U.S. census, the legislature simply never did so successfully despite massive changes in the population balance. The legislature never even attempted reapportionment until after the 1970 U.S. census. Legislative elections in 1982, 1978, 1974, 1970, and 1966 were held under plans drawn or modified by federal courts. After the 1980 U.S. census, the legislature attempted to pass a legislative plan satisfactory to the federal courts, but it was rejected by the U.S. Justice Department. A second attempt at a plan was also rejected. In the spring of 1982, the federal courts imposed a modified version of the legislature's plan for the 1982 general election, requiring the legislature to come up with a new map on its own during the 1983 session.

On February 17, 1983, a third plan was passed by the legislature with the approval of Black legislative leaders. On February 28, the plan was approved by the Justice Department. William Bradford Reynolds, the 10th United States Assistant Attorney General for the Civil Rights Division, said the plan was "fair to black and white citizens alike." A Department official called the reapportionment "the most significant achievement ever accomplished under the 1965 Voting Rights Act," and state senator Lister Hill Proctor claimed that "for the first time in history, we have endeavored to do what was required of us by the Constitution." The plan was expected to increase Black representation in the Senate from three members to five.

On April 11, 1983, a three-judge federal tribunal approved the new maps. Legislative leaders had hoped that special elections would only be needed in Alabama's Black Belt, where the greatest boundary changes occurred, but a three-judge panel required a special election for every seat in the legislature to be held, with every incumbent state legislator's term ending by December 31, 1983. The legislature's reapportionment committee decided against contesting the order for a statewide special election.

=== Call of the special election ===
Governor of Alabama George Wallace was ordered to call a statewide special election by July 8. United States federal judge Truman Hobbs threatened to take "appropriate action" if the court's call was not heeded, and that the reapportionment order "will not be frustrated." Wallace set the date of the election to September 27, 1983, a date which would have not given parties sufficient time to conduct primary elections. Montgomery attorney Julian McPhillips requested the court to order primary elections, believing that a lack of party primaries would violate previous orders, as it would allow the State Democratic Executive Committee to hand-pick incumbents that were elected under illegal maps. Wallace eventually changed his position and ordered the special election to be held on November 8. After the date change, state Republicans voted to hold a primary; Democrats did not. There was no state or federal law that mandated a party to call a primary election. The SDEC voted 88-24 against holding a primary. The decision was harshly criticized, with opponents claiming that the Committee was allowing special interest groups to dictate party nominees.

== Summary ==
1983 Alabama Senate special election results
Party	Races	Seats		Aggregate votes		1982 general		Change		Seats after
Party	Races	No.	Percent	No.	Percent	Seats	Vote %	Seats	Vote %	Seats after
Democratic	33	28	80.00%	220,149	63.52%	32	85.37%	−4	−21.85%	29
Republican	15	4	11.43%	76,885	22.18%	3	14.40%	+1	+7.78%	4
Independents	9	2	5.71%	41,538	11.98%	DNC		+2	+11.98%	2
Write-in		1	2.86%	8,026	2.31%	0	0.01%	+1	+2.30%	—
Totals	57	35		1,230,093	100%	35	—	35	—	—
Turnout				346,598	16.10%	—	37.48%	—	−21.38%	—
Registered voters				2,151,990						

== Incumbents ==
Most senators elected in the 1982 general election sought re-election.

=== Won re-election ===
- District 1: Bobby E. Denton (Democratic) won re-election.
- District 2: Roger Bedford Jr. (Democratic) won re-election in District 6.
- District 3: Gary Aldridge won re-election.
- District 4: Steve Cooley (Democratic) won re-election.
- District 5: Charles Bishop (Democratic) won re-election.
- District 6: Jim Smith (Democratic) won re-election in District 2.
- District 7: Bill Smith (Democratic) won re-election.
- District 8: Lowell Barron (Democratic) lost the Democratic nomination to David Stout and won re-election as a write-in candidate.
- District 9: Hinton Mitchem (Democratic) won re-election.
- District 11: William J. Cabaniss (Republican) won re-election in District 16.
- District 12: John Amari (Democratic) won re-election in District 15.
- District 13: J. Richmond Pearson (Democratic) won re-election in District 18.
- District 14: Mac Parsons (Democratic) won re-election in District 17.
- District 15: Earl Hilliard Sr. (Democratic) won re-election in District 20.
- District 16: Ryan deGraffenried (Democratic) won re-election in District 21.
- District 19: John Teague (Democratic) won re-election in District 11.
- District 20: Donald G. Holmes (Democratic) won re-election in District 12.
- District 21: T. D. Little (Democratic) won re-election in District 27.
- District 22: Danny Corbett (Democratic) won re-election in District 28.
- District 23: Foy Covington (Democratic) lost the District 30 nomination to Wendell Mitchell and won re-election as an independent candidate.
- District 24: Chip Bailey (Democratic) won re-election in District 29.
- District 25: Crum Foshee (Democratic) won re-election in District 31.
- District 27: Larry Dixon (Democratic) won re-election in District 25 as a Republican.
- District 28: Wendell Mitchell (Democratic) lost re-election in District 30.
- District 29: Earl Goodwin (Democratic) won re-election in District 24.
- District 33: Michael Figures (Democratic) won re-election.
- District 34: Ann Bedsole (Republican) won re-election.
- District 35: Bill Menton (Democratic) won re-election.

=== Lost re-election ===
- District 32: Jerry Boyington (Democratic) lost the Democratic nomination to Dick Owen and unsuccessfully ran for re-election as an independent candidate.

=== Eliminated at convention ===
- District 18: Lister Hill Proctor (Democratic) lost the District 11 nomination to John Teague.
- District 30: Ed Robertson (Democratic) lost the District 5 nomination to Charles Bishop.

=== Did not seek re-election ===
- District 10: Larry Keener (Democratic) did not seek re-election.
- District 17: Spencer Bachus (Republican) successfully ran for the Alabama House of Representatives' 46th district.
- District 26: Don Harrison (Democratic) did not seek re-election.
- District 31: Reo Kirkland Jr. (Democratic) withdrew from seeking re-election.

== General election results ==
=== By district ===
District	Democratic			Republican			Others			Scattering		Total		
District	Candidate	Votes	%	Candidate	Votes	%	Candidate	Votes	%	Votes	%	Votes	Maj.	Mrg.
2nd	Jim Smith (inc.)	7,120	75.92%	—	—	—	Marvin A. Clem (Ind.)	2,258	24.08%	—	—	9,378	+4,862	+51.84%
3rd	Gary Aldridge (inc.)	7,315	74.82%	Ed Humphries	2,460	25.16%	—	—	—	2	0.02%	9,777	+4,855	+49.66%
4th	Steve Cooley (inc.)	5,687	46.86%	Don Hale	4,827	39.77%	Morgan Edwards (Ind.)	1,623	13.37%	—	—	12,137	+860	+7.09%
5th	Charles Bishop (inc.)	6,314	75.81%	Loyd E. Lawson	1,984	23.82%	—	—	—	31	0.37%	8,329	+4,330	+51.99%
6th	Roger Bedford Jr. (inc.)	8,387	78.43%	Jim Watley	2,306	21.57%	—	—	—	—	—	10,693	+6,081	+56.87%
8th	J. David Stout	5,994	44.39%	—	—	—	Lowell Barron (WI, inc.)	7,496	55.51%	14	0.10%	13,504	−1,502	−11.12%
10th	Bill Drinkard	8,156	73.88%	Alan C. Loveman	2,883	26.12%	—	—	—	—	—	11,039	+5,273	+47.77%
11th	John Teague (inc.)	3,094	87.52%	—	—	—	Curtis Lambert (WI)	388	10.98%	53	1.50%	3,535	+2,706	+76.55%
13th	John Casey	6,587	47.13%	—	—	—	Gerald Dial (Ind.)	7,386	52.85%	2	0.01%	13,975	−799	−5.72%
14th	Butch Ellis Jr.	8,354	62.87%	Don Murphy	4,934	37.13%	—	—	—	—	—	13,288	+3,420	+25.74%
16th	Bob Hood	1,384	13.03%	William J. Cabaniss (inc.)	9,238	86.97%	—	—	—	—	—	10,622	−7,854	−73.94%
17th	Mac Parsons (inc.)	8,844	57.69%	—	—	—	Tom Gloor (Ind.)	6,487	42.31%	—	—	15,331	+2,357	+15.37%
20th	Earl Hilliard Sr. (inc.)	7,261	86.05%	Franklin Tate	1,177	13.95%	—	—	—	—	—	8,438	+6,084	+72.10%
22nd	Frances Strong	8,562	52.64%	Don French	7,702	47.35%	—	—	—	1	0.01%	16,265	+860	+5.29%
23rd	Hank Sanders	20,031	70.81%	John Peel	8,257	29.19%	—	—	—	1	0.00%	28,289	+11,774	+41.62%
24th	Earl Goodwin (inc.)	7,211	50.44%	Ed Martin	2,601	18.19%	Walter Owens (Ind.)	4,484	31.37%	—	—	14,296	+2,727	+19.08%
28th	Danny Corbett (inc.)	9,818	56.10%	—	—	—	Calvin Biggers (Ind.)	7,683	43.90%	—	—	17,501	+2,135	+12.20%
30th	Wendell Mitchell (inc.)	6,598	43.99%	Perry Green	1,730	11.53%	J. Foy Covington Jr. (Ind, inc.)	6,670	44.47%	—	—	14,998	−72	−0.48%
32nd	Dick Owen	4,599	26.92%	Perry Hand	7,541	44.13%	Jerry Boyington (Ind, inc.)	4,947	28.95%	—	—	17,087	−2,594	−15.18%
Source: Alabama Secretary of State

=== Elected unopposed ===
The following candidates did not see any competition in the general election:

- District 1: Bobby E. Denton (Democratic, inc.) received 6,719 votes.
- District 7: Bill Smith (Democratic, inc.) received 9,800 votes.
- District 9: Hinton Mitchem (Democratic, inc.) received 4,588 votes. Additionally, 30 write-in votes were cast.
- District 12: Donald G. Holmes (Democratic, inc.) received 4,013 votes.
- District 15: John Amari (Democratic, inc.) received 5,308 votes.
- District 18: J. Richmond Pearson (Democratic, inc.) received 4,314 votes.
- District 19: Jim Bennett (Democratic) received 6,977 votes.
- District 21: Ryan deGraffenried (Democratic, inc.) received 7,164 votes.
- District 25: Larry Dixon (Republican, inc.) received 10,278 votes.
- District 26: Charles Langford (Democratic) received 9,840 votes.
- District 27: T. D. Little (Democratic, inc.) received 3,431 votes. Additionally, 7 write-in votes were cast.
- District 29: Chip Bailey (Democratic, inc.) received 3,956 votes. Additionally, 1 write-in votes were cast.
- District 31: Crum Foshee (Democratic, inc.) received 1,876 votes.
- District 33: Michael Figures (Democratic) received 4,620 votes.
- District 34: Ann Bedsole (Republican, inc.) received 8,967 votes.
- District 35: Bill Menton (Democratic, inc.) received 6,227 votes.

== Democratic convention ==
The State Democratic Executive Committee decided not to hold a primary for the special election, instead opting to hand-pick nominees at a convention held in Birmingham on October 1. A small handful of Democratic incumbents were ousted by other incumbents as redistricting placed them in the same district:

- District 5: Sen. Ed Robertson lost renomination to Sen. Charles Bishop.
- District 8: Sen. Lowell Barron lost renomination to Rep. David Stout.
- District 11: Sen. Lister Hill Proctor lost renomination to Sen. John Teague.
- District 30: Sen. Foy Covington lost renomination to Sen. Wendell Mitchell.
- District 32: Sen. Jerry Boyington lost renomination to Dick Owen.

Ousted incumbents Foy Covington and Jerry Boyington both filed to run for re-election as independents and won. Lowell Barron, who initially did not run as an independent, started a last-minute write-in campaign and won re-election.

=== Vote by district ===
An asterisk (*) denotes a losing candidate who ran as an independent.

District	Picked		Lost		Ref
District	Candidate	Votes	Candidate	Votes	Ref
5th	Charles Bishop (inc.)	98	Ed Robertson (inc.)	10	
8th	Rep. David Stout	65	Lowell Barron (inc.)*	43	
11th	John Teague (inc.)	71	Lister Hill Proctor (inc.)	37	
13th	Rep. John Casey	79	Fmr Rep. Gerald Dial*	26	
19th	Rep. Jim Bennett	Won	Doug Cook	Lost	
22nd	Frances Strong	53	J. Henry McCulley; Ron Bates; Billy Smith; Tommy Chapman	29; 10; 5; 3	
23rd	Hank Sanders	100	James Coleman	4	
24th	Earl Goodwin (inc.)	99	Rep. Walter Owens*	6	
28th	Danny Corbett (inc.)	Won	Calvin Biggers*	Lost	
30th	Wendell Mitchell (inc.)	66	Foy Covington (inc.)*	38	
32nd	Fmr Sen. Dick Owen	85	Jerry Boyington (inc.)*	20	

== Republican primary results ==
A total of 18 candidates filed to run as Republicans in 16 districts, with only one, District 5, seeing competition between multiple candidates. The first round of the primary was held on September 6, with a runoff on September 27. The Republican runoff election for Senate District 5 was one held in the entire legislature in 1983.

1983 Alabama Senate District 5 special Republican primary September 6, 1983
Party	Candidate	Votes	%
Republican	→ Loyd E. Lawson	357	47.22%
Republican	→ Gary M. Burson	284	37.57%
Republican	Henry Lee Hawkins	115	15.21%
Total votes		756	100.00%

1983 Alabama Senate District 5 special Republican runoff September 27, 1983
Party	Candidate	Votes	%
Republican	Loyd E. Lawson	399	70.49%
Republican	Gary M. Burson	167	29.51%
Total votes		566	100.00%

=== Nominated without opposition ===
The following candidates did not see any competition in the Republican primary election:

- District 3: Ed Humphries
- District 4: Don Hale
- District 6: James Whatley
- District 10: Alan Loveman
- District 14: Donald Murphy
- District 15: Johnny Howell
- District 16: William J. Cabaniss (incumbent)
- District 20: Franklin Tate
- District 22: Don French
- District 23: John Peel
- District 24: Ed Martin
- District 25: Larry Dixon (incumbent) (Note: First elected as a Democrat, switched to the Republican Party in August 1983)
- District 30: Perry Green
- District 32: Perry Hand
- District 34: Ann Bedsole (incumbent)
