= Alabama's 1st Senate district =

American legislative district

Alabama's 1st State Senate district
Senator
Tim Melson; R–Florence
- Demographics: 83.9% White; 8.2% Black; 4% Hispanic; 0.7% Asian
- Population (2022): 146,551

Alabama's 1st State Senate district is one of 35 districts in the Alabama Senate. The district is currently represented by State Senator Tim Melson, a Republican.

== Geography ==
Election	Map	Counties in District
2026; 2022		Lauderdale, portion of Limestone
2018		Portions of Lauderdale, Limestone, Madison
2014		Portions of Lauderdale, Limestone, Madison
2010; 2006; 2002		Lauderdale, portion of Colbert

== Election history ==
=== Elections in the 2020s ===
Alabama Senate election, 2022: Senate District 1
Party	Candidate	Votes	%	±%
Republican	Tim Melson (Incumbent)	35,480	97.94	+30.30
Write-in		748	2.06	+2.01
Majority		34,732	95.87	+60.54
Turnout		36,228		
Republican hold				

=== Elections in the 2010s ===
Alabama Senate election, 2018: Senate District 1
Party	Candidate	Votes	%	±%
Republican	Tim Melson (Incumbent)	33,141	67.64	+5.04
Democratic	Caroline Self	15,830	32.31	−5.02
Write-in		23	0.05	-0.02
Majority		17,311	35.33	+10.06
Turnout		48,994		
Republican hold				

Alabama Senate election, 2014: Senate District 1
Party	Candidate	Votes	%	±%
Republican	Tim Melson	22,982	62.60	+18.55
Democratic	Mike Curtis	13,704	37.33	−18.57
Write-in		25	0.07	+0.02
Majority		9,278	25.27	+13.42
Turnout		36,711		
Republican gain from Democratic				

Alabama Senate election, 2010: Senate District 1
Party	Candidate	Votes	%	±%
Democratic	Tammy Irons	23,178	55.90	−7.86
Republican	Jerry Freeman	18,266	44.05	+7.90
Write-in		20	0.05	-0.04
Majority		4,912	11.85	−15.75
Turnout		41,464		
Democratic hold				

=== Elections in the 2000s ===
Alabama Senate election, 2006: Senate District 1
Party	Candidate	Votes	%	±%
Democratic	Bobby E. Denton (Incumbent)	23,862	63.76	+0.19
Republican	Buddy Brook	13,531	36.15	−0.08
Write-in		32	0.09	-0.11
Majority		10,331	27.60	+0.26
Turnout		37,425		
Democratic hold				

Alabama Senate election, 2002: Senate District 1
Party	Candidate	Votes	%	±%
Democratic	Bobby E. Denton (Incumbent)	25,174	63.57	−7.44
Republican	Quinton Hanson	14,347	36.23	+7.31
Write-in		81	0.20	+0.14
Majority		10,827	27.34	−14.75
Turnout		39,602		
Democratic hold				

=== Elections in the 1990s ===
Alabama Senate election, 1998: Senate District 1
Party	Candidate	Votes	%	±%
Democratic	Bobby E. Denton (Incumbent)	27,746	71.01	−27.42
Republican	John Hargett	11,300	28.92	+28.92
Write-in		25	0.06	
Majority		16,446	42.09	−54.76
Turnout		39,602		
Democratic hold				

Alabama Senate election, 1994: Senate District 1
Party	Candidate	Votes	%	±%
Democratic	Bobby E. Denton (Incumbent)	25,817	98.43	−1.56
Write-in		413	1.57	+1.56
Majority		25,404	96.85	−3.13
Turnout		26,230		
Democratic hold				

Alabama Senate election, 1990: Senate District 1
Party	Candidate	Votes	%	±%
Democratic	Bobby E. Denton (Incumbent)	21,169	99.99	−0.01
Write-in		2	0.01	+0.01
Majority		21,167	99.98	−0.02
Turnout		21,171		
Democratic hold				

=== Elections in the 1980s ===
Alabama Senate election, 1986: Senate District 1
Party	Candidate	Votes	%	±%
Democratic	Bobby E. Denton (Incumbent)	23,136	100.00	
Majority		23,136	100.00	
Turnout		23,136		
Democratic hold				

Alabama Senate election, 1983: Senate District 1
Party	Candidate	Votes	%	±%
Democratic	Bobby E. Denton (Incumbent)	6,719	100.00	
Majority		6,719	100.00	
Turnout		6,719		
Democratic hold				

Alabama Senate election, 1982: Senate District 1
Party	Candidate	Votes	%	±%
Democratic	Bobby E. Denton (Incumbent)	25,168	100.00	
Majority		25,168	100.00	
Turnout		25,168		
Democratic hold				

== District officeholders ==
Senators take office at midnight on the day of their election.

- Tim Melson (2014-present)
- Tammy Irons (2010-2014)
- Bobby E. Denton (1978-2010)
- Oscar Peden (1976 (Note: Peden was elected in a special election.)-1978)
- Ronnie Flippo (1974-1976)
- Stewart O'Bannon Jr. (1966-1974)
- James E. Horton Jr. (1962-1966)
- Elbert Bertram Haltom Jr. (1958-1962)
