= Alabama's 30th Senate district =

Alabama's 30th State Senate district
Senator
Clyde Chambliss; R–Prattville
- Demographics: 68.0% White; 23.9% Black; 4.0% Hispanic; 0.9% Asian
- Population (2022): 137,129

Alabama's 30th Senate district is one of 35 districts in the Alabama Senate. The district has been represented by Clyde Chambliss since 2014.

== Geography ==
Election	Map	Counties in District
2026; 2022		Autauga, Coosa, portions of Chilton, Elmore, Tallapoosa
2018		Autauga, Coosa, portions of Chilton, Elmore, Tallapoosa
2014		Autauga, Coosa, portions of Chilton, Elmore, Tallapoosa
2010; 2006; 2002		Butler, Crenshaw, Pike, portions of Autauga, Elmore, Lowndes

== Election history ==
=== Elections in the 2020s ===
Alabama Senate election, 2022: Senate District 30
Party	Candidate	Votes	%	±%
Republican	Clyde Chambliss (Incumbent)	29,225	97.98	−0.13
Write-in		602	2.02	+0.13
Majority		28,623	95.96	−0.25
Turnout		29,827		
Republican hold				

=== Elections in the 2010s ===
Alabama Senate election, 2018: Senate District 30
Party	Candidate	Votes	%	±%
Republican	Clyde Chambliss (Incumbent)	35,259	98.11	+18.17
Write-in		681	1.89	+1.55
Majority		34,578	96.21	+35.99
Turnout		35,940		
Republican hold				

Alabama Senate election, 2014: Senate District 30
Party	Candidate	Votes	%	±%
Republican	Clyde Chambliss	22,916	79.94	+22.97
Independent	Bryan Morgan	5,653	19.72	+19.72
Write-in		97	0.34	+0.27
Majority		17,263	60.22	+46.21
Turnout		28,666		
Republican hold				

Alabama Senate election, 2010: Senate District 30
Party	Candidate	Votes	%	±%
Republican	Bryan Taylor	25,868	56.97	+19.05
Democratic	Wendell Mitchell (Incumbent)	19,506	42.96	−19.04
Write-in		33	0.07	-0.01
Majority		6,362	14.01	−10.08
Turnout		45,407		
Republican gain from Democratic				

=== Elections in the 2000s ===
Alabama Senate election, 2006: Senate District 30
Party	Candidate	Votes	%	±%
Democratic	Wendell Mitchell (Incumbent)	22,774	62.00	−36.61
Republican	Joan Reynolds	13,927	37.92	+37.92
Write-in		30	0.08	-1.31
Majority		8,847	24.09	−73.13
Turnout		36,731		
Democratic hold				

Alabama Senate election, 2002: Senate District 30
Party	Candidate	Votes	%	±%
Democratic	Wendell Mitchell (Incumbent)	25,930	98.61	+27.64
Write-in		366	1.39	+1.36
Majority		25,564	97.22	+55.25
Turnout		26,296		
Democratic hold				

=== Elections in the 1990s ===
Alabama Senate election, 1998: Senate District 30
Party	Candidate	Votes	%	±%
Democratic	Wendell Mitchell (Incumbent)	27,083	70.97	−28.13
Republican	Pat Owens	11,066	29.00	+29.00
Write-in		11	0.03	-0.87
Majority		16,017	41.97	−56.22
Turnout		38,160		
Democratic hold				

=== Elections in the 1990s ===
Alabama Senate election, 1994: Senate District 30
Party	Candidate	Votes	%	±%
Democratic	Wendell Mitchell (Incumbent)	22,914	99.10	+33.58
Write-in		209	0.90	+0.90
Majority		22,705	98.19	+67.15
Turnout		23,123		
Democratic hold				

Alabama Senate election, 1990: Senate District 30
Party	Candidate	Votes	%	±%
Democratic	Wendell Mitchell	19,757	65.52	−34.48
Republican	Doni Ingram	10,397	34.48	+34.48
Majority		9,360	31.04	−68.96
Turnout		30,154		
Democratic hold				

=== Elections in the 1980s ===
Alabama Senate election, 1986: Senate District 30
Party	Candidate	Votes	%	±%
Democratic	Foy Covington Jr. (Incumbent)	15,778	100.00	+56.01
Majority		15,778	100.00	+99.52
Turnout		15,778		
Democratic gain from Independent				

Alabama Senate election, 1983: Senate District 30
Party	Candidate	Votes	%	±%
Independent	Foy Covington Jr.	6,670	44.47	+44.47
Democratic	Wendell Mitchell	6,598	43.99	−55.94
Republican	Perry Green	1,730	11.53	+11.53
Write-in		1	0.01	-0.06
Majority		72	0.48	
Turnout		14,999		
Independent gain from Democratic				

Alabama Senate election, 1982: Senate District 30
Party	Candidate	Votes	%	±%
Democratic	Edward D. Robertson (Incumbent)	24,515	99.93	
Write-in		18	0.07	
Majority		24,497	99.85	
Turnout		24,533		
Democratic hold				

== District officeholders ==
Senators take office at midnight on the day of their election.

- Clyde Chambliss (2014–present)
- Bryan Taylor (2010–2014)
- Wendell Mitchell (1990–2010)
- Foy Covington Jr. (1983–1990)
- Edward D. Robertson (1978–1983)
- Bert Bank (1974–1978)

Not in use 1966–1974.

- Walter C. Givhan (1954–1966)
