= Alabama's 28th Senate district =

Alabama's 28th State Senate district
Senator
Billy Beasley; D–Clayton
- Demographics: 38.7% White; 52.7% Black; 4.7% Hispanic; 0.6% Asian
- Population (2022): 146,430

Alabama's 28th Senate district is one of 35 districts in the Alabama Senate. The district has been represented by Billy Beasley since 2010.

== Geography ==
Election	Map	Counties in District
2026; 2022		Barbour, Bullock, Henry, Macon, portions of Houston, Russell
2018		Barbour, Bullock, Henry, Macon, portions of Houston, Russell
2014		Barbour, Bullock, Henry, Macon, portions of Houston, Lee, Russell
2010; 2006; 2002		Barbour, Bullock, Henry, Macon, portions of Lee, Russell

== Election history ==
=== Elections in the 2020s ===
Alabama Senate election, 2022: Senate District 28
Party	Candidate	Votes	%	±%
Democratic	Billy Beasley (Incumbent)	21,252	80.72	−16.75
Libertarian	David Boatwright	4,837	18.37	+18.37
Write-in		240	0.91	-1.62
Majority		16,415	62.35	−32.59
Turnout		26,329		
Democratic hold				

=== Elections in the 2010s ===
Alabama Senate election, 2018: Senate District 28
Party	Candidate	Votes	%	±%
Democratic	Billy Beasley (Incumbent)	28,445	97.47	+24.16
Write-in		738	2.53	+2.38
Majority		27,707	94.94	+48.18
Turnout		29,183		
Democratic hold				

Alabama Senate election, 2014: Senate District 28
Party	Candidate	Votes	%	±%
Democratic	Billy Beasley (Incumbent)	22,148	73.31	+2.96
Republican	John Savage	8,020	26.55	−3.03
Write-in		44	0.15	+0.08
Majority		14,128	46.76	+5.99
Turnout		30,212		
Democratic hold				

Alabama Senate election, 2010: Senate District 28
Party	Candidate	Votes	%	±%
Democratic	Billy Beasley	28,619	70.35	−28.59
Republican	Kim West	12,033	29.58	+29.58
Write-in		27	0.07	-0.99
Majority		16,586	40.77	−57.10
Turnout		40,679		
Democratic hold				

=== Elections in the 2000s ===
Alabama Senate election, 2006: Senate District 28
Party	Candidate	Votes	%	±%
Democratic	Myron Penn (Incumbent)	23,413	98.94	+13.49
Write-in		252	1.06	+0.92
Majority		23,161	97.87	+26.82
Turnout		23,665		
Democratic hold				

Alabama Senate election, 2002: Senate District 28
Party	Candidate	Votes	%	±%
Democratic	Myron Penn	26,106	85.45	−13.77
Libertarian	Daniel Bowden	4,400	14.40	+14.40
Write-in		44	0.14	-0.64
Majority		21,706	71.05	−27.40
Turnout		30,550		
Democratic hold				

=== Elections in the 1990s ===
Alabama Senate election, 1998: Senate District 28
Party	Candidate	Votes	%	±%
Democratic	George H. Clay (Incumbent)	26,938	99.22	+33.97
Write-in		211	0.78	+0.72
Majority		26,727	98.45	+53.45
Turnout		27,149		
Democratic hold				

Alabama Senate election, 1994: Senate District 28
Party	Candidate	Votes	%	±%
Democratic	George H. Clay	17,991	65.25	−7.51
Republican	H. Settler	5,583	20.25	−6.99
Independent	J. Riley	3,983	14.45	+14.45
Write-in		16	0.06	+0.06
Majority		12,408	45.00	
Turnout		27,573		
Democratic hold				

Alabama Senate election, 1990: Senate District 28
Party	Candidate	Votes	%	±%
Democratic	Danny Corbett (Incumbent)	19,046	72.76	−27.24
Republican	Randolph Hall	7,131	27.24	+27.24
Majority		11,915	45.52	−54.48
Turnout		26,177		
Democratic hold				

=== Elections in the 1980s ===
Alabama Senate election, 1986: Senate District 28
Party	Candidate	Votes	%	±%
Democratic	Danny Corbett (Incumbent)	18,930	100.00	+43.90
Majority		18,930	100.00	+87.80
Turnout		18,930		
Democratic hold				

Alabama Senate election, 1983: Senate District 28
Party	Candidate	Votes	%	±%
Democratic	Danny Corbett	9,818	56.10	−43.90
Independent	Calvin Biggers	7,683	43.90	+43.90
Majority		2,135	12.20	−87.80
Turnout		17,501		
Democratic hold				

Alabama Senate election, 1982: Senate District 28
Party	Candidate	Votes	%	±%
Democratic	Wendell Mitchell	22,537	100.00	
Majority		22,537	100.00	
Turnout		22,537		
Democratic hold				

== District officeholders ==
Senators take office at midnight on the day of their election.

- Billy Beasley (2010–present)
- Myron Penn (2002–2010)
- George H. Clay (1994–2002)
- Danny Corbett (1983–1994)
- Wendell Mitchell (1982–1983)
- Cordy Taylor (1978–1982)
- Wendell Mitchell (1974–1978)

Not in use 1966–1974.

- Vaughan Robison (1950–1966)
