= Oscar Peden =

American politician (d. 2018)

Member of the Alabama Senate from the 1st district
- In office February 1, 1977 – November 8, 1978
- Preceded by: Ronnie Flippo
- Succeeded by: Bobby E. Denton

Member of the Florence city commission
- In office October 1, 1970 – October 4, 1976
- Preceded by: William Mapes
- Succeeded by: John C. Hamm

Personal details
- Born: Oscar Ray Peden; 1933 or 1934
- Died: May 13, 2018 (aged 84)
- Party: Democratic; Independent

Oscar Ray Peden (1933 or 1934 – May 13, 2018) was an American businessman and politician who served in the Alabama Senate from Alabama's 1st Senate district, representing Lauderdale County and portions of Colbert County and Franklin County. In an electoral upset, he defeated Democratic state representative Jimmy Hunt, who was backed by Governor George Wallace, for the state senate in a February 1977 special election while running as an independent Democrat. Hunt had been hand-picked by the State Democratic Executive Committee for its nomination in lieu of a primary. Peden was a vocal critic of Wallace during his tenure in the chamber. Peden ran for re-election for a full term as a Democrat in 1978 but lost the Democratic nomination to Bobby E. Denton. Peden had previously served as a member of the city commission of Florence, Alabama for two three-year terms from 1970 to 1976. Peden was the last independent member of the Alabama Senate until the 1983 statewide special election.

Peden was first elected to the Florence city commission as commissioner of streets and sanitation in 1970, succeeding incumbent commissioner William Mapes, who was retiring. Peden was re-elected in 1973 and did not seek re-election in 1976. He unsuccessfully ran for commission and the newly created office of mayor in 1979 and 1983, respectively. Peden reportedly considered standing for election to the Alabama Public Service Commission in 1982.

== Electoral history ==
| Election | Winner | | | Runners-up | | | | | |
Mayor of Florence, Alabama
| 1983 prim | Eddie Frost (NP) → | 4,222 | 31.73% | Clyde Bohannon (NP) → | 2,892 | 21.73% | Oscar Peden (NP); 2 others (Note: Jean Gay Mussleman: 2,399 votes, 18.03%; Mary Hawkins: 1,147 votes, 8.62%) | 2,646; 3,546 | 19.88% 26.65% |
Florence, Alabama city commission
| 1979 prim | Dick Jordan (NP) ✓ | 2,652 | 58.11% | Oscar Peden (NP) | 1,912 | 41.89% | — | | |
Alabama Senate, 1st district
| 1978 prim ro | Bobby E. Denton (D) ✓ | 15,490 | 56.02% | Oscar Peden (D, inc.) | 12,162 | 43.98% | — | | |
| 1978 prim | Bobby E. Denton (D) → | 9,837 | 39.81% | Oscar Peden (D, inc.) → | 8,048 | 32.57% | Bob Hill (D) | 6,825 | 27.62% |
| 1977 sp | Oscar Peden (I) ✓ | 6,009 | 52.44% | Jimmy Hunt (D) | 5,449 | 47.56% | — | | |
Florence, Alabama city commission
| 1973 ro | Oscar Peden (NP) ✓ | 3,256 | 52.01% | Greg Watson (NP) | 3,004 | 47.99% | — | | |
| 1973 prim | Oscar Peden (NP) → | 1,857 | 45.44% | Greg Watson (NP) → | 1,824 | 44.63% | 2 others (Note: Billy R. Hill: 288 votes, 7.05%; Homer W. Stevenson: 118 votes, 2.89%) | 406 | 9.93% |
| 1970 ro | Oscar Peden (NP) ✓ | 3,248 | 56.35% | Bert Norton Jr. (NP) | 2,516 | 43.65% | — | | |
| 1970 prim | Oscar Peden (NP) → | 1,767 | 41.09% | Bert Norton Jr. (NP) → | 954 | 22.19% | 5 others (Note: William Hallmark: 527 votes, 12.26%; Jim Mardis: 478 votes, 11.12%; Carmel Olive: 305 votes, 7.09%; Paul Dyar: 197 votes, 4.58%; James Simons: 72 votes, 1.67%) | 1,579 | 36.72% |

== See also ==
- Third-party members of state legislatures of the United States
