= 1986 Alabama Commissioner of Agriculture and Industries election =

- November 4, 1986
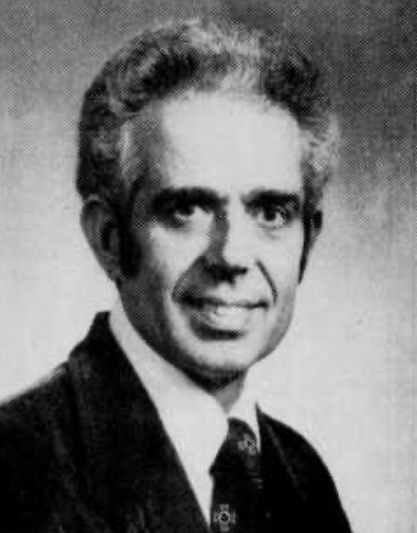
Candidate	Albert McDonald
Party	Democratic
Popular vote	702,180
Percentage	100.00%
- County results McDonald: 90-100%

The 1986 Alabama Commissioner of Agriculture and Industries election was held on November 4, 1986 to elect the Alabama Commissioner of Agriculture and Industries. Albert McDonald won re-election to a second term.

== Democratic primary ==
No primary was held, as only one candidate filed to run as a Democrat.

=== Candidates ===
- Albert McDonald, incumbent commissioner (1983–present)

=== Endorsements ===
Albert McDonald

Organizations

- Alabama Democratic Conference

== General election ==
=== Results ===
1986 Alabama Commissioner of Agriculture and Industries election
Party	Candidate	Votes	%
Democratic	Albert McDonald	702,180	100.00
Total votes		702,180	100.00
