= 1982 Alabama Commissioner of Agriculture and Industries election =

- November 2, 1982
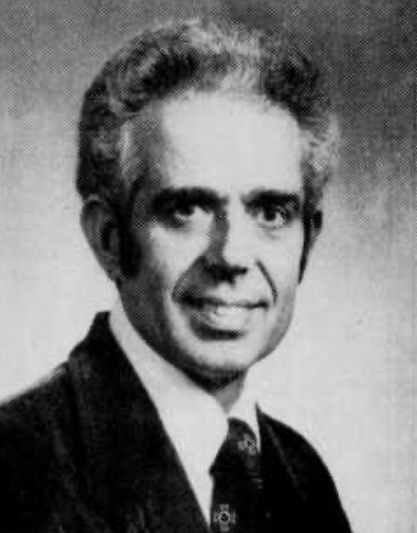
Candidate	Albert McDonald
Party	Democratic
Percentage	100.0%
Commissioner before election
McMillan Lane
Democratic
Elected Commissioner
Albert McDonald
Democratic

The 1982 Alabama Commissioner of Agriculture and Industries election was held on November 2, 1982, to elect the Alabama Commissioner of Agriculture and Industries. State senator Albert McDonald defeated four candidates in the Democratic primary and won the general election unopposed.

== Democratic primary ==
=== Candidates ===
==== Nominee ====
- Albert McDonald, state senator from the 6th district (1974–1982)

==== Eliminated in runoff ====
- John "Bubba" Trotman, businessman

==== Eliminated in primary ====
- Cecil Davis, public administrator
- Jeff Dean, employee at the department of agriculture
- Jack Folsom, furniture businessman and son of former governor Jim Folsom

=== Results ===
Democratic primary
Party	Candidate	Votes	%
Democratic	Albert McDonald	267,061	34.57
Democratic	Bubba Trotman	197,183	25.53
Democratic	Jack Folsom	143,188	18.54
Democratic	Cecil Davis	122,267	15.83
Democratic	Jeff Dean	42,717	5.53
Total votes		772,416	100.00

=== Runoff ===
==== Results ====
Democratic primary runoff
Party	Candidate	Votes	%
Democratic	Albert McDonald	530,218	61.47
Democratic	Bubba Trotman	332,386	38.53
Total votes		862,604	100.00

== General election ==
=== Results ===
1982 Alabama Commissioner of Agriculture and Industries election
Party	Candidate	Votes	%
Democratic	Albert McDonald		100.00
Total votes			100.00
