= Johnny Ford =

American politician

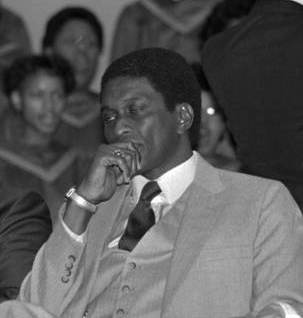

Mayor of Tuskegee, Alabama
- In office 2012–2016
- Preceded by: Omar Neal
- Succeeded by: Lawrence F. Haygood, Jr.
- In office 2004–2008
- Preceded by: Lucenia Williams Dunn
- Succeeded by: Omar Neal
- In office 1972–1996
- Preceded by: Charles M. Keever
- Succeeded by: Ronald D. Williams

Personal details
- Born: August 23, 1942 (age 83) Midway, Alabama, U.S.
- Party: Democratic (before–2003; 2010–present); Republican (2003–2010)

Johnny L. Ford (born August 23, 1942) is an American politician who is a former mayor of Tuskegee, Alabama and Alabama State Representative.

== Early life and education ==
He was raised as a child and attended elementary school in Tuskegee. Ford is a graduate of Tuskegee Institute High School. Ford received his B.A. in History and Sociology from Knoxville College and his Master's of Public Administration from Auburn University Montgomery, and has received four Honorary Doctorate Degrees.

== Personal life ==
Ford is Catholic, and married a White woman in a Roman Catholic ceremony at a time when miscegenation was still illegal in Alabama. They have three children: John, Christopher, and Tiffany.

== Political career ==
Ford was first elected mayor of Tuskegee in 1972. He was, along with Algernon J. Cooper of Prichard, elected the first black mayors of cities of more than 10,000 people in the modern era in Alabama in 1972 (although Hobson City had been black-run since its incorporation in 1899, but it was a smaller community). After serving six terms as mayor, Ford was defeated in 1996 by Ronald D. Williams, a former political aide. Two years later in 1998, Ford ran for and won State Representative of the 82nd District from Macon County. He served from 1999 until 2004. In February 2003, he switched to the Republican Party, becoming Alabama's first black Republican in the state legislature in more than 100 years.

Preferring to serve in his old office as mayor, he resigned from the legislature and was elected mayor in 2004, defeating the first black woman mayor of Tuskegee, Lucenia Williams Dunn by a 54-46% margin. Facing a tough reelection to an 8th non-consecutive term in 2008, which featured 5 candidates, challenger Omar Neal led in the August municipal election by just 12 votes (927 to 915) over Ford. Credited with turning out the "youth vote" from Tuskegee University, Neal defeated Ford by a 54-46% margin (1,463 to 1,270), in a higher turnout October runoff. As of 2015, Tuskegee has not reelected a mayor to a consecutive term since Ford won his sixth term in 1992.

Ford is the founder and Director General of the World Conference of Mayors and also serves as President of Johnny Ford and Associates, Inc. Ford is the President-emeritus and Founder of the National Conference of Black Mayors. He was appointed to the Presidential Advisory Committee on Federalism and the U.S. Intergovernmental Policy Advisory Committee on Trade. Ford is also a past President of the Alabama League of Municipalities, is a member of Kappa Alpha Psi, and the founding President of the Tuskegee Optimist Club.

Ford rejoined the Democratic party and ran for the open state Senate district 28 in 2010 (incumbent Myron Penn retired). Though it is a majority-minority seat, he lost the run-off election to Billy Beasley, who is white, and the brother of former Lieutenant Governor Jere Beasley.

In 2012, Ford ran again for his old job as Tuskegee mayor and in the August primary, he defeated 1st term Mayor Neal by a margin of 57-38% (with 3rd candidate Lula Pearl-Franklin pulling the remaining 5%) and as a result, did not require a run-off. He was then sworn in to an unprecedented 8th non-consecutive term as mayor.

Preceded by Charles M. Keever	Mayor of Tuskegee, Alabama; 1972 — 1996	Succeeded by Ronald D. Williams
Preceded by Lucenia Williams Dunn	Mayor of Tuskegee, Alabama; 2004 — 2008	Succeeded by Omar Neal
Preceded by Omar Neal	Mayor of Tuskegee, Alabama; 2012 — 2016	Succeeded by Lawrence F. Haygood, Jr.
