= 1990 Alabama Commissioner of Agriculture and Industries election =

- November 6, 1990
Candidate	A. W. Todd	Stan McDonald
Party	Democratic	Republican
Popular vote	605,041	482,233
Percentage	55.65%	44.35%
- County results Todd: 50–60% 60–70% 70–80% 80–90% McDonald: 50–60% 70–80%

The 1990 Alabama Commissioner of Agriculture and Industries election was held on November 6, 1990 to elect the Alabama Commissioner of Agriculture and Industries. Albert McDonald was term-limited and ineligible to run for a third term.

== Democratic primary ==
=== Candidates ===
==== Nominee ====
- A.W. Todd

==== Eliminated in primary ====
- Horace Horn, pharmaceutical employee
- B. A. "Plowboy" Real

=== Results ===
Democratic primary
Party	Candidate	Votes	%
Democratic	Horace Horn	256,374	45.20
Democratic	A.W. Todd	206,464	36.40
Democratic	B. A. "Plowboy" Real	104,375	18.40
Total votes		567,213	100.00

=== Runoff ===
==== Results ====
Democratic primary runoff
Party	Candidate	Votes	%
Democratic	A.W. Todd	270,240	51.71
Democratic	Horace Horn	252,385	48.29
Total votes		522,625	100.00

== Republican primary ==
=== Candidates ===
==== Nominee ====
- Stan McDonald, attorney

== General election ==
=== Results ===
1990 Alabama Commissioner of Agriculture and Industries election
Party	Candidate	Votes	%
Democratic	A.W. Todd	605,041	55.65
Republican	Stan McDonald	482,233	44.35
Total votes		1,087,274	100.00
