= 1976 Alabama Democratic presidential primary =

- May 4, 1976 (first round); May 25, 1976 (runoff)

35 Democratic National Convention delegates (27 pledged, 8 unpledged)
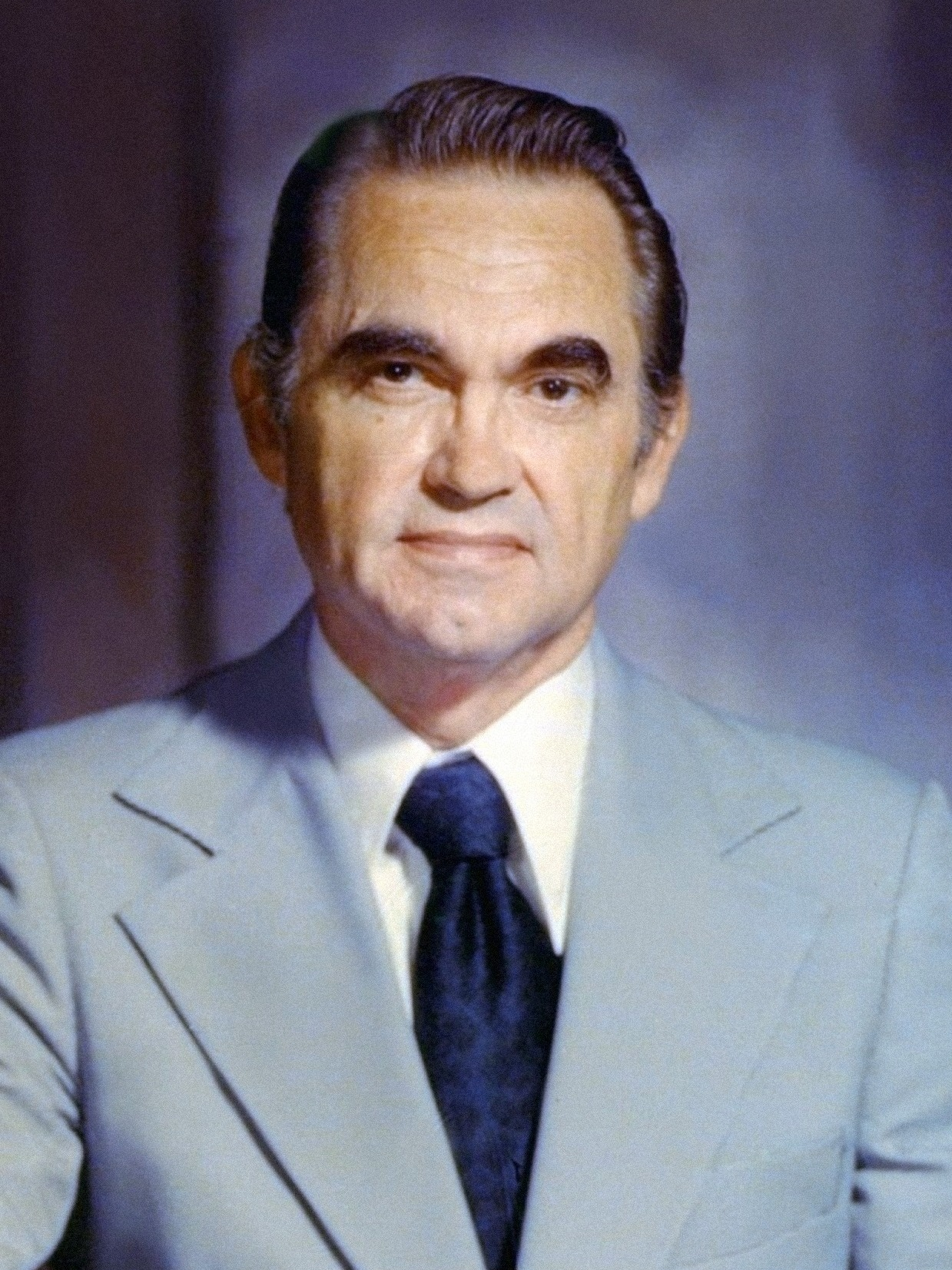

Candidate	George Wallace	Uncommitted	Jimmy Carter
Home state	Alabama	—	Georgia
Delegate count	27	5	3
First round	17 delegates	2 delegates	0 delegates
Runoff	49,314; 45.06% 4 delegates	16,411; 15.00% 2 delegates	43,713; 39.94% 2 delegates
- Allegiance of winning district delegates George Wallace Jimmy Carter Uncommitted

A presidential primary was held in the U.S. state of Alabama on May 4, 1976, with runoff elections on May 25 to elect delegates representing Alabama to the 1976 Democratic National Convention. In order to choose the state's thirty-five delegates, the state was divided up into twenty-seven delegate districts based on state house lines. Delegate districts were made up by grouping together three to five state house districts, based on their voting strength for national Democratic presidential nominees in 1968 and 1972, with weaker districts containing more House districts. The remaining eight delegates were hand-picked by the state Executive Democratic Committee in proportion to the winner's share of the popular vote. Governor of Alabama George Wallace won a large majority of the state's delegates.

In the first round of the primary, nineteen were elected outright, seventeen pledged to Governor George Wallace and two uncommitted, both of whom were Black state legislators. In the runoff, Wallace picked up four more delegates, two more uncommitted delegates were nominated, and Governor of Georgia and eventual nominee Jimmy Carter won his only two district delegates. In response to the primary results, the Committee was set to choose six Wallace delegates, one uncommitted delegate, and one Carter delegate at a convention. Wowever, Wallace withdrew from the race and threw his support behind Carter before the Committee could convene.

== Results ==
Alabama Democratic presidential primary, 1976
Candidate	Delegates		
Candidate	Pl.	Unpl.	Total
George Wallace	21	6	27
Uncommitted	4	1	5
Jimmy Carter	2	1	3
Frank Church	0	0	0
Fred R. Harris	0	0	0
Hubert Humphrey	0	0	0
Mo Udall	0	0	0

=== First round winners by district ===
District	Elected delegate	Pledged to
1st	James Hunt	Wallace
5th	Sen. Robert T. Wilson	Wallace
6th	Sen. Bingham Edwards	Wallace
7th	Rep. Kerry Rich	Wallace
8th	Rep. Ed Robertson	Wallace
10th	Rep. Tony Harrison	Uncommitted
11th	Rep. Jack Biddle	Wallace
14th	James M. Campbell	Wallace
15th	John Hollis Jackson Jr.	Wallace
16th	Rep. Larry Morris	Wallace
17th	Rep. Rick Manley	Wallace
18th	Earl Goodwin	Wallace
20th	Charles M. Crook	Wallace
22nd	Joe McCorquodale III	Wallace
23rd	Wallace Miller	Wallace
24th	Mrs. S. A. Cherry	Wallace
25th	Rep. Tommy Sandusky	Wallace
26th	Rep. Cain Kennedy	Uncommitted
27th	Mrs. L. W. Noonan	Wallace
Source: The Birmingham Post-Herald

=== Runoff results by district ===
District	George Wallace			Jimmy Carter			Uncommitted			Total
District	Candidate	Votes	%	Candidate	Votes	%	Candidate	Votes	%	Total
2nd	Mrs. Albert McDonald	12,265	56.52%	Timothy W. Hudson	9,435	43.48%	—	—	—	21,700
3rd	Rep. Hartwell Lutz	8,963	47.14%	Charles Cummings Jr.	10,051	52.86%	—	—	—	19,014
4th	George M. Barnett	9,846	54.25%	Carol G. Richards	8,302	45.75%	—	—	—	18,148
9th	Joni Meeks	5,535	50.58%	Charles J. McClees	5,407	49.42%	—	—	—	10,942
12th	—	—	—	Rep. Ron Jackson	3,829	48.46%	Sen. J. Richmond Pearson	4,073	51.54%	7,902
13th	Rep. Bob Gafford	5,154	66.44%	Mark Polson	2,603	33.56%	—	—	—	7,757
19th	—	—	—	Herman Harris	4,086	51.58%	Rep. Alvin Holmes	3,835	48.42%	7,921
21st	Sen. Dudley Perry	7,551	47.04%	—	—	—	Rep. Thomas Reed	8,503	52.96%	16,054
Source: Alabama Official and Statistical Register, 1979 (p. 239–241)

== See also ==
- 1976 Democratic Party presidential primaries
- 1976 United States presidential election
- 1976 United States presidential election in Alabama
- 1976 United States elections
