= Tim Melson =

American politician (born 1960)

Member of the Alabama Senate from the 1st district
- Incumbent
- Assumed office November 5, 2014
- Preceded by: Tammy Irons

Personal details
- Born: Timothy Ivan Melson; 1960 (age 65–66) Alabama, U.S.
- Spouse: Lynn Melson (m. 1980)
- Children: 3
- Education: University of North Alabama (BS); University of Alabama at Birmingham (MD)
- Profession: Physician

Timothy Ivan Melson (born 1960) is an American politician and physician. A member of the Republican Party, he serves in the Alabama Senate, representing its 1st district since 2014.

== Early life and career ==
Melson was born and raised in Alabama, and grew up in Florence, Alabama. He is a graduate of the University of North Alabama, where he attained a Bachelor of Science in professional biology and general chemistry in 1982. After graduation, he attended medical school at the University of Alabama at Birmingham, from which he received his MD.

Melson practiced medicine as an anesthesiologist at Helen Keller Hospital in Florence. He was the chief of anesthesia there from 1993 to 2008, in addition to serving on the board of directors at the Florence Surgery Center. Melson retired from anesthesiology after a medical emergency which he described as a "close call"; Melson was suffering from liver failure and required a liver transplant and a heart transplant. Melson received a "life-saving" operation in 2009 from a doctor in Pittsburgh who predicted that a new liver would also resolve his heart issues. After his retirement from general practice, Melson became the owner of Shoals Medical Trials, a medical business working in clinical trials.

== Alabama Senate ==
In 2014, Democratic state senator Tammy Irons retired, leaving the first district open in that year's election cycle. Melson announced his candidacy for the state senate in March 2014, saying he would focus on economic and workforce development, as well as improving health care access and quality in Alabama. He described the Affordable Care Act as a "disaster" and a "federal government takeover of health care". The Republican primary advanced to a runoff between Melson and Chris Seibert, a city councilman from Athens, Alabama. Melson defeated Seibert in the runoff, in which he strongly carried Lauderdale County. Melson defeated Democratic nominee Mike Curtis in the general election with 62% of the vote.

During his first term as state senator, Melson voted against a gaming bill in the Tourism Committee in August 2015. In 2018, he sponsored a bill clarifying that 18-year-olds could be committed to psychiatric facilities by probate judges when entering insanity pleas. He also contributed to the expansion of U.S. Route 43 in north Alabama. Melson was re-elected to a second term in office in 2018 against Democratic nominee Caroline Self, with Melson receiving 68% of the vote. During his reelection campaign, Melson described himself as someone who would continue to "uphold conservative ideals", including anti-abortion measures and pro-gun and Second Amendment protections.

Melson was the author of a bill successfully legalizing medical cannabis in Alabama, having first introduced it in 2019. Melson said that the bill was designed to help people at the end of their life, though he still opposed recreational use of marijuana. Although the medical cannabis bill was opposed by Steve Marshall, the Attorney General of Alabama, it eventually passed in the Alabama Legislature in May 2021. The bill was signed into law by Governor Kay Ivey the same month. The law also established the Alabama Medical Cannabis Commission, which regulates licenses to distributors of medical cannabis, though it has encountered various lawsuits since its founding.

Melson was reelected to a third term as state senator in the 2022 election cycle. In the Republican primary, Melson was challenged by John Sutherland, who had previously sued the Lauderdale County Agricultural Authority, of which Melson was the chairman. Melson defeated Sutherland in the primary with 69% of the vote, and was uncontested in the general election, with no Democratic candidate qualifying for the race. As of 2023, Melson served as the chair of the state senate's Health Care Committee.

Following a 2024 ruling by the Alabama Supreme Court that frozen embryos could be considered children, Melson said he was planning to file a bill that would protect in vitro fertilisation, as many IVF clinics in the state had suspended operations in reaction to the ruling. Melson's legislation would provide clarification in the law that embryos would not be considered viable until being implanted in the uterus.

== Personal life ==
Melson has been married to his wife Lynn since 1980. As of 2017, they had three children and four grandchildren. Melson is a farmer and hobbyist cattleman, and is a member of the National Rifle Association of America.

While on a business recruiting trip to South Korea in July 2023, Melson suffered a major cardiac emergency. His daughter, Ellie Melson, said that he had suffered cardiac arrest and was in critical condition. John Wahl, the chair of the Alabama Republican Party, said that Melson had suffered a heart attack, which can result in cardiac arrest. Fellow state senator Arthur Orr was on the trip with Melson and administered CPR. Melson was hospitalized in South Korea for two weeks; he returned home to Alabama on August 14, 2023, to continue his recovery.
