= Bryan Taylor (politician) =

American politician (born 1976)

Member of the Alabama Senate from the 30th district
- In office November 3, 2010 – November 4, 2014
- Preceded by: Wendell Mitchell
- Succeeded by: Clyde Chambliss

Personal details
- Born: Bryan McDaniel Taylor; March 2, 1976 (age 50) Pensacola, Florida, U.S.
- Party: Republican
- Children: 3
- Education: University of Alabama (B.A.); University of Texas School of Law (J.D.)
- Occupation: Lawyer
- Website: www.bryantaylor.us

Military service
- Allegiance: United States
- Branch/service: United States Army
- Years of service: 1998-2002 (Army Reserve); 2002-2006 (Active Army); 2006-Present (National Guard)
- Rank: Major, Judge Advocate
- Unit: 17th Field Artillery Brigade; Alabama National Guard
- Battles/wars: Iraq Campaign
- Awards: Bronze Star Medal

Bryan McDaniel Taylor (born March 2, 1976) is an American lawyer and former Alabama state senator. Before returning to private practice in January 2020, Taylor was general counsel to the governor of Alabama, Kay Ivey. Taylor was policy director and counsel to Gov. Bob Riley before being elected to the Alabama Senate in 2010. Taylor began his legal career as an active duty Army judge advocate and served a combat tour in Iraq. Prior to joining the Ivey Administration, Taylor was general counsel for the Alabama Department of Finance, the cabinet-level agency responsible for the state's fiscal management and overall administration.

In the 2010 election cycle that saw the Republicans in Alabama win control of the State Legislature for the first time since Reconstruction, Taylor was elected to the Alabama Senate over the seven-term incumbent Wendell Mitchell (D-Luverne), becoming the first Republican ever to represent the 30th District. Taylor is "perhaps best known as the author of Alabama’s new ethics law." Taylor was an advocate for legislative term limits. He decided not to run for re-election in 2014, saying he wanted to "focus on family and [his] private sector career." He is succeeded by Clyde Chambliss (R-Prattville, Ala.).

Taylor ran for the position of Chief Justice of the Supreme Court of Alabama in the 2024 elections, saying that there are "too many out of control liberal judges", and that he is the true conservative candidate.
