= Billy Beasley =

American politician

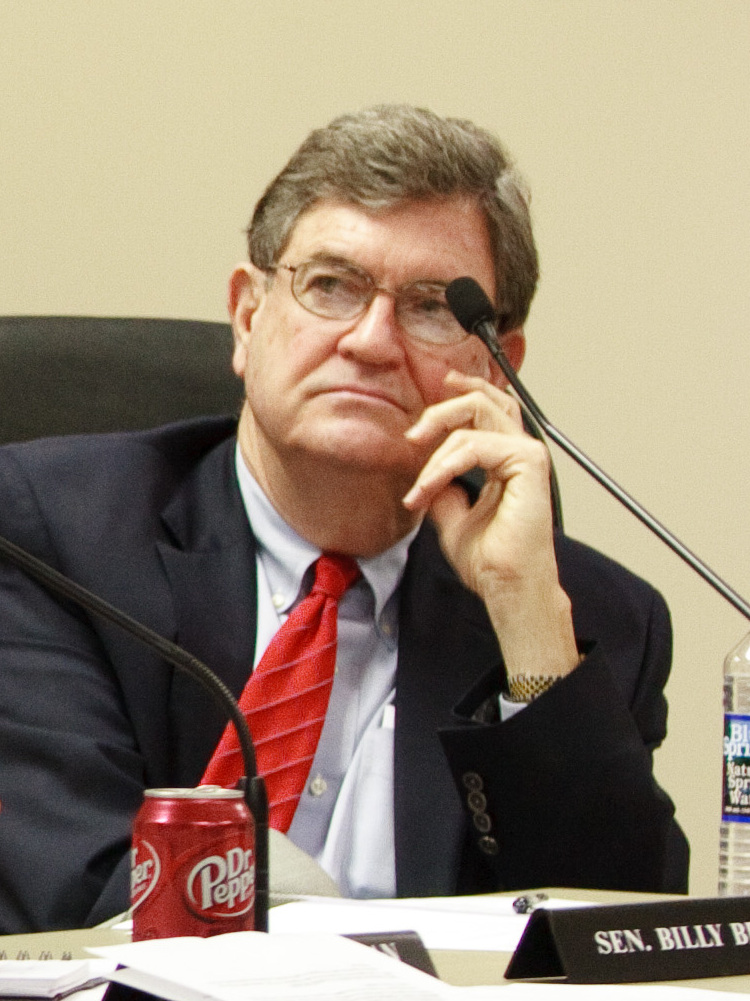
- Beasley at a public hearing in 2012

Minority Leader of the Alabama Senate
- In office October 5, 2017 – January 8, 2019
- Preceded by: Quinton Ross
- Succeeded by: Bobby Singleton

Member of the Alabama Senate from the 28th district
- Incumbent
- Assumed office November 3, 2010
- Preceded by: Myron Penn

Member of the Alabama House of Representatives from the 84th district
- In office 1998 – November 3, 2010
- Preceded by: James S. Clark
- Succeeded by: Berry Forte

Personal details
- Born: March 19, 1940 (age 86)
- Party: Democratic
- Relatives: Jere Beasley (brother)
- Education: Auburn University (BS)

William M. Beasley (born March 19, 1940) is an American politician from the state of Alabama. He is a Democratic member of the Alabama Senate, representing the 28th district.

== Biography ==
Beasley graduated from Auburn University in 1962. Prior to his state service, he worked as a pharmacist. He was elected to the Alabama House of Representatives in 1998. After being consistently reelected, Beasley ran for the Alabama Senate in 2010, and defeated fellow Democrat Johnny Ford. He succeeded Myron Penn, who did not seek reelection. He considered running for Governor of Alabama in the 2014 election. He was minority leader of the senate in 2017 and 2018.

Beasley is from Clayton, Alabama. His older brother is former Lieutenant Governor of Alabama Jere Beasley.

Beasley is a methodist.

== See also ==
- List of Auburn University people

Alabama Senate
Preceded by Quinton Ross	Minority Leader of the Alabama Senate; 2017–2019	Succeeded by Bobby Singleton
