= Myron Penn =

American politician

Member of the Alabama Senate from the 28th district
- In office 2002 – November 3, 2010
- Succeeded by: Billy Beasley

Personal details
- Born: March 17, 1972 (age 54) Macon County, Alabama
- Party: Democratic
- Spouse: Karen
- Profession: Attorney

Myron Penn (born March 17, 1972) was a Democratic member of the Alabama Senate, representing the 28th District from 2002 to November 3, 2010.

Penn received his Bachelor of Arts from the University of Alabama, and his Juris Doctor from the Cumberland School of Law.

Penn opted not to run for reelection to the Alabama Senate in 2010.
