= Lowell Barron =

American politician

President pro tempore of the Alabama Senate
- In office January 12, 1999 – January 9, 2007
- Preceded by: Dewayne Freeman
- Succeeded by: Hinton Mitchem

Member of the Alabama Senate from the 8th district
- In office November 3, 1982 – November 3, 2010
- Preceded by: James LeMaster
- Succeeded by: Shadrack McGill

Personal details
- Born: Lowell Ray Barron; April 22, 1942 (age 84) Jackson County, Alabama, U.S.
- Party: Democratic
- Education: Auburn University (BS)
- Profession: Pharmacist; businessman

Lowell Ray Barron is a former Democratic politician, businessman who was a member of the Alabama Senate, and represented the 8th District from 1982 to 2010. He was elected President Pro Tem of the Alabama Senate from 1999 to 2007, and after having serving seven terms in the state Senate, was defeated by 628 votes in the 2010 general election by Republican Shadrack McGill. Alabama's 8th Senate district includes all of Jackson County and parts of DeKalb and Madison Counties.

== Early life and education ==
He was born in Jackson County, received his Bachelor of Science degree in pharmacy from Auburn University and, in 1965, opened a pharmacy in Fyffe.

== Career ==
He was elected Mayor of Fyffe in 1968, a position he held until 1982, when he was first elected to the Alabama Senate.

New elections for the state Senate and House were held in 1983 after district lines were redrawn, and the Alabama Democratic Party picked nominees rather than holding new primary elections. After his first year in the Senate, he was not selected as the Democratic nominee. Subsequently, he waged the state's first and only successful write-in campaign for the Alabama Legislature and won the Democratic nomination. He encouraged people to write in "Lowell Barron" with the "itty bitty pencils" which his campaign distributed, and his write-in campaign still stands as one of the most successful in American history. While the Senate district contained three counties (DeKalb, Jackson and parts of Madison), he received write-in votes in 26 of Alabama's 67 counties.

He was elected by the full Senate as president pro tempore for two terms (1999–2007). In 1999, the Democratic-held legislature stripped much of the powers of the Republican Lieutenant Governor of Alabama, who was the presiding officer of the Alabama Senate. Senators changed the Senate rules to give those much of those powers it to the President Pro Tempore, which increased Barron's influence. Barron was reelected as President Pro Tem in 2003. After the 2006 elections, Barron did not run for Pro Tem but instead was appointed chair of the powerful Senate Rules Committee. Democratic Senator Hinton Mitchem succeeded Barron as Pro Tem in 2007.

Barron made national and international news in June 2007 when fellow Senator Charles Bishop, a Republican Senator and former Democratic Senate Rules Chairman in the 1980s, hit Barron while on the Senate floor. According to the Birmingham News Bishop accused Barron of using profanity after Bishop (R-Jasper) confronted Barron on floor of the Senate. Barron was working on a Senate Rules Committee report when Bishop became angered because, in a procedural move, he had lost his turn to debate the issue pending before the Senate when Senator Pat Lindsey (D-Butler) was presiding. Bishop punched Barron in the face, and fellow Senators, including Parker Griffith (D-Huntsville), Bobby Denton (D-Muscle Shoals) and others, saw the attack and restrained Bishop.

Barron has four children, and eight grandchildren, and resides in Rainsville, Alabama. He is a Baptist. Barron is an Auburn fan and served on the Auburn University Board of Trustees from 1993 to 2003. He lists golf, gardening, family and tennis as his hobbies.

On April 23, 2013, Barron was indicted in DeKalb County Circuit Court on charges of campaign finance law violations. After taking office in January 2011, Alabama Attorney General Luther Strange convened seven grand juries in Jackson County and DeKalb County before obtaining an indictment against Barron by the seventh grand jury in April 2013 on two counts of ethics violations and four counts of Fair Campaign Practices Act violations. In 2014, the Alabama Attorney General lost appeals to the Alabama Court of Criminal Appeals and the Alabama Supreme Court by unanimous rulings of both courts. Subsequently, the Attorney General's office filed a motion in DeKalb County Circuit Court in August 2014 to dismiss all charges against Barron. On August 26, 2014, a DeKalb County Circuit Judge dismissed the indictment against Barron.

== See also ==
- List of Auburn University people
