= G. J. Higginbotham =

American politician

G.J. (Dutch) Higginbotham

Member of the Alabama State Board of Education from the 2nd district
- In office January 3, 1995 – January 3, 2003
- Preceded by: Steadman S. Shealy
- Succeeded by: Betty Peters

Member of the Alabama House of Representatives from the 80th district
- In office January 3, 1987 – January 3, 1995
- Preceded by: John Rice
- Succeeded by: Lesley Vance

Member of the Alabama Senate from the 22nd district
- In office November 8, 1978 – November 3, 1982
- Preceded by: C. C. Torbert Jr.
- Succeeded by: Danny Corbett

Personal details
- Born: February 22, 1920 Calhoun City, Mississippi, U.S.
- Died: December 5, 2010 (aged 90) Opelika, Alabama, U.S.
- Party: Democratic; Republican
- Spouse: Sarah Louise Rhodes (dec.)
- Children: 2 daughters, 2 sons

Girstle Jefferson Higginbotham (February 22, 1920 – December 5, 2010), known as Dutch Higginbotham was an American politician in the state of Alabama. He served in the Alabama House of Representatives from 1966 to 1970, 1974 to 1977, 1986 to 1990, and 1990 to 1994. He also served in the Alabama State Senate from 1977 to 1978 and 1978 to 1982. In the House, he was chairman of the House Judiciary Committee from 1986 to 1994. His entire tenure in the Legislature he was a Democrat. Higginbotham was elected to the Alabama Board of Education in 1994 also as a Democrat. During that term he switched to the Republican Party and was re-elected as a member of the GOP. Born in Calhoun City, Mississippi, he was the son of C.F. and Mary Alice (née Winters) Higginbotham. He was a veteran of World War II and the Korean War, having served in the U.S. Army Reserve, reaching the rank of Colonel. He died at his residence in Opelika, Alabama in 2010 and was buried at Garden Hills Cemetery.
