= Danny Corbett =

American politician (1949–2016)

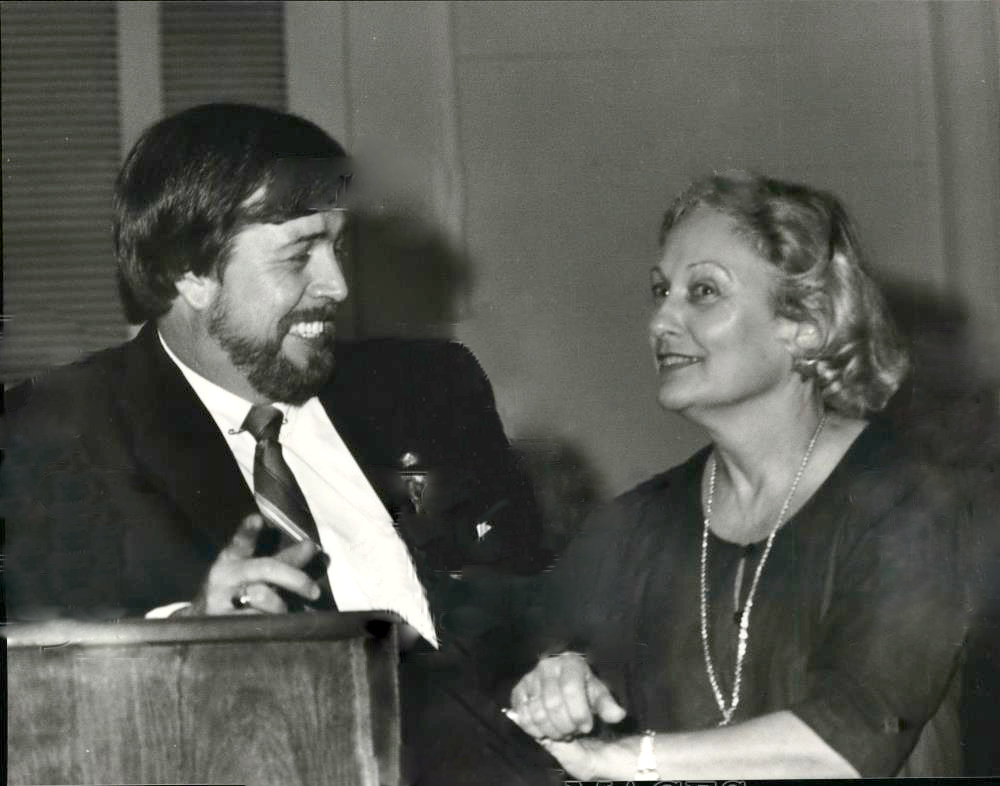
- Corbett (left) with Ann Bedsole, 1985

Member of the Alabama Senate from the 28th district
- In office 1983–1994
- Preceded by: Wendell Mitchell
- Succeeded by: George H. Clay

Personal details
- Born: James Daniel Corbett; May 1, 1949 Columbus, Georgia, U.S.
- Died: December 17, 2016 (aged 67) Phenix City, Alabama, U.S.
- Party: Democratic
- Education: Troy University

James Daniel Corbett (May 1, 1949 – December 17, 2016) was an American politician. A member of the Democratic Party, he served in the Alabama Senate from 1983 to 1994.

== Life and career ==
Corbett was born in Columbus, Georgia, the son of James Alphus Corbett and Alice Marie Hallmark. He attended Troy University, and served in the Army National Guard. He was a real estate agent.

Corbett served in the Alabama Senate from 1983 to 1994, representing the 28th district.

== Death ==
Corbett died on December 17, 2016, in Phenix City, Alabama, at the age of 67.
