= Ryan deGraffenried =

American politician

Ryan deGraffenried Jr.

President pro tempore of the Alabama Senate
- In office January 13, 1987 – November 9, 1994
- Preceded by: John Teague
- Succeeded by: Michael Figures

Member of the Alabama Senate
- In office November 8, 1978 – November 9, 1994
- Preceded by: Richard Shelby
- Succeeded by: Phil Poole
- Constituency: 16th district (1978–1982); 21st district (1982–1994)

Personal details
- Born: April 2, 1950 Tuscaloosa, Alabama, U.S.
- Died: December 7, 2006 (aged 56) Hoover, Alabama, U.S.
- Party: Democratic
- Parent: Ryan deGraffenried Sr. (father)
- Education: University of Alabama (BA); Samford University (LLB)

William Ryan deGraffenried Jr. (April 2, 1950 – December 7, 2006) served as President Pro Tempore of the Alabama State Senate from 1987 to 1994.

== Early life and education ==
DeGraffenried was born in Tuscaloosa, Alabama. He graduated from the University of Alabama and the Cumberland School of Law at Samford University.

== Career ==
DeGraffenried represented Tuscaloosa in the Alabama State Senate from 1978 until 1994 and served as the President Pro Tempore of the Senate, from 1987 until 1994. He was elected to the Senate in a special election when then-State Sen. Richard Shelby was elected to the U.S. House of Representatives to fill the vacancy of Walter Flowers.

After Governor H. Guy Hunt was removed from office due to criminal conviction, the Lieutenant Governor, Jim Folsom, Jr. became the new governor. DeGraffenried, as the President Pro Tempore of the state Senate, became next in line for the governorship for the remainder of the quadrennium.

DeGraffenried ran unsuccessfully for Lieutenant Governor in 1994, losing the Democratic primary to future Governor Don Siegelman. He then returned to practicing law in Tuscaloosa and later became a contract lobbyist.

== Personal life ==
His father, Ryan DeGraffenried Sr., was also an Alabama politician.

He died unexpectedly of undisclosed natural causes in 2006 while attending a conference in Hoover, Alabama, aged 56.

== Electoral history ==
Alabama Senate (16th district), 1982

- Ryan DeGraffenried (D) (inc.) - 20,149 (100.00%)

Alabama Senate (21st district), 1983

- Ryan DeGraffenried (D) (inc.) - 7,164 (100.00%)

Alabama Senate (21st district), 1986

- Ryan DeGraffenried (D) (inc.) - 23,101 (100.00%)

Alabama Senate (21st district), 1990

- Ryan DeGraffenried (D) (inc.) - 24,445 (100.00%)

Lieutenant Governor of Alabama (Democratic primary), 1994

- Don Siegelman - 273,621 (38.62%)
- Ryan DeGraffenried - 260,571 (36.78%)
- George Wallace, Jr. - 174,302 (24.60%)

Lieutenant Governor of Alabama (Democratic primary runoff), 1994

- Don Siegelman - 297,937 (57.32%)
- Ryan DeGraffenried - 221,877 (42.68%)

Source: OurCampaigns.com DeGraffenried page
