= Wendell Mitchell =

American politician (1940–2012)

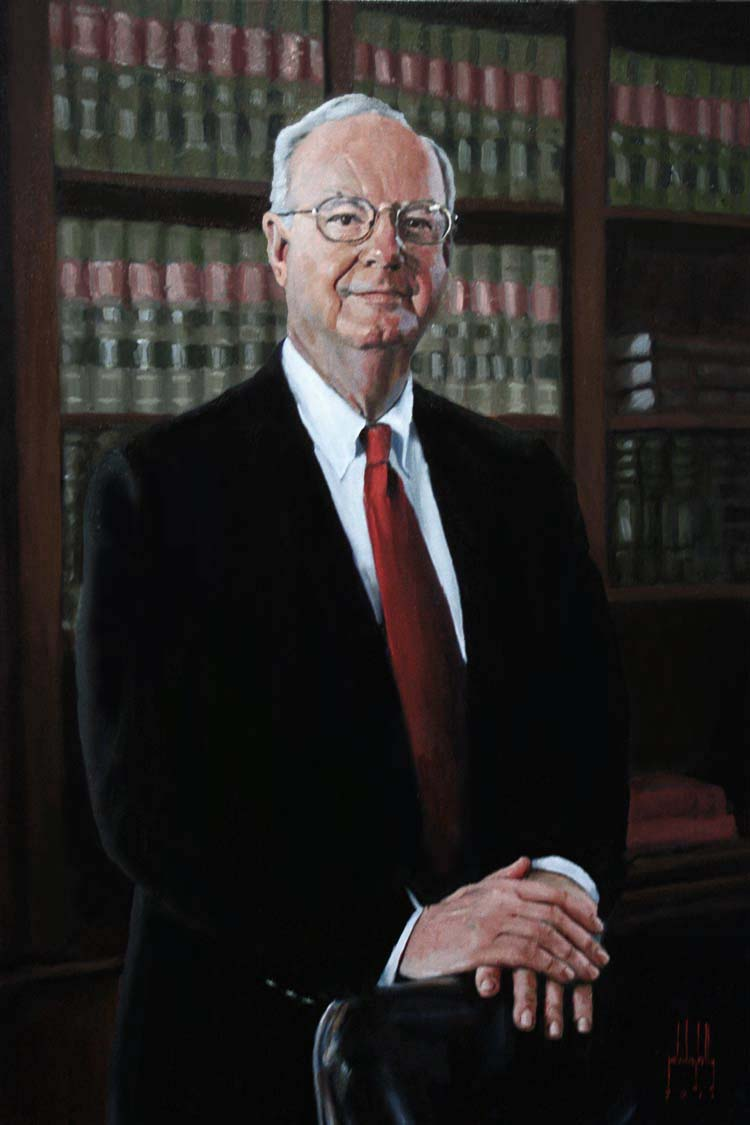
- Portrait of Senator Wendell Mitchell painted by Joel Sidney Kelly

Member of the Alabama Senate
- In office November 6, 1990 – November 2, 2010
- Preceded by: Foy Covington, Jr.
- Succeeded by: Bryan Taylor
- Constituency: 30th district
- In office November 2, 1982 – November 8, 1983
- Preceded by: Cordy Taylor
- Succeeded by: Danny Corbett
- Constituency: 28th district
- In office November 5, 1974 – November 7, 1978
- Preceded by: District created
- Succeeded by: Cordy Taylor
- Constituency: 28th district

Personal details
- Born: September 4, 1940 Montgomery, Alabama, U.S.
- Died: February 4, 2012 (aged 71) Montgomery, Alabama, U.S.
- Party: Democratic
- Spouse: Rosalind
- Profession: Professor of Law at Faulkner University

Wendell Mitchell (September 4, 1940 – February 4, 2012) was a Democratic member of the Alabama Senate, representing the 30th district from 1990 to 2010. He previously represented the 28th district from 1974 to 1978, and again from 1982 to 1983.

== Biography ==
Mitchell was a conservative Democratic senator who was known for working across party lines to build better schools, recruit industry, and fund important projects in his district. In 2007, Mitchell’s colleagues in the Senate voted him to the position of Deputy President Pro Tempore.

Mitchell ran in Alabama's 2nd congressional district in 1978, against the incumbent Republican William L. Dickinson. He was defeated with 46.0% of the vote.

Mitchell was chairman of the standing committee on Governmental Affairs in the Senate and chairman of the Joint House–Senate Committee on Energy. He also served as a voting member of every Senate committee by virtue of his position as Deputy President Pro Tempore.

Mitchell earned a bachelor's degree from Auburn University and a law degree from the University of Alabama. He was a past Dean of Jones Law School at Faulkner University and was still active as a Professor of Law at the institution until his death.

He died of congestive heart failure in February 2012.
