= John Teague (American politician) =

American politician (1944–2023)

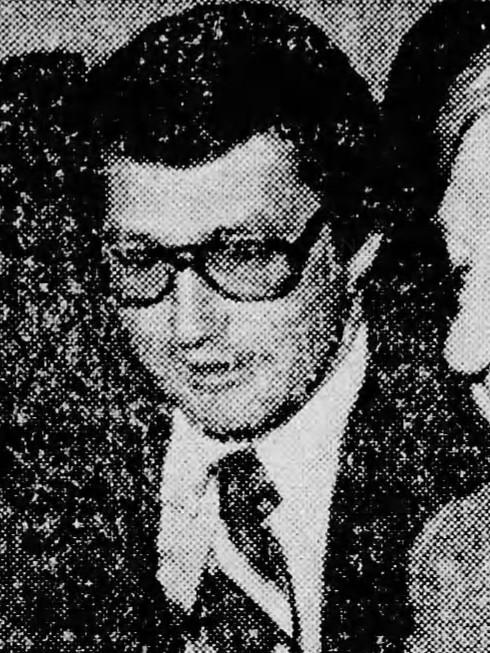

President pro tempore of the Alabama Senate
- In office January 11, 1983 – November 5, 1986
- Preceded by: Finis St. John III
- Succeeded by: Ryan deGraffenried Jr.

Member of the Alabama Senate
- In office September 1, 1976 – November 5, 1986
- Preceded by: Bobby Weaver
- Succeeded by: Jim Preuitt
- Constituency: 19th district (1976–1983); 11th district (1983–1987)

Member of the Alabama House of Representatives from the 55th district
- In office November 6, 1974 – September 1, 1976
- Preceded by: None (district established)
- Succeeded by: Wallace Shoemaker

Personal details
- Born: John Allison Teague; July 9, 1944 Birmingham, Alabama, U.S.
- Died: May 14, 2023 (aged 78)
- Party: Democratic
- Spouse: Tami Ezell

John Allison Teague Sr. (July 9, 1944 – May 14, 2023) was an American politician who served as president pro tempore of the Alabama Senate from 1983 to 1986. He ran for lieutenant governor in 1986, losing in the Democratic Party primary to Jim Folsom Jr.
