= J. Richmond Pearson =

American politician

Member of the Alabama Senate from the 18th district
- In office November 9, 1983 – November 4, 1986
- Preceded by: Lister Hill Proctor
- Succeeded by: Fred Horn

Member of the Alabama Senate from the 13th district
- In office November 6, 1974 – November 9, 1983
- Preceded by: District created
- Succeeded by: Gerald Dial

Personal details
- Born: January 10, 1930 Birmingham, Alabama
- Died: October 22, 2014 (aged 84) Birmingham, Alabama
- Party: Democratic

J. Richmond Pearson (January 10, 1930 – October 22, 2014) was an American politician who served in the Alabama Senate from 1974 to 1986.

He died on October 22, 2014, in Birmingham, Alabama at age 84.
