= Albert McDonald =

American politician

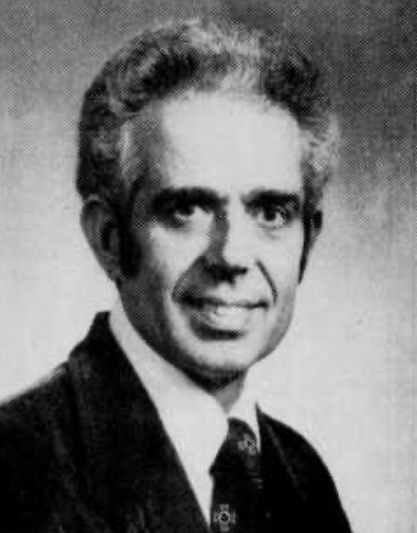
- McDonald in 1974

Agriculture Commissioner of Alabama
- In office 1983–1991
- Governor: George Wallace; H. Guy Hunt
- Preceded by: McMillan Lane
- Succeeded by: A. W. Todd

Albert Clyde McDonald (September 15, 1930 – July 6, 2014) was an American politician and member of the Democratic Party.

Born in Dayton, Tennessee, McDonald graduated from Auburn University. McDonald raised soy beans and cotton on his farm in the Huntsville, Alabama area. McDonald served in the Alabama State Senate for the 6th district from 1974 to 1982. He was then elected Alabama Commissioner of Agriculture and Industries serving from 1983 to 1991. His daughter is Caroline McDonald. She is married to Republican Robert Aderholt who serves in the United States House of Representatives representing the 4th District of Alabama.

== Notes ==
Party political offices
Preceded by McMillan Lane	Democratic nominee for Agriculture Commissioner of Alabama; 1982, 1986	Succeeded by A. W. Todd
