= Bobby E. Denton =

American politician

Member of the Alabama Senate from the 1st district

Personal details
- Born: August 13, 1938 (age 88) Cherokee, Alabama
- Party: Democratic
- Spouse: Barbara
- Education: University of Alabama
- Occupation: Previous Director of Development, Northwest Shoals Community College
- Website: Senator Bobby Denton
- As the longest-serving Member, and pursuant to Senate Rule 47(b) of the Alabama Senate, Senator Denton is Dean of the Senate.

Bobby E. Denton is a former Democratic member of the Alabama Senate, who represented the 1st District since 1978, and was the Dean of the Senate, an honorary title. He has a Bachelor of Arts from the University of Alabama and is a previous Director of Development at Northwest Shoals Community College in Muscle Shoals.

Denton retired from the State Senate in 2010.

He is not related to former Alabama U.S. Senator Jeremiah Denton, a Republican.

== Background ==
Denton was born during the Great Depression to sharecroppers and had no electricity as a child. He was first elected in 1976 to the Colbert County Commission and then won the first of his nine Senate elections in 1978.

== Career ==
He served in the Alabama Senate for 32 years, winning nine Senate elections. In 2002 he became Dean of the Senate, an honorary title given to the most senior member of the Senate. According to Senate historian Jon Morgan, Denton served longer continuously than any other senator in Alabama history.

== The Singing Senator ==
Senator Denton is also known as "The Singing Senator". In 1956 Tune Records, a small recording company in Florence, Alabama, recorded Senator Denton as a teenager singing "A Fallen Star". Later Senator Denton joined promoter Judd Phillips, brother of Sam Phillips. Sam was the founder of Sun Records and discovered Elvis Presley. Senator Denton recorded four songs for Judd and later appeared on the Dick Clark Show. While on the Dick Clark Show on September 6, 1958, he sang "Back to School."

In 1997 Senator Denton returned to his musical roots and began recording again. He has recorded several albums and performs for live audiences.

== Family ==
Denton got married while still a teenager to his wife, Barbara. They had three children. He had a son, Mike, who died from a staph infection after knee surgery at the age of 42. As of now, he resides in Tuscumbia, Alabama.
