= List of special elections to the Alabama Senate =

This is a list of special elections to the Alabama Senate. Such elections are called by the governor of Alabama to fill vacancies that occur when a member of the Alabama Senate dies or resigns before the next general election. Winners of these elections serve the remainder of the term and are often candidates in the next election for their districts. General elections are held during the midterms.

For much of the first half of the 20th century, a "gentleman's agreement" compelled state senators to not seek re-election to allow counties from a different county to serve, meaning no county in a multi-county district would be represented two legislatures in a row. During special elections, new senators elected were generally from the same county as the outgoing senator. This practice began to die out in the 1960s. Only three districts kept the agreement by 1971 as reapportionment caused rural districts to take on more counties, making the rotation infeasible.

Special elections to the Alabama Senate have occurred as early as 1820, when Nicholas David was elected to fill the vacancy in the Limestone senatorial district caused by the resignation of Thomas Bibb upon his succession to the governorship.

== 2023–2026 Legislature ==
The following races took place after the 2022 general election:

| District | County(ies) | Contest | Incumbent | Winner | Result | Cause |
|---|---|---|---|---|---|---|
| 5th | Fayette; Jefferson (p); Lamar; Tuscaloosa (p); Walker | Jun. 24, 2025 | Greg Reed (R) | Matt Woods (R) | Rep hold. | Incumbent senator resigned January 1, 2025 to serve as an advisor for Governor Kay Ivey's administration. |
| 9th | Blount (p); Marshall; Madison (p) | ~~Apr. 23, 2024~~; Jan. 9, 2024 | Clay Scofield (R) | Wes Kitchens (R) | Rep hold. | Incumbent senator resigned October 30, 2023 to join the private sector. General election cancelled after the Republican primary, as no other candidates remained. |

== 2019–2022 Legislature ==
The following races took place after the 2018 general election:

| District | County(ies) | Contest | Incumbent | Winner | Result | Cause |
|---|---|---|---|---|---|---|
| 14th | Bibb; Chilton (p); Shelby (p) | Jul. 13, 2021 | Cam Ward (R) | April Weaver (R) | Rep hold. | Incumbent senator resigned December 7, 2020 after being appointed to the state Bureau of Pardons and Paroles. |
| 26th | Montgomery (p) | Mar. 2, 2021 | David Burkette (D) | Kirk Hatcher (D) | Dem hold. | Incumbent senator resigned September 1, 2020 after a campaign finance violation conviction. |

== 2015–2018 Legislature ==
The following race took place after the 2014 general election:

| District | County(ies) | Contest | Incumbent | Winner | Result | Cause |
|---|---|---|---|---|---|---|
| 26th | Montgomery (p) | May 15, 2018 | Quinton Ross (D) | David Burkette (D) | Dem hold. | Incumbent senator resigned October 2, 2017 to become president of the Alabama State University. |

== 2011–2014 Legislature ==
The following race took place after the 2010 general election:

| District | County(ies) | Contest | Incumbent | Winner | Result | Cause |
|---|---|---|---|---|---|---|
| 35th | Mobile (p) | ~~Jan. 28, 2014~~; Dec. 10, 2013 | Ben Brooks (R) | Bill Hightower (R) | Rep hold. | Incumbent senator resigned December 4, 2012 after being elected a circuit judge of Mobile County. General election cancelled after the Republican runoff, as no other candidates remained. |

== 2007–2010 Legislature ==
The following races took place after the 2006 general election:

| District | County(ies) | Contest | Incumbent | Winner | Result | Cause |
|---|---|---|---|---|---|---|
| 19th | Jefferson (p) | ~~Aug. 18, 2009~~; Jun. 30, 2009 | Edward McClain (D) | Priscilla Dunn (D) | Dem hold. | Seat vacated on January 21, 2009 after a felony conviction. General election cancelled after the Democratic runoff, as no other candidates remained. |
| 7th | Madison (p) | Jun. 7, 2009 | Parker Griffith (D) | Paul Sanford (R) | Rep GAIN. | Incumbent senator resigned January 3, 2009, after being elected to the United States House of Representatives. |
| 22nd | Baldwin (p); Choctaw (p); Clarke (p); Conecuh (p); Escambia; Mobile (p); Monroe (p); Washington | Jun. 2, 2009 | Pat Lindsey (D) | Marc Keahey (D) | Dem hold. | Incumbent senator died January 11, 2009. |
| 32nd | Baldwin (p) | Oct. 16, 2007 | Bradley Byrne (R) | Trip Pittman (R) | Rep hold. | Incumbent senator resigned May 24, 2007 to become chancellor of the Alabama Community College System. |

== 2003–2006 Legislature ==
The following race took place after the 2002 general election:

| District | County(ies) | Contest | Incumbent | Winner | Result | Cause |
|---|---|---|---|---|---|---|
| 24th | Bibb (p); Choctaw (p); Greene; Hale (p); Marengo (p); Perry (p); Sumter; Tuscaloosa (p) | Jan. 25, 2005 | Charles Steele Jr. (D) | Bobby Singleton (D) | Dem hold. | Incumbent senator resigned August 10, 2004 after being elected vice president of the Southern Christian Leadership Conference. |

== 1975–1978 Legislature ==
The following races took place after the 1974 general election:

| District | County(ies) | Contest | Incumbent | Winner | Result | Cause |
|---|---|---|---|---|---|---|
| 18th | Coosa; Chilton; Jefferson (p); Shelby (p); Talladega (p) | Aug. 16, 1977 | Obie Littleton (D) | Lister Hill Proctor (D) | Dem hold. | Incumbent senator resigned in March 1977 after being convicted of fraud. |
| 22nd | Barbour (p); Chambers (p); Lee (p); Russell | Feb. 22, 1977 | C. C. Torbert Jr. (D) | G. J. Higginbotham (D) | Dem hold. | Incumbent senator resigned in November 1976 after being elected to the Alabama Supreme Court. |
| 1st | Colbert (p); Franklin (p); Lauderdale | Feb. 1, 1977 | Ronnie Flippo (D) | Oscar Peden (I) | Ind GAIN. | Incumbent senator resigned in November 1976 after being elected to the United States House of Representatives. |
| 25th | Coffee (p); Covington; Geneva; Houston (p) | Nvo. 2, 1976 | Crum Foshee (D) | Wallace Miller (D) | Dem hold. | Seat vacated after a mail fraud conviction. After the conviction was overturned, the Senate reinstated Foshee on March 21, 1978. |
| 29th | Autauga (p); Dallas (p); Greene (p); Hale (p); Marengo; Perry; Sumter (p) | Aug. 31, 1976 | Walter C. Givhan (D) | Earl Goodwin (D) | Dem hold. | Incumbent senator died February 18, 1976. |
| 19th | Calhoun (p); St. Clair; Talladega (p) | Aug. 31, 1976 | Bobby Weaver (D) | John Teague (D) | Dem hold. | Incumbent senator resigned in January 1976 after pleading guilty to embezzlement charges. |

== 1959–1962 Legislature ==
The following races took place after the 1958 general election:

| District | County(ies) | Contest | Incumbent | Winner | Result | Cause |
|---|---|---|---|---|---|---|
| 4th | Madison | Jul. 22, 1962 | James Record (D) | Billy Laxson (D) | Dem hold. | Incumbent senator resigned in March 1962 after being appointed to the Madison County Board of Commissioners. |
| 4th | Madison | ~~Jan. 2, 1962~~ | Dave Archer (D) | James Record (D) | Dem hold. | Incumbent senator resigned after being appointed circuit judge of Madison County. Special election cancelled after only one candidate filed. |
| 10th | Elmore; Tallapoosa | ~~May 12, 1959~~ | Carvel Woodall (D) | Upshaw Jones (D) | Dem hold. | Incumbent senator died February 19, 1959. Special election cancelled after only one candidate filed. |

== 1955–1958 Legislature ==
The following race took place after the 1954 general election:

| District | County(ies) | Contest | Incumbent | Winner | Result | Cause |
|---|---|---|---|---|---|---|
| 32nd | Greene; Hale | ~~Apr. 30, 1957~~ | James S. Coleman (D) | David Hall (D) | Dem hold. | Incumbent senator resigned in January 1957 after being elected to the Alabama Supreme Court. Special election cancelled after only one candidate filed. |

== 1951–1954 Legislature ==
The following races took place after the 1950 general election:

| District | County(ies) | Contest | Incumbent | Winner | Result | Cause |
|---|---|---|---|---|---|---|
| 3rd | Blount; Cullman; Winston | Nov. 4, 1952 | Ben Fant (D) | Bill E. James (D) | Dem hold. | Incumbent senator died in July 1952 of a heart attack. |
| 17th | Butler; Conecuh; Covington | Nov. 4, 1952 | T. Werth Thagard (D) | Arthur E. Gamble Jr. (D) | Dem hold. | Incumbent senator resigned in September 1952 after being appointed a circuit judge. General election candidate was unopposed. |

== 1947–1950 Legislature ==
The following races took place after the 1946 general election:

| District | County(ies) | Contest | Incumbent | Winner | Result | Cause |
|---|---|---|---|---|---|---|
| 5th | Jackson; Marshall | Aug. 8, 1950 | C. J. Owens (D) | Chalmers Weathers (D) | Dem hold. | Incumbent senator died in December 1949. |
| 33rd | Mobile | Aug. 8, 1950 | Joseph N. Langan (D) | Thomas A. Johnston III (D) | Dem hold. | Incumbent senator resigned in May 1950 among speculation that Governor Jim Folsom would call an extraordinary session of the Alabama Legislature for the purposes of reapportionment. |

== 1943–1946 Legislature ==
The following races took place after the 1942 general election:

| District | County(ies) | Contest | Incumbent | Winner | Result | Cause |
|---|---|---|---|---|---|---|
| 8th | Talladega | May 11, 1943 | Kenneth A. Roberts (D) | Richard B. Kelly Jr. (D) | Dem hold. | Incumbent senator resigned in March 1943 upon his enlistment in the Navy. |
| 30th | Dallas | Mar. 23, 1943 | Edgar Poe Russell (D) | John L. Sherrer (D) | Dem hold. | Incumbent senator resigned in January 1943 upon his appointment to the Alabama Department of Corrections. |
| 28th | Montgomery | Jan. 26, 1943 | Charles A. Stakely (D) | Silas D. Cater (D) | Dem hold. | Incumbent senator resigned in December 1942 upon his enlistment in the Navy. |

== 1939–1942 Legislature ==
The following races took place after the 1938 general election:

| District | County(ies) | Contest | Incumbent | Winner | Result | Cause |
|---|---|---|---|---|---|---|
| 14th | Pickens; Sumter | Mar. 26, 1940 | Verdo Elmore (D) | R. B. Doughty (D) | Dem hold. | Incumbent senator resigned after being appointed judge of the 24th Judicial Circuit. |
| 23rd | Dale; Geneva | Sep. 5, 1939 | Tim Faulk (D) | Clyde M. Segrest (D) | Dem hold. | Incumbent senator died in July 1939. |

== 1935–1938 Legislature ==
The following races took place after the 1934 general election:

| District | County(ies) | Contest | Incumbent | Winner | Result | Cause |
|---|---|---|---|---|---|---|
| 4th | Madison | Nov. 3, 1936 | Shelby S. Fletcher (D) | Schuyler H. Richardson (D) | Dem hold. | Incumbent senator died July 1, 1936. |
| 14th | Pickens; Sumter | Nov. 3, 1936 | John A. Rogers (D) | Marcus E. McConnell (D) | Dem hold. | Incumbent senator died September 22, 1936. |
| 25th | Coffee; Crenshaw; Pike | Sep. 11, 1935 | Thomas J. Thrower (D) | W. H. Stoddard (D) | Dem hold. | Incumbent senator died July 12, 1935. |
