= 1974 Alabama Supreme Court election =

- November 5, 1974

The 1974 Alabama Supreme Court election was held on November 5, 1974 to elect three associate justices to the Alabama Supreme Court.

== Place 1 ==
1974 Alabama Supreme Court election, Place 1
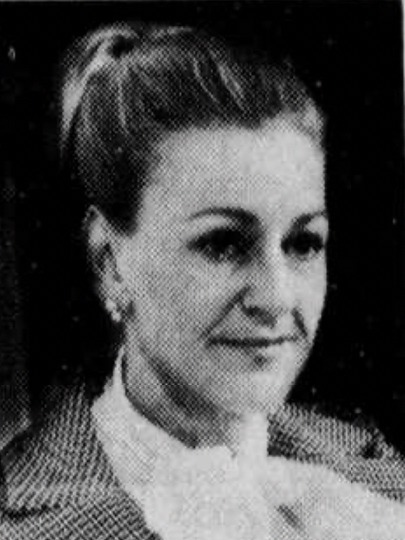
Candidate	Janie Shores
Party	Democratic
Popular vote	458,254
Percentage	100.0%

=== Democratic primary ===
==== Candidates ====
===== Nominee =====
- Janie Shores, law professor and candidate for Supreme Court in 1972

===== Eliminated in primary =====
- Riley Green, incumbent circuit judge of the 12th Judicial Circuit

===== Endorsements =====
Janie Shores

Organizations

- The Anniston Star

==== Results ====
Democratic primary
Party	Candidate	Votes	%
Democratic	Janie Shores	399,136	65.52
Democratic	Riley Green	210,050	34.48
Total votes		609,186	100.00

=== General election ===
==== Results ====
1974 Alabama Supreme Court associate justice election, Place 1
Party	Candidate	Votes	%
Democratic	Janie Shores	458,254	100.00
Total votes		458,254	100.00

== Place 2 ==
1974 Alabama Supreme Court election, Place 2
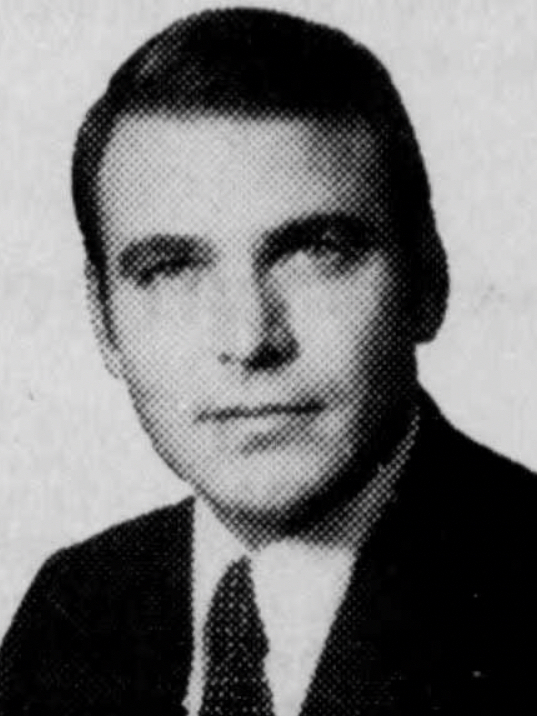
Candidate	R.P. Almon
Party	Democratic
Popular vote	437,590
Percentage	100.0%

=== Democratic primary ===
==== Candidates ====
===== Nominee =====
- R.P. Almon, incumbent Court of Criminal Appeals Justice

===== Eliminated in primary =====
- James W. Aird

==== Results ====
Democratic primary
Party	Candidate	Votes	%
Democratic	R.P. Almon	372,081	65.52
Democratic	James W. Aird	158,462	34.48
Total votes		530,543	100.00

=== General election ===
==== Results ====
1974 Alabama Supreme Court associate justice election, Place 2
Party	Candidate	Votes	%
Democratic	R.P. Almon	437,590	100.00
Total votes		437,590	100.00

== Place 3 ==
1974 Alabama Supreme Court election, Place 3
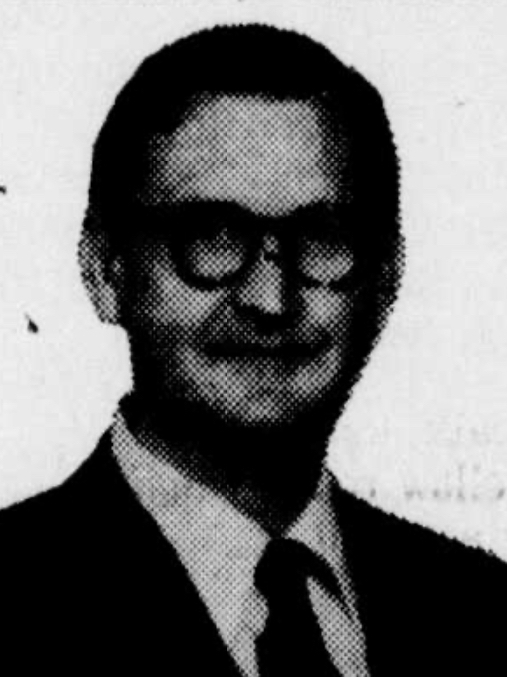
Candidate	Eric Embry
Party	Democratic
Popular vote	436,578
Percentage	100.0%

=== Democratic primary ===
==== Candidates ====
===== Nominee =====
- Eric Embry, lawyer

===== Eliminated in primary =====
- William H. Morrow Jr., general counsel of the Alabama Bar Association

==== Results ====
Democratic primary
Party	Candidate	Votes	%
Democratic	Eric Embry	367,212	57.92
Democratic	William H. Morrow Jr.	266,776	42.08
Total votes		633,988	100.00

=== General election ===
==== Results ====
1974 Alabama Supreme Court associate justice election, Place 3
Party	Candidate	Votes	%
Democratic	Eric Embry	436,578	100.00
Total votes		436,578	100.00
