= 1974 Alabama Senate election =

- November 5, 1974

All 35 seats in the Alabama State Senate 18 seats needed for a majority
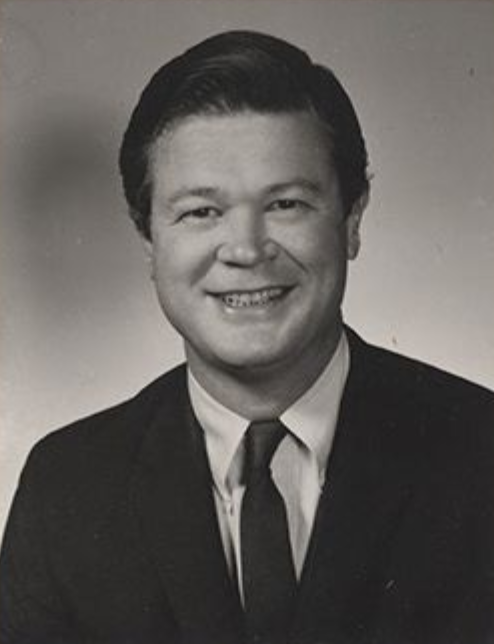

	Majority party	Minority party
Leader	Pierre Pelham (retired)	—
Party	Democratic	National Democratic
Leader since	January 12, 1971	—
Leader's seat	24 p.2–Mobile (seat abolished)	—
Last election	35 seats, 76.4%	0 seats, 16.7%
Seats won	35	0
Popular vote	444,377	14,506
Percentage	92.75%	3.03%
- District results Democratic: 50–60% 60–70% 70–80% 80–90% 90–100% Unopposed
President pro tempore before election
Pierre Pelham
Democratic
Elected President pro tempore
Joe Fine
Democratic

The 1974 Alabama Senate election took place on Tuesday, November 5, 1974, to elect 35 representatives to serve four-year terms in the Alabama Senate. The result was an electoral shutout, as all 35 candidates elected were members of the Democratic Party. This election was notable for seeing the first two Black Americans elected to the chamber since the Reconstruction era, those being U. W. Clemon and J. Richmond Pearson.

Primaries were held on May 7 with runoffs on June 4. This was the first state senate election in Alabama since a 1973 federal court order mandated a new legislative map with single-member districts. Previously, the state used a mixed system of single-member and multi-member districts to allocate seats in the legislature, all based on pre-existing county lines.

== Summary ==
Party	Candidates			Seats		
Party	Num.	Vote	%	Before	Won	+/–
Democratic	35	444,377	92.75%	35	35	Steady
NDPA	5	14,506	3.03%	0	0	Steady
Republican	3	11,775	2.46%	0	0	Steady
Independents	2	5,233	1.09%	0	0	Steady
Conservative	2	3,188	0.67%	0	0	Steady
Others		20	0.00%	0	0	Steady
Total	47	479,099	100%	35		Steady

== Incumbents ==
=== Re-elected ===
- Dick Owen of Baldwin County ran in the 32nd district and won.
- Obie Littleton of Chilton County ran in the 18th district and won.
- Crum Foshee of Covington County ran in the 25th district and won.
- Walter C. Givhan of Dallas County ran in the 29th district and won.
- Joe Fine of Franklin County ran in the 2nd district and won.
- Eddie Hubert Gilmore of Jefferson County ran in the 17th district and won.
- Bill King of Jefferson County ran in the 7th district and won.
- Pat Vacca of Jefferson County ran in the 12th district and won.
- L. W. Noonan of Mobile County ran in the 34th district and won.
- Richard Shelby of Tuscaloosa County ran in the 16th district and won.
- Bobby Weaver of Talladega County ran in the 19th district and won.
- Robert Wilson of Walker County ran in the 5th district and won.

=== Defeated in Democratic primary ===
- Fred Ray Lybrand of Calhoun County ran in the 20th district and lost in the first round.
- George Lewis Bailes of Jefferson County ran in the 11th district and lost in the first round.
- Doug Cook of Jefferson County ran in the 17th district and lost in the runoff.
- Tom Jones of Montgomery County ran in the 27th district and lost in the first round.
- L. L. Dozier of Pike County ran in the 23rd district and lost in the runoff.
- Robert Wilder of Tallapoosa County ran in the 21st district and lost in the first round.

=== Did not seek re-election ===
- James S. Clark of Barbour County did not seek re-election.
- Don Horne of Chambers County did not seek re-election.
- Pat Lindsey of Choctaw County did not seek re-election.
- Kenneth Hammond of DeKalb County did not seek re-election.
- Richard Malone of Etowah County did not seek re-election.
- James A. Branyon of Fayette County did not seek re-election.
- Larry Register of Houston County did not seek re-election.
- Richard Dominick of Jefferson County did not seek re-election.
- John Hawkins of Jefferson County did not seek re-election.
- Stewart O'Bannon of Lauderdale County did not seek re-election.
- Gene McLain of Madison County did not seek re-election.
- Aubrey J. Carr of Marshall County did not seek re-election.
- Bob Edington of Mobile County did not seek re-election.
- President pro tempore Pierre Pelham of Mobile County did not seek re-election.
- J. J. Pierce of Montgomery County did not seek re-election.
- Bob Harris of Morgan County did not seek re-election.
- Roland Cooper of Wilcox County did not seek re-election.

== General election results ==
District	Democratic			National Democratic			Others			Total		
District	Candidate	Votes	%	Candidate	Votes	%	Candidate	Votes	%	Votes	Maj.	Mrg.
5th	Robert Wilson (inc.)	12,548	80.59%	—	—	—	Larry Akins (Rep.)	3,023	19.41%	15,571	+9,525	+61.17%
7th	Bill King	14,771	92.59%	Ernestine Langford	1,182	7.41%	—	—	—	15,953	+13,589	+85.18%
13th	J. Richmond Pearson	11,937	84.29%	—	—	—	Herbert Stone (Con.)	2,224	15.71%	14,161	+9,713	+68.59%
20th	Donald Stewart	13,183	74.95%	—	—	—	Margaret E. Stout (Rep.)	4,405	25.05%	17,588	+8,778	+49.91%
23rd	T. Dudley Perry	12,529	66.04%	Robert Harris	2,097	11.05%	Rudolph Shelley (Rep.)	4,347	22.91%	18,973	+8,182	+43.12%
26th	Jerry Powell	9,075	55.84%	Oscar Cook	1,945	11.97%	2 others (Note: William Hobbie (Ind.): 3,898, 23.98%; J.D. Hogan (Ind.): 1,335, 8.21%)	5,233	32.19%	16,253	+5,177	+31.85%
29th	Walter C. Givhan (inc.)	15,070	69.90%	Amelia Boynton Robinson	6,483	30.07%	Haywood F. Stokes (write-in)	7	0.03%	21,560	+8,587	+39.83%
30th	Bert Bank	16,481	85.48%	Martin Goodson	2,799	14.52%	—	—	—	19,280	+13,682	+70.96%
35th	Bill Roberts	13,183	93.19%	—	—	—	Charles McDade (Con.)	964	6.81%	14,147	+12,219	+86.37%
Source: 1975 Alabama Official and Statistical Register (294–296)

=== Elected unopposed ===
The following Democratic nominees did not face opposition in the general election:

- District 1: Ronnie Flippo received 7,578 votes.
- District 2: Joe Fine (inc.) received 12,729 votes.
- District 3: Bingham Edwards received 9,865 votes.
- District 4: Finis St. John received 16,700 votes.
- District 6: Albert McDonald received 11,275 votes.
- District 8: John Baker (inc.) received 13,104 votes.
- District 9: Sid McDonald received 12,112 votes.
- District 10: Gerald Waldrop received 13,071 votes.
- District 11: George McMillan received 14,935 votes. 1 other vote was recorded.
- District 12: Paul Vacca (inc.) received 15,350 votes.
- District 14: Bob Ellis received 14,249 votes.
- District 15: U. W. Clemon received 9,022 votes. 9 other votes were recorded.
- District 16: Richard Shelby (inc.) received 10,626 votes.
- District 17: Eddie Hubert Gilmore (inc.) received 16,829 votes.
- District 18: Obie Littleton (inc.) received 14,707 votes.
- District 19: Robert Weaver (inc.) received 11,274 votes. 1 other vote was recorded.
- District 21: Ted Little received 10,489 votes.
- District 22: C. C. Torbert received 8,436 votes.
- District 24: Sam Adams received 8,475 votes.
- District 25: Crum Foshee (inc.) received 12,802 votes.
- District 27: Fred Jones received 14,899 votes.
- District 28: Wendell Mitchell received 14,471 votes.
- District 31: Maston Mims received 13,238 votes.
- District 32: Dick Owen (inc.) received 15,448 votes.
- District 33: Mike Perloff received 7,125 votes.
- District 34: L. W. Noonan (inc.) received 16,791 votes.

== Democratic primary results ==
=== Runoff results by district ===
Candidates in boldface advanced to the general election. An asterisk (*) denotes a runoff winner who was the runner-up in the first round. Senator Bobby Weaver initially faced a runoff in District 19 against Frank Finch, but Finch withdrew from the race, allowing Weaver to advance to the general election, where he went unopposed.

District	Winner			Loser			Total		
District	Candidate	Votes	%	Candidate	Votes	%	Votes	Maj.	Mrg.
3rd	**Bingham Edwards***	13,547	60.62%	Joe Calvin	8,801	39.38%	22,348	+4,746	+21.24%
6th	**Albert McDonald**	7,157	53.41%	Granville Turner	6,244	46.59%	13,401	+913	+6.81%
13th	**J. Richmond Pearson**	8,456	61.27%	Thomas L. Alexander	5,346	38.73%	13,802	+3,110	+22.53%
14th	**Robert Ellis**	7,893	55.90%	Johnny Nichols	6,227	44.10%	14,120	+1,666	+11.80%
17th	**Eddie Hubert Gilmore**	9,902	51.26%	Doug Cook	9,417	48.74%	19,319	+485	+2.51%
23rd	**Dudley Perry**	14,544	56.41%	L. L. Dozier	11,238	43.59%	25,782	+3,306	+12.82%
31st	**Maston Mims***	11,589	51.65%	W. E. Garrett	10,850	48.35%	22,439	+739	+3.29%
32nd	**Dick Owen**	11,356	51.85%	Robert Gulledge	10,547	48.15%	21,903	+809	+3.69%
33rd	**Mike Perloff**	6,331	51.60%	James E. Buskey	5,938	48.40%	12,269	+393	+3.20%
35th	**Bill Roberts**	9,792	58.65%	Casey Downing	6,903	41.35%	16,695	+2,889	+17.30%
Source: The Birmingham News

=== First round results by district ===
Candidates in boldface advanced to either the general election or a runoff, first-place winners with an asterisk (*) did not face a runoff.

District	First place			Runners-up			Others			Total		
District	Candidate	Votes	%	Candidate	Votes	%	Candidate	Votes	%	Votes	Maj.	Mrg.
3rd	**Joe Calvin**	6,907	32.16%	**Bingham Edwards**	**6,701**	**31.21%**	2 others (Note: Don Tomlinson: 4,918, 22.90%; Dewayne Cameron: 2,948, 13.73%)	7,866	36.63%	21,474	+206	+0.96%
5th	**Robert Wilson***	11,144	59.77%	Doug Adams	7,500	40.23%	—	—	—	18,644	+3,644	+19.55%
6th	**Albert McDonald**	6,137	37.63%	**Granville Turner**	**5,522**	**33.86%**	Charles Sullins	4,648	28.50%	16,307	+615	+3.77%
7th	**Bill King***	9,823	56.33%	Charles Grainger	7,614	43.67%	—	—	—	17,437	+2,209	+12.67%
8th	**John Baker***	11,348	64.53%	W. R. Inman	6,237	35.47%	—	—	—	17,585	+5,111	+29.06%
9th	**Sid McDonald**	10,180	47.62%	**Woodie Shelton**	**3,174**	**14.85%**	3 others (Note: B. B. Sanford: 3,059, 14.31%; B. E. McPherson: 2,589, 12.11%; Roger Southerland: 2,376 11.11%)	8,024	37.53%	21,378	+7,006	+32.77%
10th	**Gerald Waldrop***	12,830	50.21%	Les Gilliland	8,105	31.72%	Robert Lewis	4,620	18.08%	25,555	+4,725	+18.49%
11th	**George McMillan***	9,992	50.58%	George Lewis Bailes	9,764	49.42%	—	—	—	19,756	+228	+1.15%
12th	**Pat Vacca***	10,824	62.12%	James K. Watley	6,601	37.88%	—	—	—	17,425	+4,223	+24.24%
13th	**J. Richmond Pearson**	5,458	34.04%	**Thomas L. Alexander**	**3,756**	**23.43%**	4 others (Note: Dick Shamburger: 2,213, 13.80%; Paul Thomason: 2,028, 12.65%; Al Thomas: 1,698, 10.59%; Hiram Crawford: 880, 5.49%)	6,819	42.53%	16,033	+1,702	+10.62%
14th	**Robert Ellis**	7,967	44.39%	**Johnny Nichols**	**5,209**	**29.02%**	E. C. Reese	4,771	26.58%	17,947	+2,758	+15.37%
17th	**Eddie Hubert Gilmore**	9,127	42.48%	**Doug Cook**	**6,840**	**31.84%**	Tom Stubbs	5,516	25.68%	21,483	+2,287	+10.65%
18th	**Obie Littleton***	11,640	54.60%	Lister Hill Proctor	9,679	45.40%	—	—	—	21,319	+1,961	+9.20%
19th	**Bobby Weaver**	8,285	49.21%	**Frank Finch**	**4,492**	**26.68%**	Allen Hudson	4,060	24.11%	16,837	+3,793	+22.53%
20th	**Donald Stewart***	15,076	67.28%	Fred Ray Lybrand	7,333	32.72%	—	—	—	22,409	+7,743	+34.55%
21st	**T. D. Little***	12,340	55.36%	Robert Wilder	9,952	44.64%	—	—	—	22,292	+2,388	+10.71%
22nd	**C. C. Torbert Jr.***	10,947	64.82%	Charles Adams	5,942	35.18%	—	—	—	16,889	+5,005	+29.63%
23rd	**Dudley Perry**	10,507	44.87%	**L. L. Dozier**	**9,880**	**42.19%**	K. H. Walker	3,029	12.94%	23,416	+627	+2.68%
24th	**Sam Adams***	12,496	78.71%	Mack Rudd	3,380	21.29%	—	—	—	15,876	+9,116	+57.42%
25th	**Crum Foshee**	13,374	53.45%	Harold Wise	11,649	**46.55%**	—	—	—	25,023	+1,725	+6.89%
26th	**Jerry Powell***	9,768	65.47%	Oscar David Cook	5,152	34.53%	—	—	—	14,920	+4,616	+30.94%
27th	**Fred Jones***	10,555	51.64%	Tom Jones	9,885	48.36%	—	—	—	20,440	+670	+3.28%
28th	**Wendell Mitchell***	16,301	73.67%	Robert Austin	5,825	26.33%	—	—	—	22,126	+10,476	+47.35%
29th	**Walter C. Givhan***	16,988	57.83%	J. L. Chestnut	12,390	42.17%	—	—	—	29,378	+4,598	+15.65%
30th	**Bert Bank***	15,511	67.01%	William Lang	7,638	32.99%	—	—	—	23,149	+7,873	+34.01%
31st	**W. E. Garrett**	8,640	36.65%	**Maston Mims**	**7,460**	**31.65%**	2 others (Note: Ernest Jackson: 5,623, 23.85%; Henry Welch: 1,850, 7.85%)	7,473	31.70%	23,573	+1,180	+5.01%
32nd	**Dick Owen**	9,900	45.07%	**Robert Gulledge**	**7,703**	**35.07%**	Percy Beech	4,363	19.86%	21,966	+2,197	+10.00%
33rd	**Mike Perloff**	4,255	32.98%	**James E. Buskey**	**3,560**	**27.59%**	2 others (Note: Henry Rembert: 2,629, 20.38%; Arnold L. Black: 2,459, 19.06%)	5,088	39.43%	12,903	+695	+5.39%
35th	**Bill Roberts**	6,690	45.98%	**Casey Downing**	**5,884**	**40.44%**	Nelson Burnett	1,975	13.57%	14,549	+806	+5.54%
Source: The Birmingham News

== See also ==
- 1974 United States Senate election in Alabama
- 1974 Alabama gubernatorial election
- List of Alabama state legislatures
