= 1950 Alabama Senate election =

- November 7, 1950

All 35 seats in the Alabama State Senate 18 seats needed for a majority
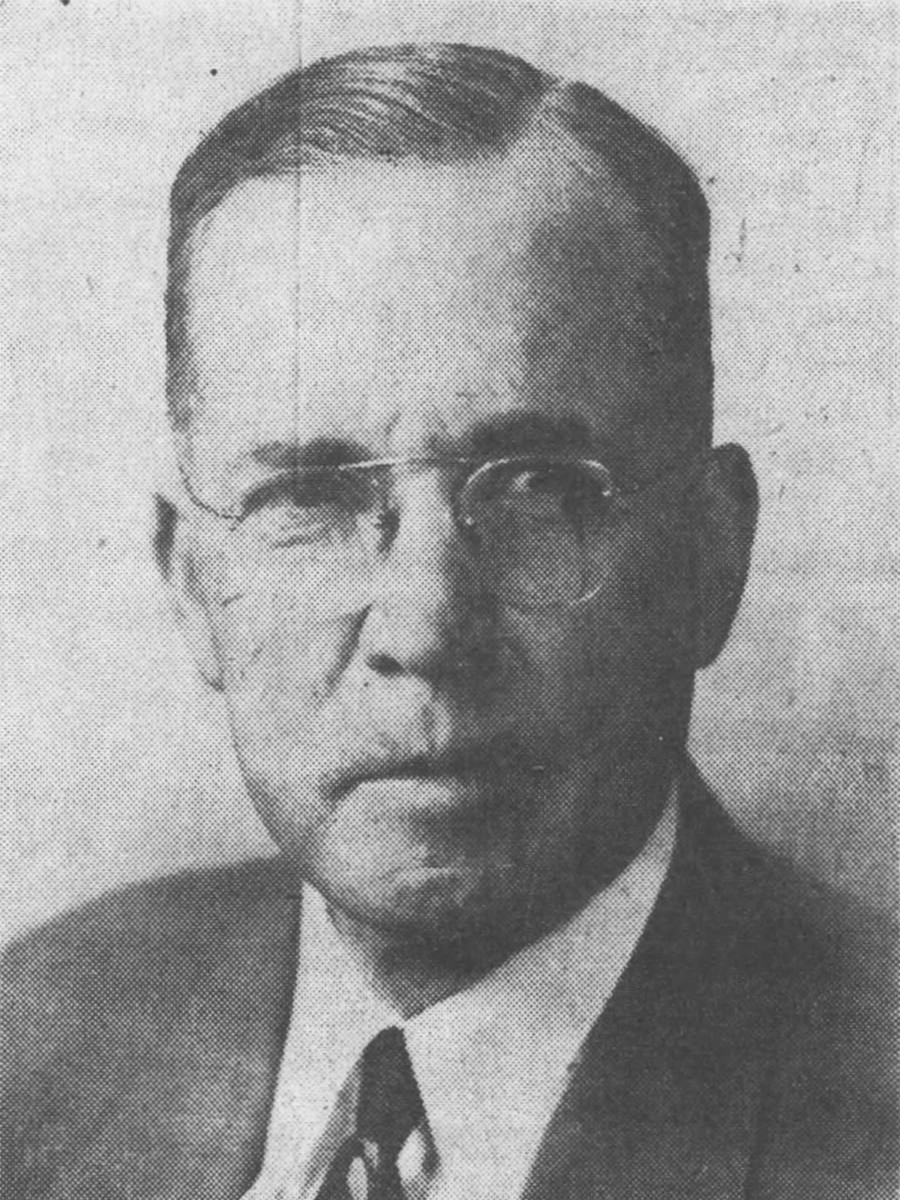

	Majority party	Minority party
Leader	J. Bruce Henderson (did not stand)	—
Party	Democratic	Republican
Leader since	January 14, 1947	—
Leader's seat	22nd–Wilcox Co.	—
Last election	35 seats, 94.87%	0 seats, 5.13%
Seats won	35	0
Popular vote	147,981	3,818
Percentage	97.48%	2.52%
- Winners by vote share Democratic: 60–70% Unopposed
President pro tempore before election
J. Bruce Henderson
Democratic
Elected President pro tempore
Albert Boutwell
Democratic

The 1950 Alabama Senate election took place on Tuesday, November 7, 1950, to elect 35 representatives to serve four-year terms in the Alabama Senate. The election used the same districts first drawn by the Alabama Constitution of 1901.

34 of the 35 Democratic nominees did not face any opposition in the general election. As the Democratic Party was dominant in the state, state legislative seats were generally decided at the Democratic primary election. The first round of the Democratic primary was held on May 2 with runoff elections on May 30. Only one Republican, Hubert E. Mitchell, sought a state senate seat, in District 3.

Senator Albert Boutwell of Jefferson County was chosen to be President pro tempore of the Senate on January 9, 1951, unopposed.

The election took place concurrently with elections for U.S. Senate, U.S. House, governor, state house, and numerous other state and local offices.

== Summary ==
Party	Candidates			Seats		
Party	Num.	Vote	%	Before	Won	+/–
Democratic	35	147,981	97.48%	35	35	Steady
Republican	1	3,818	2.52%	0	0	Steady
Total	36	151,799	100%	35	35	Steady

== Incumbents ==
Nearly every incumbent senator in a multi-county district chose not to seek re-election, as a gentlemen's agreement compelled state senators to give up their seats to allow a candidate from another county to serve.

=== Won re-election ===
- District 8: Graham Wright won re-election.
- District 13: Albert Boutwell won re-election.
- District 16: C. Mac Golson won re-election.
- District 24: Preston C. Clayton won re-election.
- District 30: George P. Quarles won re-election.
- District 33: Thomas A. Johnston III won re-election. Johnston succeeded Joseph N. Langan, who resigned in May 1950 after he had already lost the Democratic primary to Johnston.

=== Eliminated in primary ===
- District 3: C. B. Harvey lost the Democratic nomination to B. R. Fant.
- District 4: Bob Lowe lost the Democratic nomination to Joe S. Foster.
- District 7: Tom Blake Howle lost the Democratic nomination to Elvin McCary.
- District 20: T. B. Perry sought re-election but withdrew from the Democratic primary.

=== Did not seek re-election ===
- District 1: David U. Patton unsuccessfully ran for lieutenant governor.
- District 2: Noble J. Russell was elected to Morgan County's first seat in the state house.
- District 5: Chalmers Weathers did not seek re-election. Weathers succeeded C. J. Owens, who died of a heart attack in December 1949.
- District 6: James Allen was elected lieutenant governor.
- District 9: Paul J. Hooton did not seek re-election.
- District 10: Broughton Lamberth did not seek re-election.
- District 11: Henry H. Mize did not seek re-election.
- District 12: Fuller A. Kimbrell did not seek re-election.
- District 14: W. E. Barrett did not seek re-election, and died of an illness in November 1950.
- District 15: W. A. Gulledge did not seek re-election.
- District 17: Robert G. Kendall was elected to Conecuh County's seat in the state house.
- District 18: W. H. Cooper did not seek re-election.
- District 19: Ben Nash Glover did not seek re-election.
- District 21: George R. Swift did not seek re-election.
- District 22: J. Bruce Henderson unsuccessfully ran for governor.
- District 23: J. A. Hughes did not seek re-election.
- District 25: Vernon S. Summerlin was elected to Crenshaw County's seat in the state house.
- District 26: Forrest G. Bridges did not seek re-election.
- District 27: Albert Patterson unsuccessfully ran for lieutenant governor.
- District 28: Silas D. Cater did not seek re-election.
- District 29: T. F. Burnside did not seek re-election.
- District 31: Rankin Fite was elected to Marion County's seat in the state house.
- District 32: James S. Coleman did not seek re-election.
- District 34: John E. Gaither did not seek re-election.
- District 35: William G. Hardwick ran for lieutenant governor and withdrew after placing second in the first round of the Democratic primary.

== General election results ==
=== District 3 (Blount–Cullman–Winston) ===
District 3 election
Party	Candidate	Votes	%
Democratic	B. R. Fant	6,918	64.44%
Republican	Hubert E. Mitchell	3,818	35.56%
Total votes		10,736	100.00%

=== Elected without opposition ===
Every candidate elected with no opponents was a Democrat.

- District 1: W. Amos Jones received 4,227 votes.
- District 2: J. B. Richardson received 3,640 votes.
- District 4: Joe Foster received 2,096 votes.
- District 5: John B. Benson received 3,550 votes.
- District 6: Sam High received 6,049 votes.
- District 7: Elvin McCary received 3,215 votes.
- District 8: Graham Wright received 2,809 votes.
- District 9: Bubber Johnson received 2,624 votes.
- District 10: C. T. Reneau received 3,981 votes.
- District 11: E. W. Skidmore received 3,016 votes.
- District 12: Ross Hollis received 7,331 votes.
- District 13: Albert Boutwell received 30,223 votes.
- District 14: John H. Pinson received 1,539 votes.
- District 15: Tom Phillips received 4,922 votes.
- District 16: C. Mac Golson received 571 votes.
- District 17: T. Werth Thagard received 3,961 votes.
- District 18: Judson C. Locke received 1,716 votes.
- District 19: Robert Locke received 2,744 votes.
- District 20: E. O. Eddins received 1,145 votes.
- District 21: Jimmy Faulkner received 5,179 votes.
- District 22: J. W. Bonner received 781 votes.
- District 23: Mike Sollie III received 2,118 votes.
- District 24: Preston C. Clayton received 923 votes.
- District 25: H. B. Larkins received 3,760 votes.
- District 26: Lawrence K. Andrews received 1,270 votes.
- District 27: John L. Whatley received 2,685 votes.
- District 28: Vaughan Hill Robison received 6,470 votes.
- District 29: Virgil M. Smith received 5,572 votes.
- District 30: George P. Quarles received 1,864 votes.
- District 31: A. W. Todd received 6,777 votes.
- District 32: Herbert B. Byars received 1,447 votes.
- District 33: Thomas A. Johnston III received 8,299 votes.
- District 34: M. J. Norell received 2,223 votes.
- District 35: Carl S. Farmer received 2,336 votes.

== Democratic primary results ==
=== Runoff results by district ===
Candidates in boldface advanced to the general election. An asterisk (*) denotes a runoff winner who trailed in the first round.

District	Winner			Loser			Total		
District	Candidate	Votes	%	Candidate	Votes	%	Votes	Maj.	Mrg.
3rd	**B. R. Fant***	6,150	50.47%	Charlie Rainey	6,035	49.53%	12,185	+115	+0.94%
6th	**Sam High**	7,161	55.25%	Clif Herzberg	5,799	44.75%	12,960	+1,362	+10.51%
7th	**Elvin McCary***	4,749	59.74%	Henry H. Booth	3,201	40.26%	7,950	+1,548	+19.47%
9th	**Bubber Johnston**	6,576	69.05%	Charles A. Spence	2,948	30.95%	9,524	+3,628	+38.09%
23rd	**Mike Sollie III**	2,547	57.02%	Charlie Evans	1,920	42.98%	4,467	+627	+14.04%
28th	**Vaughan Hill Robison**	6,366	51.05%	Charles A. Stakely	6,105	48.95%	12,471	+261	+2.09%
34th	**M. J. Norrell**	4,056	57.53%	A. L. Crumpton	2,994	42.47%	7,050	+1,062	+15.06%
Source: Alabama Official and Statistical Register, 1951 (p. 573–574), The Troy Messenger

Additionally, a runoff between W. B. Mahan and A. W. Todd in District 31 was planned, but was cancelled after Mahan withdrew citing health issues, giving Todd the Democratic nomination.

=== First round results by district ===
Candidates in boldface advanced to either the general election or a runoff, first-place winners with an asterisk (*) did not face a runoff.

District	First place			Runners-up			Others			Total		
District	Candidate	Votes	%	Candidate	Votes	%	Candidate	Votes	%	Votes	Maj.	Mrg.
1st	**W. Amos Jones***	5,819	53.74%	W. R. Cunningham	5,010	46.26%	—	—	—	10,829	+809	+7.47%
2nd	**J. B. Richardson***	6,829	56.07%	Bill Lee Jr.	5,350	43.93%	—	—	—	12,179	+1,479	+12.14%
3rd	**Charlie Rainey**	3,942	30.21%	**B. R. Fant**	**3,612**	**27.68%**	3 others (Note: C. B. Harvey (inc.): 2,605 votes, 19.97%; R. F. Donehou: 1,590 votes, 12.19%; Bart J. Cowart: 1,298 votes, 9.95%)	5,493	42.10%	13,047	+330	+2.53%
4th	**Joe S. Foster***	4,104	54.89%	Bob Lowe (inc.)	3,373	45.11%	—	—	—	7,477	+731	+9.78%
5th	**John B. Benson***	7,504	69.36%	O. E. Harper	3,315	30.64%	—	—	—	10,819	+4,189	+38.72%
6th	**Sam High**	5,519	39.87%	**Cliff Herzberg**	**4,775**	**34.50%**	John W. Inzerm Jr.	3,547	25.63%	13,841	+744	+5.38%
7th	**Henry H. Booth**	2,672	27.47%	**Elvin McCary**	**2,600**	**26.73%**	4 others (Note: Tom Blake Howle (inc.): 2,581 votes, 26.54%; F. A. McCartney: 1,178 votes, 12.11%; M. J. Williams Jr.: 659 votes, 6.78%; O. G. Megginson: 36 votes, 0.37%)	4,454	45.80%	9,726	+72	+0.74%
8th	**Graham Wright (inc.)***	3,925	50.78%	Harry E. Garrett	3,805	49.22%	—	—	—	7,730	+120	+1.55%
9th	**Bubber Johnston**	4,375	49.09%	**Charles H. Spence**	**2,439**	**27.36%**	2 others (Note: Budd Humphrey: 1,159 votes, 13.00%; J. Alex Still: 940 votes, 10.55%)	2,099	23.55%	8,913	+1,936	+21.72%
10th	**C. T. Reneau***	8,089	67.25%	Aubrey Hornsby	3,939	32.75%	—	—	—	12,028	+4,150	+34.50%
11th	**E. W. Skidmore***	4,579	50.54%	Albert R. Maxwell	3,206	35.39%	James E. Casey	1,275	14.07%	9,060	+1,373	+15.15%
12th	**Ross Hollis***	8,513	53.45%	W. W. Waldrop	7,415	46.55%	—	—	—	15,928	+1,098	+6.89%
13th	**Albert Boutwell (inc.)***	43,812	82.13%	James M. Robertson	9,535	17.87%	—	—	—	53,347	+34,277	+64.25%
15th	**J. T. Phillips***	5,216	53.82%	L. W. Wooten	2,298	23.71%	John Foshee	2,177	22.46%	9,691	+2,918	+30.11%
18th	**Judson C. Locke***	2,870	54.58%	W. O. Crawford	2,388	45.42%	—	—	—	5,258	+482	+9.17%
20th	**E. O. Eddins***	1,869	53.10%	J. Wallace Tutt	1,651	46.90%	T. B. Perry (inc.)	Withdrawn		3,520	+218	+6.19%
21st	**J. H. Faulkner***	7,122	54.54%	C. Lenoir Thompson	2,893	22.15%	2 others (Note: Frank F. Earle: 2,548 votes, 19.51%; James A. Carney: 496 votes, 3.80%)	3,044	23.31%	13,059	+4,229	+32.38%
22nd	**J. M. Bonner***	1,205	58.41%	L. Y. Sadler	858	41.59%	—	—	—	2,063	+347	+16.82%
23rd	**Mike Sollie III**	3,494	46.56%	**Charlie Evans**	**2,507**	**33.40%**	George L. Beck	1,504	20.04%	7,505	+987	+13.15%
27th	**John L. Whatley***	4,411	62.21%	John Herbert Orr	2,512	35.43%	Jess Whitford Smith	168	2.37%	7,091	+1,899	+26.78%
28th	**Vaughan Hill Robison**	6,974	47.51%	**Charles A. Stakely**	**5,928**	**40.38%**	Albert Roemer	1,778	12.11%	14,680	+1,046	+7.13%
29th	**Virgil M. Smith***	4,813	51.03%	J. Monroe Mitchell	4,619	48.97%	—	—	—	9,432	+194	+2.06%
31st	**A. W. Todd**	7,582	46.14%	**W. B. Mahan**	**5,061**	**30.80%**	Shelton C. Pinion	3,789	23.06%	16,432	+2,521	+15.34%
33rd	**Thomas Johnston III***	12,721	60.79%	Joseph N. Langan (inc.)	8,206	39.21%	—	—	—	20,927	+4,515	+21.57%
34th	**M. J. Norell**	2,994	40.57%	**A. L. Crumpton**	**2,294**	**31.08%**	E. E. Nelson	2,092	28.35%	7,380	+700	+9.49%
35th	**Carl S. Farmer***	4,467	55.94%	M. W. Espy	3,519	44.06%	—	—	—	7,986	+948	+11.87%
Source: Alabama Official and Statistical Register, 1951 (p. 561–565)

=== Nominated without opposition ===
The following candidates automatically won the Democratic nomination, as no opponent filed to run against them:

- District 14: John H. Pinson
- District 16: C. Mac Golson (inc.)
- District 17: T. Werth Thagard
- District 19: Robert Locke
- District 24: Preston C. Clayton (inc.)
- District 25: H. B. Larkins
- District 26: Lawrence K. Andrews
- District 30: George P. Quarles (inc.)
- District 32: Herbert B. Byars

== 1947–1950 special elections ==
=== District 5 (Jackson–Marshall) ===
A special election in District 5 (Jackson–Marshall) was triggered by the death of C. J. Owens in December 1949. Governor Jim Folsom requested the Marshall County Democratic Executive Committee to choose the Democratic nominee, as Owens was from Marshall County. The committee chose Chalmers L. Weathers over T. C. Satterfield at a meeting in June 1950. John B. Benson, who had won the regular Democratic primary in May, was ineligible for the special election as he was from Jackson County. C. L. Weathers ran in the general election unopposed.

1952 Alabama Senate District 5 special general election August 8, 1950
Party	Candidate	Votes	%	±%
Democratic	Chalmers Weathers	1,934	100.00%	N/A
Total votes		1,934	100.00%	

=== District 33 (Mobile) ===
A special election in District 33 (Mobile County) was triggered by the resignation of Joseph N. Langan in May 1950 among speculation that Governor Jim Folsom would call an extraordinary session of the Alabama Legislature for the purposes of reapportionment. Thomas A. Johnston III, who had already defeated Langan for re-election in the regular Democratic primary in early May, ran in the special election unopposed.

1952 Alabama Senate District 33 special general election August 8, 1950
Party	Candidate	Votes	%	±%
Democratic	Thomas A. Johnston III	738	100.00%	N/A
Total votes		738	100.00%	

== Republican candidate ==
Only one Republican, attorney Hubert E. Mitchell, filed to run for the District 3 Senate seat against Democrat B. R. Fant. District 3 contained the counties of Blount, Cullman, and Winston, the latter of which being a Republican stronghold. He was nominated at a convention in Jasper on June 7.

== See also ==
- Category:1950 elections in Alabama
  - 1950 United States Senate election in Alabama
  - 1950 United States House of Representatives elections in Alabama
  - 1950 Alabama gubernatorial election
- 1950 United States elections
