= 1954 Alabama Senate election =

- November 2, 1954

All 35 seats in the Alabama State Senate 18 seats needed for a majority
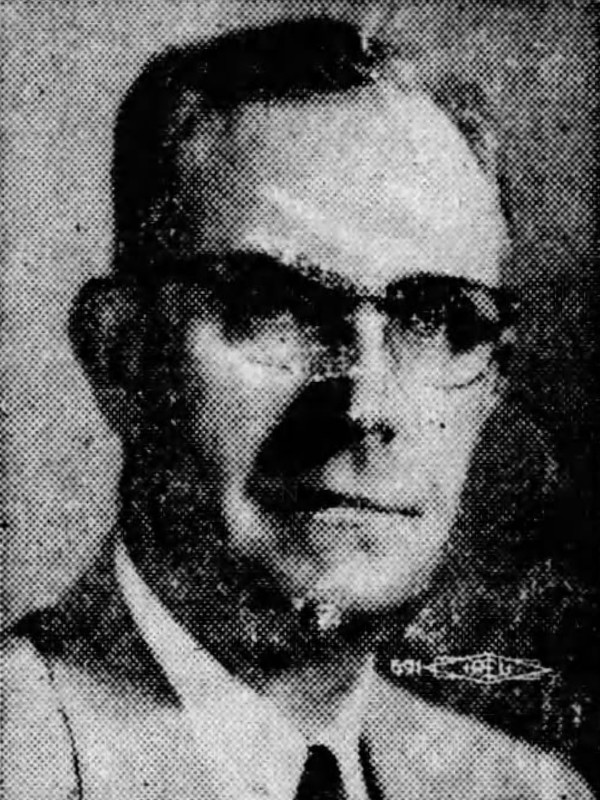
	Majority party
Leader	Albert Boutwell (retired as leader)
Party	Democratic
Leader since	January 9, 1951
Leader's seat	13th–Jefferson Co.
Last election	35 seats, 97.48%
Seats won	35
Popular vote	263,982
Percentage	99.998%
- District results New Democratic senator Democratic incumbent re-elected
President pro tempore before election
Albert Boutwell
Democratic
Elected President pro tempore
Broughton Lamberth
Democratic

The 1954 Alabama Senate election took place on Tuesday, November 2, 1954, to elect 35 representatives to serve four-year terms in the Alabama Senate. The election used the same districts first drawn by the Alabama Constitution of 1901.

None of the 35 Democratic nominees faced significant opposition in the general election. As the Democratic Party was dominant in the state, state legislative seats were generally decided at the Democratic primary election. The Democratic primary election was held on May 4 with runoff elections on June 1. Only one Republican, Warren Wallace Bailey, sought the District 3 senate seat, but withdrew before the general election. A few Republicans sought state house seats.

Newly-elected Senator Broughton Lamberth of Tallapoosa County, with the support of Governor Jim Folsom, was unanimously chosen to be President pro tempore of the Senate on January 11, 1955.

The election took place concurrently with elections for U.S. Senate, U.S. House, governor, state house, and numerous other state and local offices.

== Summary ==
Party	Candidates			Seats		
Party	Num.	Vote	%	Before	Won	+/–
Democratic	35	263,982	99.998%	35	35	Steady
Write-in	1	4	0.002%	—	0	Steady
Total	36	263,986	100%	35	35	Steady

== Incumbents ==
Every incumbent senator in a multi-county district chose not to seek re-election, as a gentlemen's agreement compelled state senators to give up their seats to allow a candidate from another county to serve.

=== Won re-election ===
- District 11: E. W. Skidmore won re-election.
- District 13: Albert Boutwell won re-election.
- District 20: E. O. Eddins won re-election.
- District 28: Vaughan Hill Robison won re-election.

=== Eliminated in primary ===
- District 4: Joe Foster lost re-nomination to T. Herman Vann.
- District 16: C. Mac Golson lost re-nomination to Joe B. Davis.
- District 22: J. M. Bonner lost re-nomination to Roland Cooper.
- District 33: Thomas A. Johnston lost re-nomination to Garet Van Antwerp.

=== Did not seek re-election ===
- District 1: W. Amos Jones unsuccessfully sought the state house seat in Lauderdale County, and died in August 1954.
- District 2: J. B. Richardson did not seek re-election.
- District 3: Bill E. James did not seek re-election. James succeeded the late Sen. Ben Fant in a November 1952 special election after Fant's death from a heart attack.
- District 5: John B. Benson did not seek re-election.
- District 6: Sam High unsuccessfully sought the state house seat in St. Clair County.
- District 7: Elvin McCary did not seek re-election.
- District 8: Graham Wright did not seek re-election.
- District 9: Bubber Johnson did not seek re-election.
- District 10: C. T. Reneau did not seek re-election.
- District 12: Ross Hollis did not seek re-election.
- District 14: John H. Pinson unsuccessfully sought the second state house seat in Sumter County.
- District 15: Tom Phillips did not seek re-election.
- District 17: A. E. Gamble Jr. unsuccessfully sought the first state house seat in Butler County. Gamble succeeded T. Werth Thagard in September 1952, who was appointed to a circuit judgeship.
- District 18: Judson C. Locke won the first state house seat in Perry County.
- District 19: Robert Locke won the state house seat in Choctaw County.
- District 21: Jimmy Faulkner unsuccessfully ran for governor.
- District 23: Mike Sollie III did not seek re-election.
- District 24: Preston C. Clayton was appointed an Alabama Supreme Court justice in October 1953.
- District 25: H. B. Larkins did not seek re-election.
- District 26: Lawrence K. Andrews did not seek re-election.
- District 27: John L. Whatley did not seek re-election.
- District 29: Virgil M. Smith did not seek re-election.
- District 30: George P. Quarles was appointed probate judge of Dallas County in September 1953.
- District 31: A. W. Todd won the Democratic nomination for Franklin County's state house seat, but subsequently ran for Commissioner of Agriculture and won.
- District 32: Herbert B. Byars unsuccessfully sought the state house seat in Hale County.
- District 34: M. J. Norell did not seek re-election.
- District 35: Carl S. Farmer did not seek re-election.

== General election results ==
Every Democratic nominee won without any opposition on the general election ballot.

- District 1: Milton C. Grisham received 8,657 votes.
- District 2: Joe Calvin received 8,087 votes.
- District 3: Harlan G. Allen received 11,039 votes.
- District 4: T. Herman Vann received 5,200 votes.
- District 5: Smith C. Dyar received 8,384 votes.
- District 6: E. L. Roberts received 12,803 votes.
- District 7: A. C. Shelton received 5,870 votes.
- District 8: G. Kyser Leonard received 6,527 votes.
- District 9: George W. Yarbrough received 6,907 votes.
- District 10: Broughton Lamberth received 9,497 votes.
- District 11: E. W. Skidmore (inc.) received 6,075 votes.
- District 12: Reuben L. Newton received 11,601 votes.
- District 13: Albert Boutwell (inc.) received 40,706 votes.
- District 14: Albert Davis received 2,780 votes.
- District 15: Dave L. Yarbrough received 7,963 votes.
- District 16: Joe B. Davis received 873 votes.
- District 17: Tully A. Goodwin received 8,791 votes.
- District 18: H. P. James received 2,874 votes.
- District 19: Gerald Bradford received 5,027 votes.
- District 20: E. O. Eddins (inc.) received 1,691 votes.
- District 21: Ralph L. Jones received 8,664 votes.
- District 22: Roland Cooper received 1,139 votes; W. N. Bruce received 4 write-in votes.
- District 23: Neil Metcalf received 4,132 votes.
- District 24: George E. Little received 2,300 votes.
- District 25: Ben Reeves received 9,128 votes.
- District 26: Sam M. Englehardt Jr. received 2,510 votes.
- District 27: Joseph W. Smith received 5,431 votes.
- District 28: Vaughan Hill Robison (inc.) received 8,307 votes.
- District 29: M. H. Moses received 9,246 votes.
- District 30: Walter C. Givhan received 3,198 votes.
- District 31: Berry Lynchmore Cantrell received 10,651 votes.
- District 32: James S. Coleman Jr. received 1,990 votes.
- District 33: Garet Van Antwerp III received 17,401 votes.
- District 34: Staten Tate received 4,578 votes.
- District 35: Richmond Flowers received 3,955 votes.

== Democratic primary results ==
=== Runoff results by district ===
Candidates in boldface advanced to the general election. An asterisk (*) denotes a runoff winner who trailed in the first round.

District	Winner			Loser			Total		
District	Candidate	Votes	%	Candidate	Votes	%	Votes	Maj.	Mrg.
4th	**T. Herman Vann**	5,738	52.50%	Joe S. Foster (inc.)	5,192	47.50%	10,930	+546	+5.00%
5th	**Smith C. Dyar***	10,422	50.81%	T. C. Crain	10,089	49.19%	20,511	+333	+1.62%
6th	**E. L. Roberts**	12,417	53.14%	Rowan S. Bones	10,950	46.86%	23,367	+1,467	+6.28%
7th	**A. C. Shelton**	7,530	59.71%	Woodrow Howell	5,081	40.29%	12,611	+2,449	+19.42%
14th	**Albert Davis**	3,304	59.82%	Bob Langdon	2,219	40.18%	5,523	+1,085	+19.65%
31st	**Berry Lynchmore Cantrell**	12,428	66.22%	Mac McKinney	6,341	33.78%	18,769	+6,087	+32.43%
34th	**Staten Tate**	2,805	68.85%	Robert C. Smith	1,269	31.15%	4,074	+1,536	+37.70%
Sources: Birmingham Post-Herald, Piedmont Journal, Pickens County Herald and West Alabamian

Additionally, a runoff between Harlan G. Allen and Robert G. Werner was planned in District 3, but was cancelled after Werner withdrew, giving Allen the nomination.

=== First round results by district ===
Candidates in boldface advanced to either the general election or a runoff, first-place winners with an asterisk (*) did not face a runoff.

District	First place			Runners-up			Others			Total		
District	Candidate	Votes	%	Candidate	Votes	%	Candidate	Votes	%	Votes	Maj.	Mrg.
1st	**Milton C. Grisham***	9,978	58.08%	David U. Patton	7,203	41.92%	—	—	—	17,181	+2,775	+16.15%
2nd	**Joe Calvin***	9,708	53.75%	Wallace H. Meadows	8,355	46.25%	—	—	—	18,063	+1,353	+7.49%
3rd	**Harlan G. Allen**	8,169	42.41%	**Robert G. Werner**	**4,640**	**24.09%**	3 others (Note: Elwood Rutledge: 4,447 votes, 23.09%; Bart J. Cowart: 1,561 votes, 8.10%; J. W. Ayres: 443 votes, 2.30%)	6,451	33.49	19,260	+3,529	+18.32%
4th	**T. Herman Vann**	4,015	36.39%	**Joe S. Foster (inc.)**	**3,832**	**34.74%**	Earl E. Cloud	3,185	28.87%	11,032	+183	+1.66%
5th	**T. C. Crain**	7,787	37.23%	**Smith C. Dyar**	**6,806**	**32.54%**	Olin C. Hearn	6,321	30.22%	20,914	+981	+4.69%
6th	**E. L. Roberts**	12,061	43.50%	**Rowan S. Bones**	**9,445**	**34.06%**	Birch Andersen	6,223	22.44%	27,729	+2,616	+9.43%
7th	**A. C. Shelton**	6,840	46.08%	**Woodrow Howell**	**3,405**	**22.94%**	2 others (Note: Tom Blake Howle: 3,109 votes, 20.94%; M. J. Williams: 1,491 votes, 10.04%)	4,600	30.99%	14,845	+3,435	+23.14%
8th	**G. Kyser Leonard***	8,812	66.55%	Ben S. Hosey	4,429	33.45%	—	—	—	13,241	+4,383	+33.10%
9th	**George W. Yarbrough**	6,648	50.70%	Paul J. Hooton	6,464	49.30%	—	—	—	13,112	+184	+1.40%
10th	**Broughton Lamberth***	10,698	58.72%	Thomas S. Bugg	7,520	41.28%	—	—	—	18,218	+3,178	+17.44%
11th	**E. W. Skidmore (inc.)***	8,023	50.003%	Henry C. Bell	4,770	29.73%	Woody Townsend	3,252	20.27%	16,045	+3,253	+20.27%
12th	**Reuben L. Newton***	11,824	50.39%	Chester M. Black	7,599	32.38%	Jodie Vickery	4,043	17.23%	23,466	+4,225	+18.00%
13th	**Albert Boutwell (inc.)***	33,057	52.64%	John A. Jenkins	29,737	47.36%	—	—	—	62,794	+3,320	+5.29%
14th	**Albert Davis**	3,402	46.64%	**Bob Langdon**	**2,196**	**30.11%**	Roth E. Hook	1,696	23.25%	7,294	+1,206	+16.53%
15th	**Dave L. Yarbrough***	7,329	51.88%	H. Grady Kelly	6,798	48.12%	—	—	—	14,127	+531	+3.76%
16th	**Joe B. Davis***	1,162	61.45%	C. Mac Golson (inc.)	729	38.55%	—	—	—	1,891	+433	+22.90%
17th	**Tully A. Goodwin***	10,531	55.83%	Robert B. Albritton	8,330	44.17%	—	—	—	18,861	+2,201	+11.67%
18th	**H. P. James***	4,684	67.54%	Francis Pratt	2,251	32.46%	—	—	—	6,935	+2,433	+35.08%
19th	**Gerald Bradford***	6,746	52.26%	Earl Tucker	6,162	47.74%	—	—	—	12,908	+584	+4.52%
20th	**E. O. Eddins (inc.)***	2,513	55.28%	W. Clyde Waldrop	2,033	44.72%	—	—	—	4,546	+480	+10.56%
22nd	**Roland Cooper***	1,487	59.53%	J. M. Bonner (inc.)	1,011	40.47%	—	—	—	2,498	+476	+19.06%
23rd	**Neil Metcalf**	5,539	50.70%	J. Albert Hughes	5,387	49.30%	—	—	—	10,926	+152	+1.39%
24th	**George E. Little***	3,139	60.35%	William H. Robertson	1,608	30.92%	Christie G. Pappas	454	8.73%	5,201	+1,531	+29.44%
25th	**Ben Reeves***	9,979	58.96%	J. Roy Crow	6,947	41.04%	—	—	—	16,926	+3,032	+17.91%
26th	**Sam M. Engelhardt***	3,353	65.39%	Henry Neill Segrest	1,775	34.61%	—	—	—	5,128	+1,578	+30.77%
27th	**Joseph W. Smith***	7,559	61.91%	Jimmy Putnam	4,650	38.09%	—	—	—	12,209	+2,909	+23.83%
29th	**M. H. Moses***	6,889	57.76%	Warren McSpadden	5,037	42.24%	—	—	—	11,926	+1,852	+15.53%
31st	**Berry Lynchmore Cantrell**	9,166	40.96%	**Mac McKinney**	**4,975**	**22.23%**	2 others (Note: Paul Coburn: 4,154 votes, 18.56%; J. K. Johnson: 4,083 votes, 18.25%)	8,237	36.81%	22,378	+4,191	+18.73%
33rd	**Garet Van Antwerp***	17,567	58.62%	Thomas A. Johnston (inc.)	12,402	41.38%	—	—	—	29,969	+5,165	+17.23%
34th	**Staten Tate**	5,370	43.50%	**Robert C. Smith**	**4,329**	**35.06%**	J. C. Mims	2,647	21.44%	12,346	+1,041	+8.43%
35th	**Richmond M. Flowers***	5,705	56.55%	Dwight McInish	4,384	43.45%	—	—	—	10,089	+1,321	+13.09%
Source: Alabama Official and Statistical Register, 1955 (p. 558–560)

=== Nominated without opposition ===
The following candidates automatically won the Democratic nomination, as no opponent filed to run against them.

- District 21: Ralph L. Jones
- District 28: Vaughan Hill Robison (inc.)
- District 30: Walter C. Givhan
- District 32: James S. Coleman Jr.

== Republican candidate ==
Only one Republican, Warren Wallace Bailey, filed to run for the District 3 Senate seat against Democrat Harlan G. Allen. District 3 contained the counties of Blount, Cullman, and Winston, the latter of which being a Republican stronghold. He withdrew by September 8, leaving the Republicans with no state senate candidates.

== 1951–1954 special elections ==
=== District 17 ===
A special election in Senate District 17 (Butler–Conecuh–Covington) was triggered in September 1952 by the resignation of incumbent senator Senator T. Werth Thagard after being appointed to a circuit judgeship to succeed the late judge Arthur E. Gamble. The State Executive Democratic Committee chose Gamble's son, Arthur E. Gamble Jr., to succeed Thagard. Gamble Jr. did not face any opposition in the general election.

1952 Alabama Senate District 17 special general election November 4, 1952
Party	Candidate	Votes	%
Democratic	Arthur E. Gamble Jr.	Unopp.	

=== District 3 ===
A special election in Senate District 3 (Blount–Cullman–Winston) was triggered in July 1952 by the death of incumbent senator Ben Fant from a heart attack. Former state senator Bill E. James was nominated by the State Democratic Executive Committee in September 1952, and subsequently defeated Republican newspaper editor Henry Arnold by a sizable margin at the November general election.

1952 Alabama Senate District 17 special general election November 4, 1952 (unofficial results)
Party	Candidate	Votes	%
Democratic	Bill E. James	8,507	63.38%
Republican	Henry Arnold	4,915	36.62%
Total votes		13,422	100.00%

== See also ==
- Category:1954 elections in Alabama
  - 1954 United States Senate election in Alabama
  - 1954 United States House of Representatives elections in Alabama
  - 1954 Alabama gubernatorial election
- 1954 United States elections
