= Larry Dumas =

American politician (1908–1993)

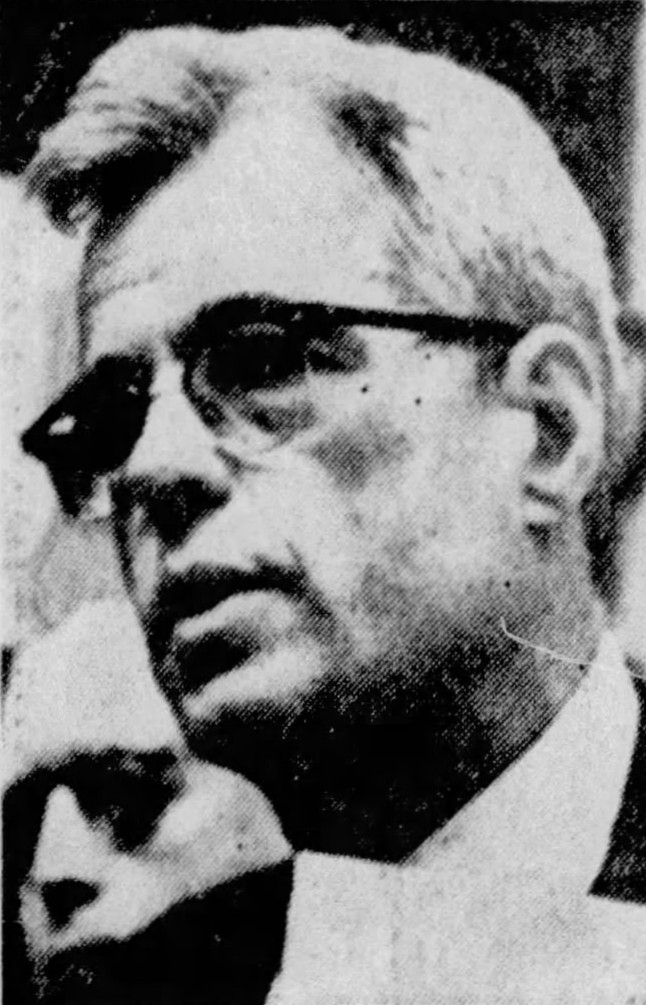

Member of the Alabama Senate from the 13th district
- In office November 5, 1958 – November 8, 1966
- Preceded by: Albert Boutwell
- Succeeded by: District abolished

Member of the Alabama House of Representatives from Jefferson County
- In office November 6, 1946 – November 2, 1954

Personal details
- Born: Lawrence Dumas Jr. October 12, 1908 Talladega, Alabama
- Died: June 11, 1993 (aged 84) Birmingham, Alabama
- Party: Democratic
- Spouse: Donald Berry (m. 1940)
- Education: Davidson College (AD); Harvard University (LLB)

Lawrence "Larry" Dumas Jr. (October 12, 1908 – June 11, 1993) was an American politician who served in the Alabama Senate from Alabama's 13th Senate district, representing all of Jefferson County from 1958 to 1966. A member of the Democratic Party, he had previously represented Jefferson County in the Alabama House of Representatives from 1946 to 1954.

== Early life and education ==
Larry Dumas was born Lawrence Dumas Jr. in Talladega, Alabama on October 12, 1908, to William Lawrence and Mary Dumas. He received an Associate's degree from Davidson College in Davidson, North Carolina, and received a Bachelor's degree in law from Harvard University. He practiced law in Birmingham, Alabama beginning 1936. He also received law degrees from George Washington University and Georgetown University.

== Career ==
Dumas co-founded the law firm Dumas, O'Niel & Hayes in 1947. In 1961, Dumas led a successful 96-hour filibuster, one of the longest in the state's history, to prevent the Senate from overriding a gubernatorial veto that would have split Jefferson County between four congressional districts, standing for 27 of the 96 hours. He unsuccessfully led an effort in 1965 to prevent a three-way split of the county. Jefferson was split between the 4th, 5th and 6th congressional districts.

Dumas attempted several times throughout his tenure to reapportion the Alabama State Legislature. Under the 1901 Alabama Constitution, individual counties could not have more than one senator, no matter how populated. He made an unsuccessful effort in 1965 to require at least one senator per 100,000 people, which would have sextupled Jefferson County's representation in the Senate. His plan to require the Alabama Supreme Court to redistrict the state legislature every 10 years if the legislature fails to do so was also defeated.

In 1959, Dumas sponsored a bill that would allow public schools threatened by racial integration to withdraw from the school system and operate independently.

Citing personal reasons, Dumas retired from elective office in 1966. He retired from law practice in 1983.

== Personal life and death ==
Dumas married Donald Berry in 1940, and had four children together. Dumas was a Methodist and a Freemason, teaching a Bible class at a Methodist church for many years. He received a William Booth Award from his work for the Salvation Army. Dumas died aged 84 on June 11, 1993.

== Electoral history ==
Alabama Senate election results, District 13 (1958–1962)
Election	Winner			Runners-up					
1962 gen	Larry Dumas (D)	60,968	100.00%	—			—		
1962 prim	Larry Dumas (D)	74,898	85.93%	Rush Lester (D)	7,415	8.51%	Pete Darabaris (D)	4,845	5.56%
1958 gen	Larry Dumas (D)	37,202	86.23%	John F. Dyer (R)	5,941	13.77%	—		
1958 prim	Larry Dumas (D)	47,128	56.58%	John A. Jenkins (D)	36,172	43.42%	—		

Alabama House of Representatives election results, Jefferson County (1946–1950)
Election	Candidate	Party	Votes	Pct.	Place
1950 gen	Larry Dumas	Democratic	29,673	14.26%	Elected; 6th of 7
1950 prim	Larry Dumas	Democratic	38,415	10.51%	Nominated; 1st of 23
1946 gen	Larry Dumas	Democratic	29,379	13.41%	Elected; 4th of 14
1946 runoff	Larry Dumas	Democratic	28,609	8.65%	Nominated; 1st of 14
1946 prim	Larry Dumas	Democratic	12,404	4.01%	Advanced; 7th of 36
