= 1958 Alabama Senate election =

- November 4, 1958

All 35 seats in the Alabama State Senate 18 seats needed for a majority
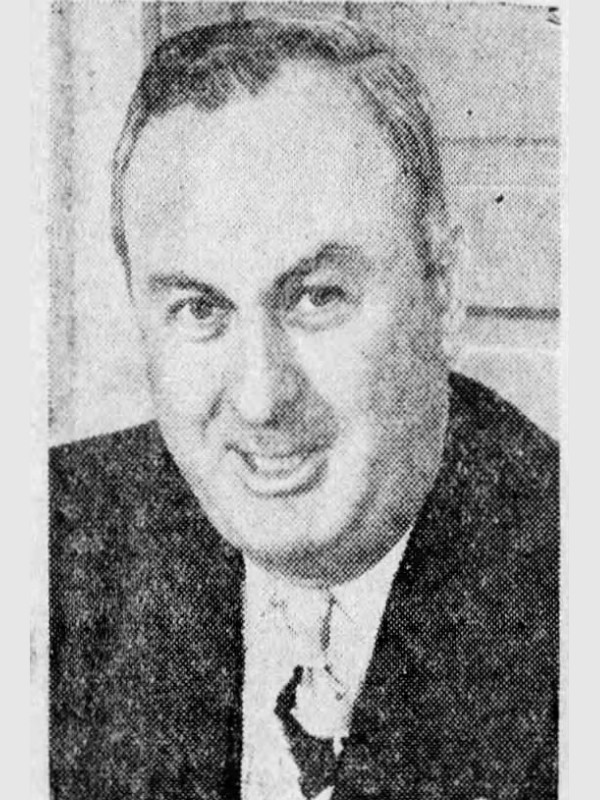

	Majority party	Minority party
Leader	Broughton Lamberth (did not stand)	—
Party	Democratic	Republican
Leader since	January 11, 1955	—
Leader's seat	10th–Tallapoosa Co.	—
Last election	35 seats, 99.9%	New
Seats won	35	0
Popular vote	229,542	5,941
Percentage	97.48%	2.52%
- Winners by vote share Democratic: 80–90% Unopposed
President pro tempore before election
Broughton Lamberth
Democratic
Elected President pro tempore
Vaughan Hill Robison
Democratic

The 1958 Alabama Senate election took place on Tuesday, November 4, 1958, to elect 35 representatives to serve four-year terms in the Alabama Senate. Across the 35 districts, only one, District 13 in Jefferson County, was actually at stake in the November general election. As the Democratic Party was dominant in the state, state legislative seats were generally decided at the Democratic primary election. This was the last time an Alabama Senate general election used the original 1901 district map, as district boundaries would be adjusted in July 1962.

This election saw numerous senators aligned with incumbent governor Jim Folsom lose their primaries, whether they were running for re-election or to some other office. Among this group was president pro tempore Broughton Lamberth of Tallapoosa County, who unsuccessfully ran for the state house.

The Democratic primary election was held on May 6 with runoff elections on June 3. The sole Republican candidate, John F. Dyer, was nominated by party convention on May 30.

At the beginning of the 1959 session, Vaughan Hill Robison of Montgomery County was unanimously elected president pro tempore.

== Summary ==
Party	Candidates			Seats		
Party	Num.	Vote	%	Before	Won	+/–
Democratic	35	229,542	97.48%	35	35	Steady
Republican	1	5,941	2.52%	0	0	Steady
Total	36	235,483	100%	35	35	Steady

== Incumbents ==
Every incumbent senator in a multi-county district chose not to seek re-election, as a gentlemen's agreement compelled state senators to give up their seats to allow a candidate from another county to serve.

=== Won re-election ===
- District 7: A. C. Shelton (Democratic) won re-election.
- District 8: G. Kyser Leonard (Democratic) won re-election.
- District 20: E. O. Eddins (Democratic) won re-election.
- District 22: Roland Cooper (Democratic) won re-election.
- District 28: Vaughan Hill Robison (Democratic) won re-election.
- District 30: Walter C. Givhan (Democratic) won re-election.

=== Eliminated in primary ===
- District 4: T. Herman Vann (Democratic) lost renomination to Dave Archer.
- District 16: Joe Davis (Democratic) lost renomination to Carl C. Golson.
- District 33: Garet Van Antwerp (Democratic) lost re-nomination to Will G. Caffey.

=== Did not seek re-election ===
- District 1: Milton C. Grisham (Democratic) did not seek re-election.
- District 2: Joe Calvin (Democratic) did not seek re-election.
- District 3: Harlan G. Allen (Democratic) unsuccessfully ran for probate judge of Cullman County.
- District 5: Smith C. Dyar (Democratic) unsuccessfully ran for probate judge of Marshall County.
- District 6: Escar Roberts (Democratic) did not seek re-election.
- District 9: George W. Yarbrough (Democratic) unsuccessfully ran for the state house seat in Randolph County.
- District 10: President pro tempore Broughton Lamberth (Democratic) unsuccessfully ran for the state house seat in Tallapoosa County.
- District 11: E. W. Skidmore (Democratic) unsuccessfully ran for lieutenant governor.
- District 12: Reuben L. Newton (Democratic) unsuccessfully ran for the first state house seat in Walker County.
- District 13: Albert Boutwell (Democratic) successfully ran for lieutenant governor.
- District 14: Albert Davis (Democratic) unsuccessfully ran for probate judge of Pickens County.
- District 15: Dave L. Yarbrough (Democratic) did not seek re-election.
- District 17: Tulley Goodwin (Democratic) unsuccessfully ran for the state house seat in Covington County.
- District 18: H. P. James (Democratic) did not seek re-election.
- District 19: Gerald Bradford (Democratic) did not seek re-election.
- District 21: Ralph L. Jones (Democratic) successfully ran for the state house seat in Monroe County.
- District 23: Neil Metcalf (Democratic) unsuccessfully ran for the state house seat in Geneva County.
- District 24: George E. Little (Democratic) successfully ran for probate judge of Clayton County.
- District 25: Ben Reeves (Democratic) unsuccessfully ran for probate judge of Pike County.
- District 26: Sam M. Engelhardt (Democratic) unsuccessfully ran for lieutenant governor.
- District 27: Joseph W. Smith (Democratic) successfully ran for the second state house seat in Russell County.
- District 29: M. H. Moses (Democratic) unsuccessfully ran for the state house seat in DeKalb County.
- District 31: Berry Lynchmore Cantrell (Democratic) unsuccessfully ran for the state house seat in Colbert County.
- District 32: David M. Hall (Democratic) unsuccessfully ran for the State Executive Democratic Committee from the 6th congressional district.
- District 34: Staten Tate (Democratic) unsuccessfully ran for the state house seat in Coosa County.
- District 35: Richmond Flowers Sr. (Democratic) unsuccessfully ran for attorney general.

== General election results ==
=== District 13 (Jefferson County) ===
District 13 election
Party	Candidate	Votes	%
Democratic	Larry Dumas	37,202	86.23%
Republican	John F. Dyer	5,941	13.77%
Total votes		43,143	100.00%

=== Elected without opposition ===
Every candidate elected with no opponents was a Democrat.

- District 1: Elbert Bertram Haltom Jr. (Democratic) received 5,917 votes.
- District 2: Robert R. Berryman (Democratic) received 6,597 votes.
- District 3: Elwood Rutledge (Democratic) received 10,792 votes.
- District 4: Dave Archer (Democratic) received 4,752 votes.
- District 5: D. Donald Word (Democratic) received 6,804 votes.
- District 6: Ray Wyatt (Democratic) received 12,088 votes.
- District 7: A. C. Shelton (inc., Democratic) received 5,874 votes.
- District 8: G. Kyser Leonard (inc., Democratic) received 4,919 votes.
- District 9: Bill Hines (Democratic) received 5,027 votes.
- District 10: Bud Woodall (Democratic) received 7,810 votes.
- District 11: Ryan deGraffenried Sr. (Democratic) received 5,664 votes.
- District 12: Woodrow Roberts (Democratic) received 10,287 votes.
- District 14: Aubrey Green (Democratic) received 2,788 votes.
- District 15: Joe Graham (Democratic) received 8,052 votes.
- District 16: Carl Golson (Democratic) received 822 votes.
- District 17: R. G. Kendall (Democratic) received 7,903 votes.
- District 18: Norman R. Crawford (Democratic) received 2,819 votes.
- District 19: Dennis Porter (Democratic) received 4,475 votes.
- District 20: E. O. Eddins (inc., Democratic) received 1,694 votes.
- District 21: Douglas Webb (Democratic) received 8,238 votes.
- District 22: Roland Cooper (inc., Democratic) received 1,031 votes.
- District 23: Rufus Barnett (Democratic) received 3,500 votes.
- District 24: Jimmy Clark (Democratic) received 1,510 votes.
- District 25: Alton Turner (Democratic) received 6,504 votes.
- District 26: Snag Andrews (Democratic) received 2,229 votes.
- District 27: Yetta Samford (Democratic) received 4,270 votes.
- District 28: Vaughan Hill Robison (inc., Democratic) received 9,333 votes.
- District 29: George Godfrey (Democratic) received 8,252 votes.
- District 30: Walter C. Givhan (inc., Democratic) received 2,353 votes.
- District 31: Hugh Moses (Democratic) received 9,753 votes.
- District 32: W. F. Wilson (Democratic) received 2,296 votes.
- District 33: Will G. Caffey (Democratic) received 10,185 votes.
- District 34: John E. Gaither (Democratic) received 4,401 votes.
- District 35: Carl S. Farmer (Democratic) received 3,401 votes.

== Democratic primary results ==
=== Runoff results by district ===
Candidates in boldface advanced to the general election. An asterisk (*) denotes a runoff winner who trailed in the first round.

District	Winner			Loser			Total		
District	Candidate	Votes	%	Candidate	Votes	%	Votes	Maj.	Mrg.
12th	Woodrow Roberts	13,973	55.37%	Thomas Veasey	11,263	44.63%	25,236	+2,710	+10.74%
19th	Dennis Porter	7,250	52.98%	Jack Miller	6,435	47.02%	13,685	+815	+5.96%
20th	E. O. Eddins (inc.)	2,142	52.44%	Edward W. Drinkhard	1,943	47.56%	4,085	+199	+4.87%
21st	Douglas S. Webb	10,356	53.52%	Claude D. Kelley	8,992	46.48%	19,348	+1,364	+7.05%
29th	George E. Godfrey	7,576	51.84%	J. B. Burkhalter	7,038	48.16%	14,614	+538	+3.68%
31st	Hugh Moses	11,634	51.29%	Solon Gregg	11,050	48.71%	22,684	+584	+2.57%
33rd	Will G. Caffey	17,625	50.45%	John M. Tyson	17,314	49.55%	34,939	+311	+0.89%
Source: Alabama Official and Statistical Register, 1959 (p. 594)

Additionally, runoffs in District 3, District 10, and District 24 were planned, but were canceled after candidates withdrew from their races. All three withdrawals were from candidates who placed second in the first round.

- District 3: Elwood Rutledge won the Democratic nomination after Raymond Lowery withdrew.
- District 10: W. Carvel Woodall won the Democratic nomination after Upshaw G. Jones withdrew.
- District 24: Jimmy Clark won the Democratic nomination after Charles L. Weston withdrew.

=== First round results by district ===
Candidates in boldface advanced to either the general election or a runoff, first-place winners with an asterisk (*) did not face a runoff.

District	First place			Runners-up			Others			Total		
District	Candidate	Votes	%	Candidate	Votes	%	Candidate	Votes	%	Votes	Maj.	Mrg.
2nd	**Robert R. Berryman***	11,140	63.52%	J. B. Richardson	6,399	36.48%	—	—	—	17,539	+4,741	+27.03%
3rd	**Elwood Rutledge**	7,394	39.59%	**Raymond Lowery**	**6,744**	**36.11%**	Claude B. McCurry	4,540	24.31%	18,678	+650	+3.48%
4th	**Dave Archer***	5,991	53.82%	Herman Vann (inc.)	5,141	46.18%	—	—	—	11,132	+850	+7.64%
5th	**D. Donald Word***	13,203	69.81%	Robert Sebring	5,710	30.19%	—	—	—	18,913	+7,493	+39.62%
6th	**Ray Wyatt***	21,394	86.74%	L. R. Johnston	3,271	13.26%	—	—	—	24,665	+18,123	+73.48%
7th	**A. C. Shelton (inc.)***	7,513	52.66%	R. J. Holley	5,104	35.77%	Elvin McCary	1,650	11.57%	14,267	+2,409	+16.89%
8th	**G. Kyser Leonard (inc.)***	6,401	51.92%	Graham Wright	5,928	48.08%	—	—	—	12,329	+473	+3.84%
9th	**W. C. Hines***	8,744	67.79%	E. O. Noel	2,272	17.62%	H. O. Humphrey	1,882	14.59%	12,898	+6,472	+50.18%
10th	**W. Carvel Woodall**	7,060	43.37%	**Upshaw G. Jones**	**4,615**	**28.35%**	Mac W. Freeman	4,605	28.29%	16,280	+2,445	+15.02%
12th	**J. Thomas Veazey**	9,437	37.89%	**Woodrow Roberts**	**8,752**	**35.14%**	2 others (Note: Fuller Kimbrell: 5,171 votes, 20.76%; D. C. Grey: 1,548 votes, 6.21%)	6,719	26.98%	24,908	+685	+2.75%
13th	**Larry Dumas***	47,128	56.58%	John A. Jenkins	36,172	43.42%	—	—	—	83,300	+10,956	+13.15%
14th	**Aubrey Green***	3,670	61.40%	Marcus McConnell	2,307	38.60%	—	—	—	5,977	+1,363	+22.80%
15th	**Joe W. Graham***	9,157	58.40%	Alex Hayes	6,524	41.60%	—	—	—	15,681	+2,633	+16.79%
16th	**Carl C. Golson***	1,138	59.58%	Joe Davis (inc.)	772	40.42%	—	—	—	1,910	+366	+19.16%
18th	**Norman R. Crawford***	4,377	68.25%	Judson C. Locke	2,036	31.75%	—	—	—	6,413	+2,341	+36.50%
19th	**Dennis Porter**	6,141	42.12%	**Jack Miller**	**4,558**	**31.26%**	Grady W. Hurst	3,882	26.62%	14,581	+1,583	+10.86%
20th	**E. O. Eddins (inc.)**	1,709	40.50%	**Edward W. Drinkard**	**1,383**	**32.77%**	W. Clyde Waldrop	1,128	26.73%	4,220	+326	+7.73%
21st	**Douglas S. Webb**	8,562	38.89%	**Claude D. Kelley**	**7,708**	**35.01%**	Malcolm Edwards	5,747	26.10%	22,017	+854	+3.88%
22nd	**Roland Cooper (inc.)***	1,595	64.47%	Josiah R. Bonner	879	35.53%	—	—	—	2,474	+716	+28.94%
23rd	**Rugus Barnett***	6,140	55.62%	Mike Sollie III	4,899	44.38%	—	—	—	11,039	+1,241	+11.24%
24th	**Jimmy Clark**	2,140	40.74%	**Charles L. Weston**	**1,546**	**29.43%**	2 others (Note: Marvin E. Edwards: 1,286 votes, 24.48%; Christie Pappas: 281 votes, 5.35%)	1,567	29.83%	5,253	+594	+11.31%
25th	**Alton L. Turner***	8,776	51.65%	Vernon Summerlin	8,216	48.35%	—	—	—	16,992	+560	+3.30%
27th	**Yetta Samford***	6,462	54.36%	Ealon M. Lambert	5,426	45.64%	—	—	—	11,888	+1,036	+8.71%
28th	**Vaughan H. Robison (inc.)***	17,388	81.78%	Ed Brown	3,875	18.22%	—	—	—	21,263	+13,513	+63.55%
29th	**J. B. Burkhalter**	5,232	34.90%	**George E. Godfrey**	**3,745**	**24.98%**	2 others (Note: Virgil M. Smith: 3,354 votes, 22.37%; Speer Livingston: 2,659 votes, 17.74%)	6,013	40.11%	14,990	+1,487	+9.92%
31st	**Solon Gregg**	10,156	45.78%	**Hugh Moses**	**9,844**	**44.37%**	J. Marvin Davis	2,184	9.84%	22,184	+312	+1.41%
33rd	**John M. Tyson**	14,502	41.34%	**Will G. Caffey**	**12,798**	**36.48%**	Garet Van Antwerp (inc.)	7,780	22.18%	35,080	+1,704	+4.86%
34th	**John E. Gaither***	6,375	56.23%	Ed H. McBryde	4,963	43.77%	—	—	—	11,338	+1,412	+12.45%
35th	**Carl S. Farmer***	7,841	62.92%	M. W. Espy Jr.	4,621	37.08%	—	—	—	12,462	+3,220	+25.84%
Source: The Montgomery Advertiser

=== Nominated without opposition ===
The following candidates automatically won the Democratic nomination, as no opponent filed to run against them.

- District 1: Elbert Bertram Haltom Jr.
- District 11: Ryan deGraffenried Sr.
- District 17: R. G. Kendall
- District 26: Snag Andrews
- District 30: Walter C. Givhan (inc.)
- District 32: W. F. Wilson

== Republican convention ==
Only one Republican, John F. Dyer, sought election to the state senate. Dyer was nominated at the Jefferson County Republican party convention on May 9, and was subsequently confirmed at the state convention on May 30. About a dozen Republican state house candidates were also nominated. He opposed Democratic nominee Larry Dumas at the general election and lost by 72.46 percentage points.

== 1955–1958 special elections ==
=== District 32 ===
A special election in Senate District 32 (Greene–Hale) was triggered by the resignation of incumbent senator James S. Coleman after being elected to the Alabama Supreme Court in January 1957. Attorney and former state house member David Hall was selected by the Democratic executive committee to succeed Coleman. The general election was canceled as no other candidate filed to run against Hall, and he was certified as the winner.

1957 Alabama Senate District 32 special general election April 30, 1957 (canceled)
Party	Candidate	Votes	%
Democratic	David Hall	Unopp.	

== See also ==
- 1958 United States House of Representatives elections in Alabama
- 1958 Alabama gubernatorial election
