= 1962 Alabama Senate election =

- November 6, 1962

All 35 seats in the Alabama State Senate 18 seats needed for a majority
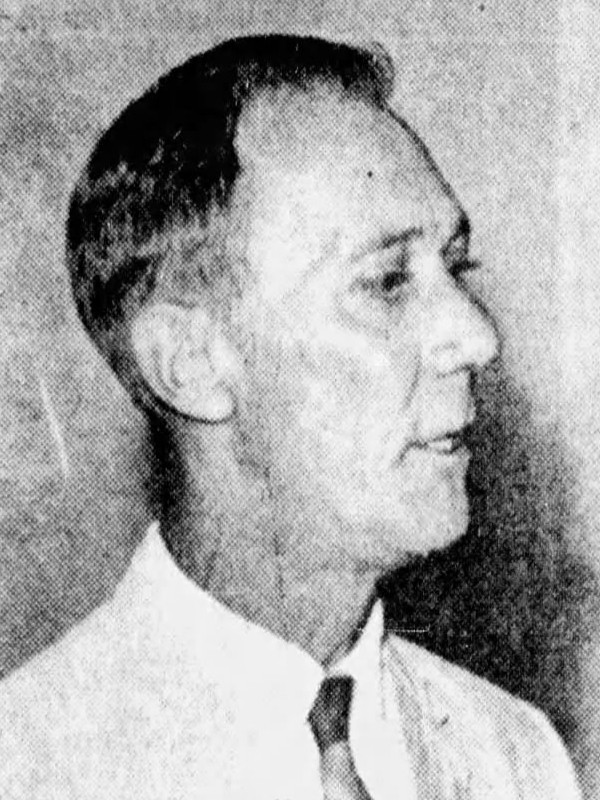

	Majority party	Minority party
Leader	Vaughan Hill Robison (retired as leader)	—
Party	Democratic	Republican
Leader since	January 13, 1959	—
Leader's seat	28th–Montgomery Co.	—
Last election	35 seats, 97.5%	0 seats, 2.5%
Seats won	35	0
Popular vote	281,022	30,566
Percentage	90.18%	9.81%
- Winners by vote share Democratic: 50–60% 60–70% 70–80% 80–90% Unopposed
President pro tempore before election
Vaughan Hill Robison
Democratic
Elected President pro tempore
George C. Hawkins
Democratic

The 1966 Alabama Senate election took place on Tuesday, November 8, 1966, to elect 35 representatives to serve four-year terms in the Alabama Senate. Across the 35 districts, only 6 seats were actually at stake in the November general election. As the Democratic Party was dominant in the state, state legislative seats were generally decided at the Democratic primary election. This was the first Senate election since a federal court ordered the first legislative reapportionment in the state since 1901.

The Democratic primaries were held on May 1 with a runoff on May 29. Due to late-term redistricting in July 1962, two special Democratic primaries had to be held on August 28 with runoffs on September 11. In the new District 22 (Blount–St. Clair), no candidate from either county won a Senate nomination in the regular Democratic primary, and the new District 30 (Dallas–Lowndes) had its regular primary in Lowndes County voided.

At the beginning of the 1963 session, George C. Hawkins of Etowah was unanimously elected president pro tempore.

== Redistricting ==
District map of the Alabama Senate before and after the July 1962 reapportionment. Districts in gray did not have their boundaries changed.

For the 1962 election, the legislature adopted a new state senate map, the first reapportionment since 1901. A few counties were swapped around, but rural areas of the state still had an overwhelming advantage in terms of representation. The legislature would be forced to create a fairer senate map which would be in force by the 1966 general election.

=== Counties shuffled ===
Counties in italics were removed from the district, and counties in boldface were added. Districts and counties not listed here were not affected in the redistricting. 11 districts had their boundaries changed as a result of 8 county shuffles.

District	Before	After
3rd	Blount–Cullman–Winston	Cullman–Winston
6th	Etowah–St. Clair	Etowah
12th	Fayette–Lamar–Walker	Fayette–Walker
14th	Pickens–Sumter	**Lamar**–Pickens
16th	Lowndes	**Monroe–Wilcox**
20th	Marengo	Marengo–**Sumter**
21st	Baldwin–Escambia–Monroe	Baldwin–Escambia
22nd	Wilcox	**Blount–St. Clair**
24th	Barbour	Barbour–**Pike**
25th	Coffee–Crenshaw–Pike	Coffee–Crenshaw
30th	Dallas	Dallas–**Lowndes**

=== Deviation ===
The table below will show the most-populated and least-populated senate districts under the 1901 and 1962 apportionment plans. The population of Alabama at the 1960 census was 3,266,740, with an ideal population of 93,335 people under a 35-district plan.

Plan	District	Population	% of ideal	Diff.
1901	Jefferson	634,864	680.20%	41.17
1901	Lowndes	15,417	16.52%	41.17
1962	Jefferson	634,864	680.20%	20.01
1962	Bibb–Perry	31,715	33.98%	20.01

== Summary ==
Party	Candidates			Seats		
Party	Num.	Vote	%	Before	Won	+/–
Democratic	35	281,022	90.18%	35	35	Steady
Republican	6	30,566	9.81%	0	0	Steady
Write-in		25	0.01%	—	0	Steady
Total	41	311,613	100%	35	35	Steady

== Incumbents ==
District	Incumbent	Party	Elected Senator	Party
1st	Bert Haltom	Dem	Ed Norton	Dem
2nd	Robert R. Berryman	Dem	Bob Gilchrist	Dem
3rd	Elwood Rutledge	Dem	Harlan G. Allen	Dem
4th	Billy Laxson (Note: Serving since a June 21, 1962 special election)	Dem	Roscoe O. Roberts	Dem
5th	D. Donald Word	Dem	Clayton Carter	Dem
6th	Ray Wyatt	Dem	George C. Hawkins	Dem
7th	A. C. Shelton	Dem	A. C. Shelton	Dem
8th	G. Kyser Leonard	Dem	Bill Nichols	Dem
9th	Bill Hines	Dem	Julian Lowe	Dem
10th	Upshaw G. Jones (Note: Serving since a May 12, 1959 special election)	Dem	Sonny Hornsby	Dem
11th	Ryan deGraffenried Sr.	Dem	Bill McCain	Dem
12th	Woodrow Roberts	Dem	Bob Wilson	Dem
13th	Larry Dumas	Dem	Larry Dumas	Dem
14th	Aubrey Green	Dem	Gaillard Robison	Dem
15th	Joe Graham	Dem	Jimmy McDow	Dem
16th	Carl Golson	Dem	Roland Cooper	Dem
17th	Bob Kendall	Dem	H. B. Taylor	Dem
18th	Norman Crawford	Dem	H. P. James	Dem
19th	Dennis Porter	Dem	Albert H. Evans	Dem
20th	E. O. Eddins	Dem	E. O. Eddins	Dem
21st	Douglas Webb	Dem	L. W. Brannon	Dem
22nd	Roland Cooper	Dem	Roland Cooper	Dem
23rd	Rufus Barnett	Dem	Neil Metcalf	Dem
24th	Jimmy Clark	Dem	Jimmy Clark	Dem
25th	Alton Turner	Dem	W. Ray Lolley	Dem
26th	Snag Andrews	Dem	Ed Reynolds	Dem
27th	Yetta Samford	Dem	Joseph W. Smith	Dem
28th	Vaughn Hill Robison	Dem	Vaughn Hill Robison	Dem
29th	George Godfrey	Dem	Kenneth Hammond	Dem
30th	Walter C. Givhan	Dem	Walter C. Givhan	Dem
31st	Hugh Moses	Dem	W. Emmett Oden	Dem
32nd	Flute Wilson	Dem	Charles A. Montgomery	Dem
33rd	Will Caffey	Dem	John M. Tyson	Dem
34th	John Gaither	Dem	Pete Mathews	Dem
35th	Carl Farmer	Dem	Charlie Adams	Dem

=== Won re-election ===
- District 7: A. C. Shelton (Democratic) won re-election.
- District 13: Larry Dumas (Democratic) won re-election.
- District 20: E. O. Eddins (Democratic) won re-election.
- District 22: Roland Cooper (Democratic) won re-election.
- District 24: Jimmy Clark (Democratic) won re-election.
- District 28: Vaughn Hill Robison (Democratic) won re-election.
- District 30: Walter C. Givhan (Democratic) won re-election.

=== Eliminated in primary ===
- District 8: G. Kyser Leonard (Democratic) lost re-nomination to Bill Nichols.
- District 16: Carl Golson (Democratic) appeared to lose the regular Democratic primary and attempted to contest the election; withdrew contest after new legislative maps were put in place.

=== Did not seek re-election ===
- District 1: Bert Haltom (Democratic) unsuccessfully ran for lieutenant governor.
- District 2: Robert R. Berryman (Democratic) unsuccessfully ran for the House seat in Lawrence County.
- District 3: Elwood Rutledge (Democratic) retired.
- District 4: Billy Laxson (Democratic) retired.
- District 5: D. Donald Word (Democratic) retired.
- District 6: Ray Wyatt (Democratic) retired.
- District 9: Bill Hines (Democratic) unsuccessfully ran for the 2nd place House seat in Chambers County.
- District 10: Upshaw G. Jones (Democratic) retired.
- District 11: Ryan deGraffenried Sr. (Democratic) unsuccessfully ran for governor.
- District 12: Woodrow Roberts (Democratic) retired.
- District 14: Aubrey Green (Democratic) retired to serve as the international president of Lions Club International.
- District 15: Joe Graham (Democratic) unsuccessfully ran for the State Democratic Executive Committee.
- District 17: Bob Kendall (Democratic) retired.
- District 18: Norman Crawford (Democratic) retired.
- District 19: Dennis Porter (Democratic) retired.
- District 21: Douglas Webb (Democratic) retired.
- District 23: Rufus Barnett (Democratic) retired.
- District 25: Alton Turner (Democratic) successfully ran for the House seat in Crenshaw County.
- District 26: Snag Andrews (Democratic) retired.
- District 27: Yetta Samford (Democratic) retired.
- District 29: George Godfrey (Democratic) unsuccessfully ran for the House seat in Cherokee County.
- District 31: Hugh Moses (Democratic) retired.
- District 32: Flute Wilson (Democratic) unsuccessfully ran for Agriculture Commissioner.
- District 33: Will Caffey (Democratic) retired.
- District 34: John Gaither (Democratic) retired.
- District 35: Carl Farmer (Democratic) retired.

== General election results ==
=== By district ===
District	Democratic			Republican			Total		
District	Candidate	Votes	%	Candidate	Votes	%	Votes	Maj.	Mrg.
1st	Ed Norton	8,962	81.67%	J. C. Mauldin	2,011	18.33%	10,973	+6,951	+63.35%
3rd	Harlan G. Allen	7,441	54.02%	H. Guy Hunt	6,334	45.98%	13,775	+1,107	+8.04%
15th	Jimmy McDow	6,898	65.53%	Emmett D. Wyatt	3,628	34.47%	10,526	+3,270	+31.07%
17th	H. B. Taylor	6,535	68.56%	J. R. Bennett	2,997	31.44%	9,532	+3,538	+37.12%
28th	Vaughan Hill Robison	10,228	54.41%	Perry O. Hooper	8,569	45.59%	18,797	+1,659	+8.83%
33rd	John M. Tyson	24,430	77.66%	W. D. Carson	7,027	22.34%	31,457	+17,403	+55.32%
Source: Alabama Official and Statistical Register, 1963 (p. 777–782)

=== Elected without opposition ===
Every candidate elected with no opponents was a Democrat.

- District 2: Bob Gilchrist was elected with 9,522 votes.
- District 4: Roscoe O. Roberts was elected with 9,541 votes.
- District 5: Clayton Carter was elected with 6,875 votes. 8 other votes were cast.
- District 6: George Hawkins was elected with 9,877 votes. other votes were cast.
- District 7: A. C. Shelton was elected with 6,500 votes. 1 other vote was cast.
- District 8: Bill Nichols was elected with 5,370 votes. 1 other vote was cast.
- District 9: Julian Lowe was elected with 4,335 votes.
- District 10: Sonny Hornsby was elected with 5,250 votes.
- District 11: Bill McCain was elected with 7,905 votes.
- District 12: Bob Wilson was elected with 8,574 votes.
- District 13: Larry Dumas was elected with 60,968 votes.
- District 14: Gaillard Robison was elected with 2,574 votes.
- District 16: Roland Cooper was elected with 2,905 votes.
- District 18: H. P. James was elected with 3,084 votes.
- District 19: Albert H. Evans was elected with 3,779 votes. 7 other votes were cast.
- District 20: E. O. Eddins was elected with 2,712 votes. 2 other votes were cast.
- District 21: L. W. Brannon was elected with 8,529 votes. 1 other vote was cast.
- District 22: L. D. Bentley was elected with 5,695 votes.
- District 23: Neil Metcalf was elected with 3,827 votes.
- District 24: Jimmy Clark was elected with 3,906 votes.
- District 25: W. Ray Lolley was elected with 5,317 votes.
- District 26: Ed Reynolds was elected with 3,185 votes.
- District 27: Joseph W. Smith was elected with 3,610 votes. 1 other vote was cast.
- District 29: Kenneth Hammond was elected with 7,470 votes.
- District 30: Walter C. Givhan was elected with 4,599 votes.
- District 31: W. Emmett Oden was elected with 10,569 votes.
- District 32: Charles A. Montgomery was elected with 2,294 votes. 1 other vote was cast.
- District 34: Pete Matthews was elected with 2,836 votes. 2 other votes were cast.
- District 35: Charlie Adams was elected with 4,920 votes. 1 other vote was cast.

== Special Democratic primary elections ==
=== District 22 ===
The first round of the special Democratic primary saw representative Rush "Doc" Smith beat out Roy H. Coshatt for the second-place spot in the runoff by a single vote. After the results were made official, Coshatt decided to contest the election results. His case was thrown out by the state Democratic executive committee, allowing Smith to advance to the September runoff. Smith lost the runoff by 442 votes to radio executive L. D. Bentley.

District 22 special Democratic primary, first round August 28, 1962
Party	Candidate	Votes	%
Democratic	→ L. D. Bentley	1,461	32.37%
Democratic	→ Doc Smith	1,047	23.19%
Democratic	Roy H. Coshatt	1,046	23.17%
Democratic	Ralph LeCroy	548	12.14%
Democratic	Oscar N. Fouts	412	9.13%
Total votes		4,514	100.00%

District 22 special Democratic primary, runoff September 11, 1962
Party	Candidate	Votes	%
Democratic	L. D. Bentley	3,285	53.61%
Democratic	Doc Smith	2,843	46.39%
Total votes		6,128	100.00%

=== District 30 ===
In the regular Senate primary in Lowndes County, the results were thrown out by the state Democratic executive committee amid allegations of voting irregularies. The official tally had Caswell McCurdy ahead of incumbent senator Carl Golson 936–934. The July redistricting plan saw the Dallas County and Lowndes County senate districts combine, and thus the winner of the Lowndes primary would face off against senator Walter C. Givhan, the winner of the Dallas primary, in August. Both McCurdy and Golson withdrew their claims to the Lowndes nomination, allowing Givhan to advance to the general election.

District 30 special Democratic primary August 28, 1962
Party	Candidate	Votes	%
Democratic	Walter C. Givhan (inc.)	Unopp.	

== Democratic primary results ==
=== Runoff results by district ===
Candidates in boldface advanced to the general election. An asterisk (*) denotes a runoff winner who trailed in the first round.

District	Winner			Loser			Total		
District	Candidate	Votes	%	Candidate	Votes	%	Votes	Maj.	Mrg.
5th	**Clayton Carter**	12,128	59.60%	Clark E. Johnson	8,222	40.40%	20,350	+3,906	+19.19%
11th	**Bill McCain***	9,165	52.89%	Arthur Ferguson	8,162	47.11%	17,327	+1,003	+5.79%
12th	**Bob Wilson**	12,280	53.03%	W. C. Walker	10,876	46.97%	23,156	+1,404	+6.06%
14th	**Gaillard Robison**	3,590	56.38%	Henry McDaniel	2,778	43.62%	6,368	+812	+12.75%
21st	**L. W. Brannan**	10,568	51.77%	W. M. Hodgson	9,845	48.23%	20,413	+723	+3.54%
34th	**Pete Mathews**	6,363	58.47%	DeForest Nolen	4,519	41.53%	10,882	+1,844	+16.95%
Source: Alabama Official and Statistical Register, 1963 (p. 759)

Additionally, runoffs in District 32 and District 33 were planned, but were canceled after candidates withdrew from their races. Both withdrawals were from candidates who placed second in the first round.

- District 32: Charles Montgomery won the Democratic nomination after S. D. Bayer withdrew.
- District 33: John M. Tyson won the Democratic nomination after Thomas M. Galloway withdrew.

=== First round results by district ===
Candidates in boldface advanced to either the general election or a runoff, first-place winners with an asterisk (*) did not face a runoff.

District	First place			Runners-up			Others			Total		
District	Candidate	Votes	%	Candidate	Votes	%	Candidate	Votes	%	Votes	Maj.	Mrg.
1st	**Ed Horton***	**8,678**	**58.96%**	David Grisham	6,040	41.04%	—	—	—	14,718	+2,638	+17.92%
2nd	**Bob Gilchrist***	**10,697**	**54.37%**	Alvis G. Briscoe	5,758	29.27%	Bill Chenault	3,219	16.36%	19,674	+4,939	+25.10%
3rd	**Mutt Allen***	**9,016**	**51.72%**	L. D. Bentley	8,416	48.28%	—	—	—	17,432	+600	+3.44%
4th	**Roscoe Roberts***	**11,877**	**85.70%**	Bob Schwenn	1,982	14.30%	—	—	—	13,859	+9,895	+71.40%
5th	**Clayton Carter**	**8,803**	**48.53%**	**Clark Johnson**	**5,514**	**30.40%**	O. G. Whitaker	3,823	21.07%	18,140	+3,289	+18.13%
6th	**George C. Hawkins***	**16,262**	**61.57%**	Rowan S. Bone	10,151	38.43%	—	—	—	26,413	+6,111	+23.14%
7th	**A. C. Shelton (inc.)***	**7,712**	**60.19%**	Robert M. Parker	5,101	39.81%	—	—	—	12,813	+2,611	+20.38%
8th	**Bill Nichols***	**7,324**	**58.21%**	G. Kyser Leonard (inc.)	5,259	41.79%	—	—	—	12,583	+2,065	+16.41%
9th	**Julian Lowe***	**5,574**	**50.87%**	Jimmy Jenkins	2,759	25.18%	Buck Bailey	2,625	23.96%	10,958	+2,815	+25.69%
10th	**Sonny Hornsby***	**9,606**	**60.91%**	Tom Johnson	6,164	39.09%	—	—	—	15,770	+3,442	+21.83%
11th	**Arthur Ferguson**	**6,971**	**41.39%**	**Bill McCain**	**5,177**	**30.73%**	Jack McGuire	4,696	27.88%	16,844	+1,794	+10.65%
12th	**Bob Wilson**	**8,284**	**35.43%**	**Carey Walker**	**7,742**	**33.11%**	Reuben Newton	7,357	31.46%	23,383	+542	+2.32%
13th	**Larry Dumas (inc.)**	**74,898**	**85.93%**	Rush Lester	7,415	8.51%	Pete Darabaris	4,845	5.56%	87,158	+67,483	+77.43%
14th	**Gaillard Robison**	**2,754**	**42.34%**	**Henry McDaniel**	**2,357**	**36.24%**	James Swedenburg	1,393	21.42%	6,504	+397	+6.10%
15th	**Jimmy McDow***	**8,373**	**54.81%**	Fred Phillips	4,297	28.13%	Harold Harlin	2,606	17.06%	15,276	+4,076	+26.68%
16th (Note: Election contested, both candidates withdrew after the July redistricting)	Caswell McCurdy	936	50.05%	Carl Golson (inc.)	934	49.95%	—	—	—	1,870	+2	+0.10%
17th	**H. B. Taylor***	**8,505**	**52.79%**	J. Brunson Kierce	7,607	47.21%	—	—	—	16,112	+898	+5.57%
18th	**H. P. James***	**4,369**	**73.69%**	Fritz Jones	1,560	26.31%	—	—	—	5,929	+2,809	+47.38%
19th	**Albert H. Evans***	**8,047**	**66.89%**	Julian A. Watters	3,984	33.11%	—	—	—	12,031	+4,063	+33.77%
21st	**L. W. Brannan**	**7,994**	**37.02%**	**W. M. Hodgson**	**7,145**	**33.09%**	C. LeNoir Thompson	6,452	29.88%	21,591	+849	+3.93%
23rd	**Neil Metcalf***	**6,368**	**62.98%**	Bud Boswell	3,743	37.02%	—	—	—	10,111	+2,625	+25.96%
24th	**Jimmy Clark (inc.)***	**3,682**	**85.02%**	Thomas L. Manley	649	14.98%	—	—	—	4,331	+3,033	+70.03%
25th	**Ray Lolley***	**8,381**	**56.30%**	Bill Stokes	6,506	43.70%	—	—	—	14,887	+1,875	+12.59%
26th	**Ed Reynolds***	**4,315**	**80.90%**	Grady Rogers	1,019	19.10%	—	—	—	5,334	+3,296	+61.79%
27th	**Joseph W. Smith***	**5,510**	**50.04%**	Bowen Brassell	4,240	38.50%	Zeke Calhoun	1,262	11.46%	11,012	+1,270	+11.53%
29th	**Kenneth Hammond***	**6,861**	**50.15%**	Chad B. Hawkins	6,820	49.85%	—	—	—	13,681	+41	+0.30%
31st	**W. Emmett Oden***	**11,329**	**51.42%**	Anderson Berryman	10,705	48.58%	—	—	—	22,034	+624	+2.83%
32nd	**Charles Montgomery**	**1,840**	**46.64%**	**S. D. Bayer**	**1,075**	**27.25%**	Pete Martin	1,030	26.11%	3,945	+765	+19.39%
33rd	**John M. Tyson**	**17,122**	**41.97%**	**Thomas M. Galloway**	**10,368**	**25.42%**	2 others (Note: Huston Carter: 8,384 votes, 20.55%; Ernest Megginson: 4,918 votes, 12.06%)	13,302	32.61%	40,792	+6,754	+16.56%
34th	**Pete Mathews**	**4,718**	**44.58%**	**DeForest Nolen**	**3,421**	**32.33%**	M. J. Norrell	2,444	23.09%	10,583	+1,297	+12.26%
35th	**Charlie Adams***	**7,635**	**64.01%**	Jimmy Thrower	4,292	35.99%	—	—	—	11,927	+3,343	+28.03%
Source: Alabama Official and Statistical Register, 1963 (p. 722–726)

=== Nominated without opposition ===
The following candidates automatically won the Democratic nomination, as no opponent filed to run against them.

- District 20: E. O. Eddins (inc.)
- District 22: Roland Cooper (inc.)
- District 28: Vaughn Hill Robison (inc.)
- District 30: Walter C. Givhan (inc.)

== 1959–1962 special elections ==
=== District 10 ===
A special election in Senate District 10 (Elmore–Tallapoosa) was triggered by the death of incumbent senator Carvel Woodall on February 19, 1959. The Democratic executive committee chose to nominate a candidate instead of holding a primary. Upshaw Jones, the runner-up in the 1958 Democratic primary, was the only candidate certified for the ballot, and thus the special general election was canceled.

1959 Alabama Senate District 30 special general election May 12, 1959
Party	Candidate	Votes	%
Democratic	Upshaw Jones	Unopp.	

=== District 4 ===
A special election in District 4 (Madison) was triggered by the resignation of Dave Archer upon his appointment to a circuit judgeship in late 1961. James Record, the clerk-auditor of Madison County, was the only candidate certified for the ballot.

January 1962 Alabama Senate District 4 special general election January 2, 1962
Party	Candidate	Votes	%
Democratic	James Record	Unopp.	

The second special election was triggered when the recently-elected James Record was appointed to the Madison County Board of Commissioners in March 1962. Record was succeeded by Billy Laxson.

June 1962 Alabama Senate District 4 special general election June 22, 1962
Party	Candidate	Votes	%
Democratic	Billy Laxson	3,472	68.12%
Republican	Morton Hutchens	1,624	31.86%
Write-in	O. G. Pitts	1	0.02%
Total votes		5,097	100.00%

== See also ==
- 1962 United States Senate election in Alabama
- 1962 United States House of Representatives elections in Alabama
- 1962 Alabama gubernatorial election
