= 1972 Alabama Supreme Court election =

- November 7, 1972

The 1972 Alabama Supreme Court election was held on November 7, 1972 to elect two justices to the Alabama Supreme Court.

== Place 1 ==
1972 Alabama Supreme Court election, Place 1
Candidate	Richard L. Jones
Party	Democratic
Popular vote	481,354
Percentage	100.00%
- County results Jones: 90-100%

=== Democratic primary ===
==== Candidates ====
===== Nominee =====
- Richard L. Jones

===== Eliminated in primary =====
- Janie Shores, law professor

=== General election ===
==== Results ====
1970 Alabama Supreme Court associate justice election, Place 1
Party	Candidate	Votes	%
Democratic	Richard L. Jones	481,354	100.00
Total votes		481,354	100.00

== Place 2 ==
1972 Alabama Supreme Court election, Place 2
Candidate	James H. Faulkner
Party	Democratic
Popular vote	483,537
Percentage	100.00%
- County results Faulkner: 90-100%

=== Democratic primary ===
==== Candidates ====
===== Nominee =====
- James H. Faulkner

=== General election ===
==== Results ====
1970 Alabama Supreme Court associate justice election, Place 2
Party	Candidate	Votes	%
Democratic	James H. Faulkner	483,517	100.00
Total votes		483,517	100.00
