= Walter C. Givhan =

American politician (1902–1976)

Member of the Alabama Senate
- In office November 3, 1954 – February 18, 1976
- Succeeded by: Earl Goodwin
- Constituency: 30th (1954–1966); 14th (1966–1974); 29th (1974–1976)

Member of the Alabama House of Representatives from Dallas County
- In office November 4, 1942 – November 3, 1954
- Preceded by: James A. Hare Jr.
- Succeeded by: Val Hain
- In office November 5, 1930 – November 7, 1934
- Preceded by: Clifton Kirkpatrick
- Succeeded by: Reuben F. Hamner

Personal details
- Born: Walter Coats Givhan; May 7, 1902 Perry, Alabama, U.S.
- Died: February 18, 1976 (aged 73) Safford, Alabama, U.S.
- Party: Democratic
- Spouse(s): Audrey Cheatham (m. 1932) Geneva Yelverton (m. 1960)
- Education: North Georgia College (BS)

Walter Coats Givhan (May 7, 1902 – February 18, 1976) was an American politician. An unrepentant white supremacist, he served in both houses of the Alabama Legislature, where he was a strong proponent of racial segregation. He was a Democrat and a Methodist.

He was a member of the state sponsored Alabama State Sovereignty Commission, a state government organization created to fight the federal government mandated integration in schools after Brown v. Board of Education (1954).

== Electoral history ==
Alabama Senate election results (1954–1976)
Election	Winner			Runners-up					
District 29 (1973–1973)
1974 gen	Walter C. Givhan (D)	15,070	69.90%	Amelia B. Robinson (NDPA)	6,483	30.07%	Haywood F. Stokes (WI)	7	0.03%
1974 prim	Walter C. Givhan (D)	16,988	57.83	J. L. Chestnut (D)	12,390	42.17%	—		
District 14 (1965–1973)
1970 gen	Walter C. Givhan (D)	Unk.	100.00%	—			—		
1970 prim ro	Walter C. Givhan (D)	14,560	65.56%	L. L. Anderson (D)	7,650	34.44%	—		
1970 prim	Walter C. Givhan (D)	6,865	44.22%	L. L. Anderson (D)	4,820	31.05%	Carl C. Morgan (D)	3,839	24.73%
1966 gen	Walter C. Givhan (D)	18,847	100.00%	—			—		
1966 prim	Walter C. Givhan (D)	16,534	69.17%	Dave Ellwanger (D)	7,371	30.83%	—		
District 30 (1901–1965)
1962 gen	Walter C. Givhan (D)	4,599	100.00%	—			—		
1962 sp prim	Walter C. Givhan (D)	Unopp.		—			—		
1962 prim	Walter C. Givhan (D)	Unopp.		—			—		
1958 gen	Walter C. Givhan (D)	2,353	100.00%	—			—		
1958 prim	Walter C. Givhan (D)	Unopp.		—			—		
1954 gen	Walter C. Givhan (D)	3,918	100.00%	—			—		
1954 prim	Walter C. Givhan (D)	Unopp.		—			—		

Alabama House of Representatives election results (1942–1950)
Election	Winner		
Dallas County, place 3
1950 gen	Walter C. Givhan (D)	1,860	100.00%
1950 prim	Walter C. Givhan (D)	Unopp.	
1946 gen	Walter C. Givhan (D)	1,989	100.00%
1946 prim	Walter C. Givhan (D)	3,727	100.00%
1942 gen	Walter C. Givhan (D)	777	100.00%
1942 prim	Walter C. Givhan (D)	3,315	100.00%

Alabama House of Representatives election results (1930)
Election	Candidate	Party	Votes	Pct.	Place
1930 gen	Walter C. Givhan	Democratic	?	?	Elected ? of 3
1930 prim	Walter C. Givhan	Democratic	1,912	20.81%	Nominated; 2nd of 6
