= 1974 Alabama gubernatorial election =

- November 5, 1974

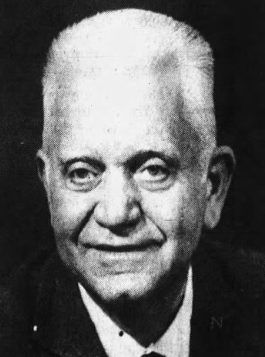
Nominee	George Wallace	Elvin McCary
Party	Democratic	Republican
Popular vote	497,574	88,381
Percentage	83.16%	14.77%
- County results Wallace: 60–70% 70–80% 80–90% >90%
Governor before election
George Wallace
Democratic
Elected Governor
George Wallace
Democratic

The 1974 Alabama gubernatorial election took place on November 5, 1974. Incumbent Democratic governor George Wallace was reelected in a landslide over his Republican opponent, businessman Elvin McCary. Wallace was the first Alabama governor to win election to a second consecutive term, as the state's Constitution was amended in 1968 to allow governors to serve a maximum two elected consecutive terms. This was also Wallace's first campaign after having been paralyzed following being shot by Arthur Bremer in an assassination attempt during Wallace's run for the 1972 Democratic presidential nomination.

As of 2022, this is the last time any gubernatorial candidate in Alabama won every county in the state.

== Democratic primary ==
Primary elections were held on May 7, 1974.

=== Candidates ===
- Jim Folsom, former governor
- Gene McLain, former state representative
- Shorty Price, perennial candidate
- Thomas Robinson
- George Wallace, incumbent governor

=== Results ===
Results by county: Wallace: 40–50%; 50–60%; 60–70%; 70–80%; 80–90%; McLain: 50–60%

Democratic primary results
Party	Candidate	Votes	%
Democratic	George Wallace (incumbent)	536,235	64.79
Democratic	Gene McLain	249,035	30.09
Democratic	Jim Folsom	24,821	3.00
Democratic	Shorty Price	9,834	1.19
Democratic	Thomas Robinson	7,726	0.93
Total votes		827,651	

== Republican primary ==
- Elvin McCary, former state senator from Calhoun County and businessman

== Results ==
1974 Alabama gubernatorial election
Party	Candidate	Votes	%
Democratic	George Wallace (incumbent)	497,574	83.16
Republican	Elvin McCary	88,381	14.77
Prohibition	Jim Partain	12,350	2.06
Total votes		598,305	100
Democratic hold			

== Bibliography ==
- Gubernatorial Elections, 1787-1997. Washington, D.C.: Congressional Quarterly Inc. 1998. ISBN 1-56802-396-0.
- Scammon, Richard M., ed. (1975). America Votes 11: a handbook of contemporary American election statistics, 1974. Washington, D.C.: Elections Research Center.
