= 1950 United States Senate election in Alabama =

- November 7, 1950
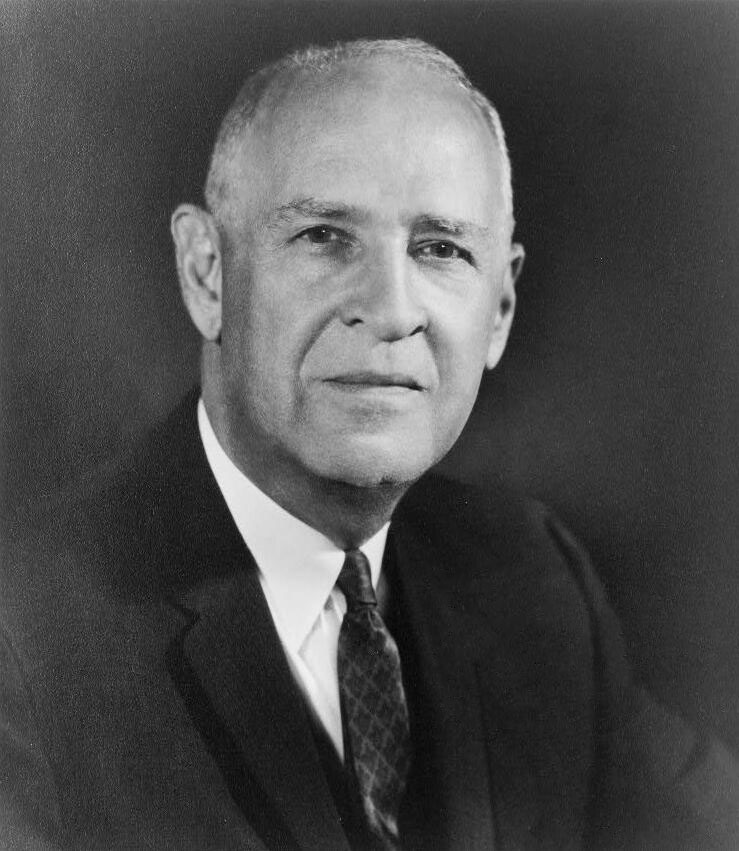

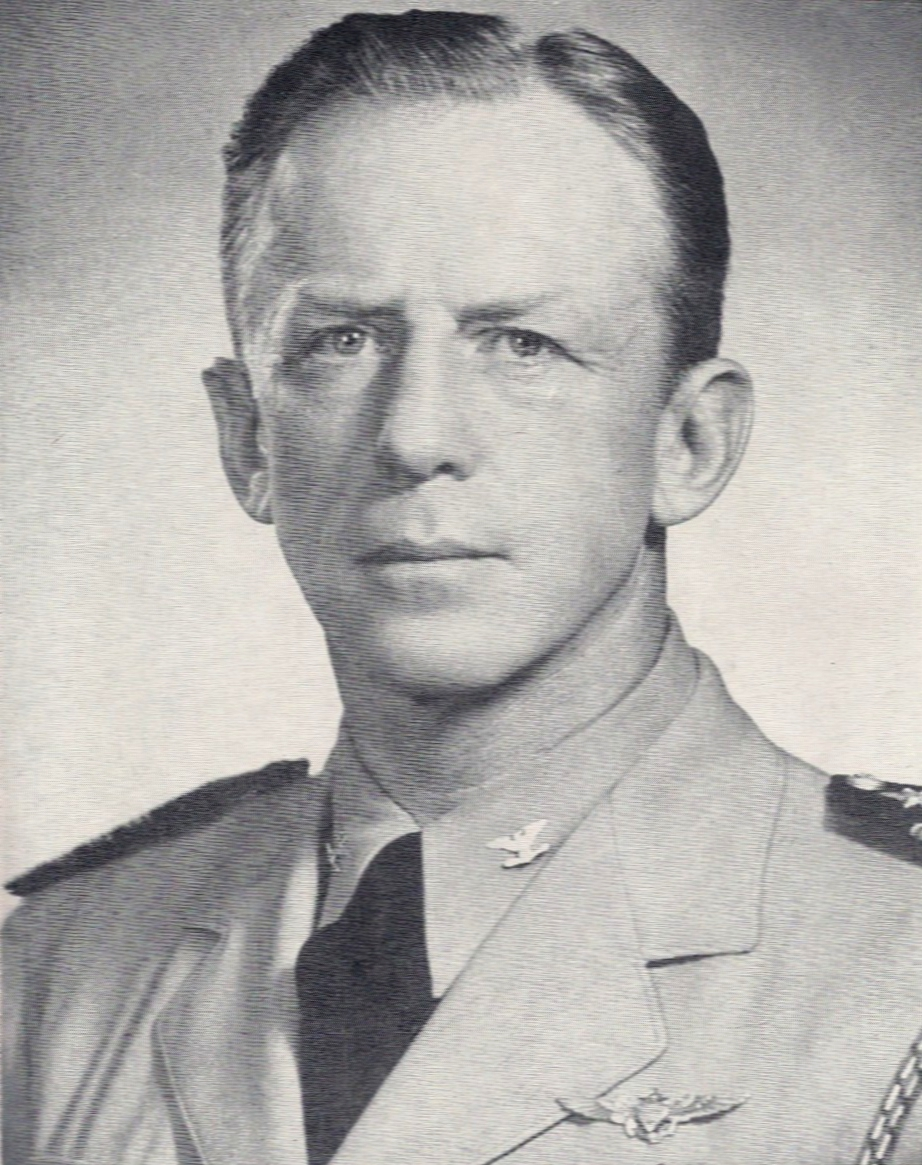
Nominee	Lister Hill	John G. Crommelin
Party	Democratic	Independent
Popular vote	125,534	38,477
Percentage	76.54%	23.46%
- County results Hill: 60–70% 70–80% 80–90% >90%
U.S. senator before election
J. Lister Hill
Democratic
Elected U.S. Senator
J. Lister Hill
Democratic

The 1950 United States Senate election in Alabama was held on Tuesday, November 7, to elect one United States Senator Democratic candidate incumbent Senator J. Lister Hill was re-elected for a third term in office, defeating retired United States Navy Rear Admiral John G. Crommelin, who ran as an independent candidate.

== General election ==
=== Candidates ===
- J. Lister Hill, incumbent Senator since 1938 (Democratic)
- John G. Crommelin, retired U.S. Navy rear admiral (Independent)

=== Results ===
1950 United States Senate election
Party	Candidate	Votes	%	±%
Democratic	J. Lister Hill (incumbent)	125,534	76.54%	▼5.24
Independent	John G. Crommelin	38,477	23.46%	N/A
Total votes		164,011	100.00%	
