= Bert Bank =

American politician

Bertram Bank (September 1, 1914 – June 22, 2009) was an American politician, war hero, and radio pioneer who was best known as the founder of the Alabama Football Radio Network. He was also the founder of two Tuscaloosa, Alabama, radio stations (WTBC and WUOA) and wrote the book, Back From the Living Dead, about his experiences as a POW and Bataan Death March survivor.

== Life and career ==
Bank was born in Montgomery, Alabama, to Sam and Bessie Bank. He earned a law degree from the University of Alabama in 1940. After graduating, he received a commission as a second lieutenant through the University's ROTC program and was assigned to the 27th Bomb Group. Bank served in the Pacific Theater during World War II. He was captured in 1942 and held as a POW by Japan while serving in the Philippines, surviving the Bataan Death March in the process. During his time as POW he was held at Camp O'Donnell (Cabanatuan) before being relocated to the island of Mindanao. He was back at Cabanatuan by the time of its liberation by US Rangers near the end of the war.

After the war, Bank retired from the Air Force with the rank of Major and returned to Tuscaloosa and took over WTBC as owner and general manager. He then secured the rights to broadcast Alabama Crimson Tide football in 1953 and built a network of affiliates that became the Alabama Football Radio Network.

Bank served as producer of the network until 1985 and held the title of producer emeritus of the AFRN and its successors until his death. He was known for watching games from the broadcast booth up to the 2008 season before his death, being acknowledged by Alabama Radio play by play commentator Eli Gold every broadcast. Bank was also a pioneer in broadcasting basketball, having his station become the first in the state to broadcast a game over the air.

Bank also served as a member of both the Alabama House of Representatives and Alabama Senate. He served two terms in the State House, first being elected in 1966, and one term as a State Senator, being elected in 1974 for the 30th district. He chose to forgo a second term in the State Senate to unsuccessfully run for Lieutenant Governor in 1978.

His most famous accomplishments while serving in the Alabama Legislature included the introduction of legislation that made it a felony to burn an American Flag or draft card, making Alabama the first state in the nation to address the issue, as well as legislation requiring the philosophy of patriotism to be taught in Alabama public schools.

== Death ==
Bank lived in Tuscaloosa until he died on June 22, 2009, aged 94, shortly after being admitted into a local hospital. He was survived by two sons and four grandchildren.

== Awards and honors ==
- Purple Heart
- Bronze Star
- Alabama Broadcasters Association Hall of Fame and Lifetime Achievement Award
- National Veterans Award
