= George C. Hawkins =

American lawyer and politician

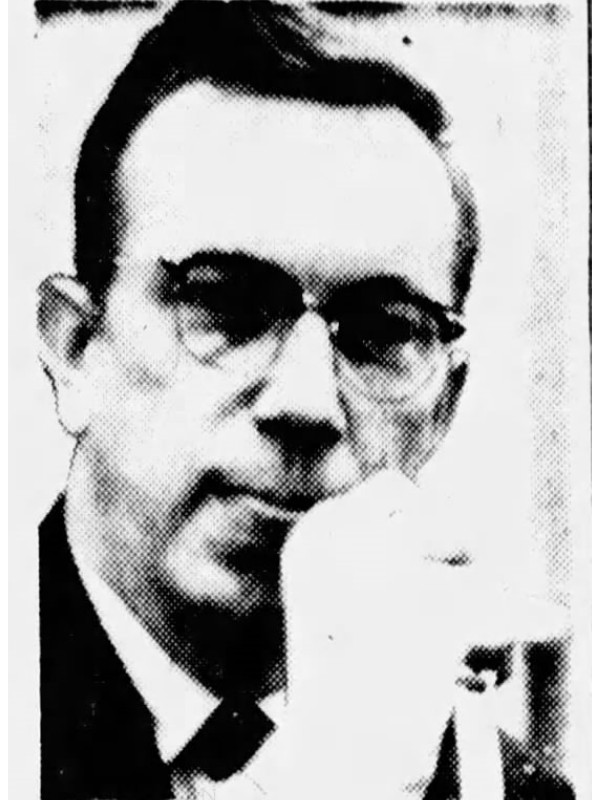

Member of the Alabama Senate from the 6th district
- In office 1963–1967

Member of the Alabama House of Representatives from Etowah County
- In office 1951–1959

Personal details
- Born: December 4, 1918 Elora, Tennessee, U.S.
- Died: August 9, 1991 (aged 72)
- Party: Democratic
- Spouse: Jane Elizabeth Smith (m. 1942) Jean Temple (m.1981-1991)
- Children: 5
- Occupation: Lawyer

George Copeland Hawkins Jr. (December 4, 1918 – August 9, 1991), was an Alabama lawyer and Democratic politician who served in the Alabama House of Representatives in the 1950s.

He attended the 1948 Democratic National Convention as an alternate delegate.

He died in 1991 of kidney failure and was buried in Forrest Cemetery in Gadsden.
