= 2021 Alabama elections =

Various special elections for the Alabama House of Representatives and Alabama Senate have been held in the U.S. state of Alabama on various dates in 2021.

== State elections ==
=== Legislative ===
==== House of Representatives 33rd district special election ====
===== Democratic candidates =====
The Democratic primary for Alabama's 33rd house district was cancelled. Fred Crum advanced to the general election by default

====== Withdrawn or disqualified candidates ======
- Terra Foster

===== Republican candidates =====
The Republican primary for Alabama's 33rd house district was cancelled. Ben Robbins advanced to the general election by default

====== Withdrawn or disqualified candidates ======
- Jimmy Reynolds Jr.

===== Results =====
2021 Alabama's 33rd state house district special election
Party	Candidate	Votes	%
Republican	Ben Robbins	2,232	68.19%
Democratic	Fred Crum	1,037	31.69%
Write-in		4	0.12%
Total votes		3,273	100.0%
Republican hold			

==== Senate 14th district special election ====
{{{title}}}
Party	Candidate	Votes	%
Republican	April Weaver	6,231	80.24%
Democratic	Virginia Applebaum	1,523	19.61%
Write-in		11	0.14%
Total votes			
Republican hold			

==== House of Representatives 73rd district special election ====
2021 House of Representatives 73rd district special election
Party	Candidate	Votes	%
Republican	Kenneth Paschal	2,743	74.7%
Democratic	Sheridan Black	920	25.1%
Write-in		9	0.2%
Total votes			
Republican hold			

==== House of Representatives 78th district special election ====
2021 Alabama House of Representatives 78th District special election
- August 7, 2021

Alabama's 78th state house district
- Registered: 26,790
- Turnout: 4.80%
Candidate	Kenyatté Hassell	Loretta Grant
Party	Democratic	Republican
Popular vote	1,028	254
Percentage	80.12%	19.80%
State representative before election
Kirk Hatcher
Democratic
Elected state representative
Kenyatté Hassell
Democratic

The 2021 Alabama's 78th state house district special election took place on September 7, 2021, to elect a member to the Alabama House of Representatives to fill the vacancy left by Kirk Hatcher, who was elected to the Alabama State Senate in a special election in March. Primaries took place on May 25, 2021. The election was won by Democrat Kenyatté Hassell, who defeated Republican Loretta Grant with over 80% of the vote.

On March 8, 2021, Alabama governor Kay Ivey set a special election date and candidate filing deadlines for the 78th state house district.

Alabama's 78th state house district is situated within Montgomery County, Alabama and represents south, west, and north Montgomery, Alabama.

The 78th state house district is considered a Democratic stronghold, having voting for Democratic candidates by wide margins in recent elections, and with no Republican candidate appearing on the ballot in the 2018 election.

===== Democratic candidates =====
====== Nominee ======
- Kenyatté Hassell, urban director for Young Life

====== Eliminated in primary runoff ======
- Donald Williams, retired human resources consultant

====== Eliminated in primary ======
- Terance Dawson
- Roderick Thornton

===== Republican candidates =====
The Republican primary for Alabama's 78th house district was cancelled. Loretta Grant advanced to the general election by default.

===== Results =====
Primary results by precinct Hassell: Hassell: 40–50% Hassell: 50–60% Hassell: 60–70%; Williams: Williams: 40–50% Williams: 60–70% Williams: >90%; Dawson: Dawson: 30–40%; Thornton: Thornton: 30–40%; Tie: Tie: 37.5%; Data not available: Data not available

2021 Alabama's 78th state house district special election democratic primary
Party	Candidate	Votes	%
Democratic	Kenyatté Hassell	554	48.13
Democratic	Donald Williams	265	23.02
Democratic	Terance Dawson	218	18.94
Democratic	Roderick Thornton	114	9.90
Total votes		1,151	100.0%

Runoff results by precinct Hassell: Hassell: 50–60% Hassell: 60–70% Hassell: 70–80%; Williams: Williams: 50–60% Williams: >90%; Data not available: Data not available

2021 Alabama's 78th state house district special election democratic primary runoff
Party	Candidate	Votes	%
Democratic	Kenyatté Hassell	678	64.82
Democratic	Donald Williams	368	35.18
Total votes		1,046	100.0%

2021 Alabama's 78th state house district special election
Party	Candidate	Votes	%
Democratic	Kenyatté Hassell	1,028	80.12%
Republican	Loretta Grant	254	19.8%
Write-in		1	0.08%
Total votes		1,283	100.0%
Democratic hold			
