= Janie Shores =

American judge

Janie Ledlow Shores
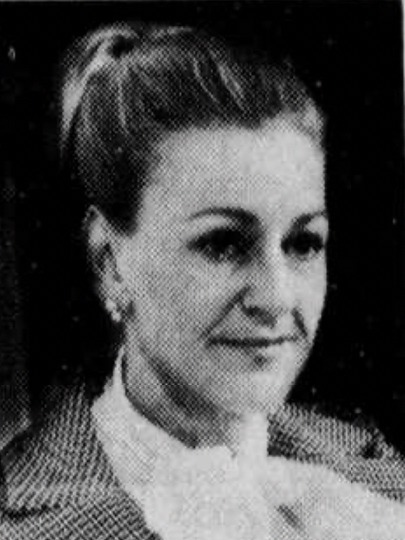
- Shores in 1974

Associate Justice of the Alabama Supreme Court
- In office 1974–1999
- Preceded by: James S. Coleman

Personal details
- Born: Janie Lee Ledlow; April 30, 1932 Butler County, Alabama, U.S.
- Died: August 9, 2017 (aged 85)
- Party: Democratic
- Education: Judson College; Samford University (BA); University of Alabama (JD); University of Virginia (LLM)
- Occupation: judge law professor

Janie Ledlow Shores (April 30, 1932 – August 9, 2017) was a judge on the Supreme Court of Alabama who was the first woman to ever serve on that court. Shores also was considered by President Bill Clinton in 1993 as a possible nominee to the United States Supreme Court.

== Early life and education ==
A native of Butler County, Alabama, who grew up in Baldwin County, Alabama, Shores attended Judson College and earned a bachelor's degree from Samford University. She then graduated with honors with a Juris Doctor degree from the University of Alabama Law School in 1959. Shores earned an LLM degree from the University of Virginia in 1992.

== Career ==
After graduating law school, Shores practiced law in Selma, Alabama, and also worked on the legal staff of the Liberty National Life Insurance Company from 1961 until 1965. In 1965, Shores became the first full-time female law faculty member in Alabama (and the second in the entire Southeast) when she was hired as a law professor at Cumberland School of Law in Birmingham, Alabama.

=== Tenure on the Supreme Court of Alabama ===
In 1974, Shores ran for and won a seat on the Supreme Court of Alabama as a Democrat, winning the primary and running unopposed in the general election, becoming the first woman ever to be elected to that court. "I hope it has now been demonstrated that women can hold these positions and can be elected in Alabama, and I hope I have had some small part in letting women know to do that is possible," Shores told the Birmingham News in an article that was published on March 29, 1995.

=== Consideration for nomination to the U.S. Supreme Court ===
In 1993, shortly after U.S. Supreme Court Associate Justice Byron White announced his resignation, President Clinton was stymied when his top choice, New York's then-Gov. Mario Cuomo, told him he was not interested. Clinton subsequently asked his staff to expand the search. On May 6, 1993, the Washington Post named Shores as a possible choice for Clinton, particularly since she had served on the Supreme Court of Alabama for four years in the 1970s with then-U.S. Sen. Howell Heflin, who by 1993 was a member of the U.S. Senate Judiciary Committee. On May 15, 1993, the Birmingham News reported that Heflin had said that the White House was giving "careful consideration" to Shores as a nominee. At a dinner a few weeks earlier, Heflin said that White House Counselor Bernard Nussbaum had "asked me about Janie," the paper reported.

In Jeffrey Toobin's 2007 book The Nine: Inside the Secret World of the Supreme Court, President Clinton is reported to have pulled Shores's name from a list and wondered whether she might make an appropriate Supreme Court nominee. Toobin notes that Shores was "utterly unknown in Washington legal circles and no one – not Clinton or anyone on his staff – had any idea where she stood on constitutional issues or much of anything else." Ultimately, Nussbaum is reported by Toobin to have become "increasingly embarrassed as the names came and went," and "decided to make a stand." Toobin reports that Nussbaum told Clinton, "You are not nominating Janie Shores to the Supreme Court. No one knows who she is. This is insane." Toobin notes that Clinton ultimately relented, and later wound up appointing Ruth Bader Ginsburg to the High Court. For Shores's part, she has said that she was very honored to have even been considered. "It was a great honor to be considered even though I didn't get it," Shores told the Birmingham News in an article that ran on March 29, 1995.

Clinton clearly held some respect for Shores, however. Less than two years later, in January 1995, Clinton appointed Shores to the State Justice Institute, a private, nonprofit entity that provides financial support to projects aimed at improving the administration and quality of state courts.

== Retirement ==
Shores chose not to run for re-election in 1998. This meant that her final day on the bench was in January 1999.

Shores served as a supernumerary justice until 2001, when Roy Moore, then the Chief Justice of the Supreme Court of Alabama, dismissed her and replaced her with retired Justice Hugh Maddox.

In 2004, Shores served as one of seven members of a special State Supreme Court that considered the appeal of the ouster of Moore as chief justice. The court was chosen at random from a group of retired but still active judges. On April 30, 2004, the panel voted 7–0 not to reinstate Moore.

Shores lived in Fairhope, Alabama.

== Death ==
She died on August 9, 2017, at the age of 85 after suffering a stroke.

== See also ==
- List of female state supreme court justices

== Bibliography ==
- Toobin, Jeffrey, The Nine: Inside the Secret World of the Supreme Court, Doubleday, New York, 2007, p. 67.
