= Elvin McCary =

American politician

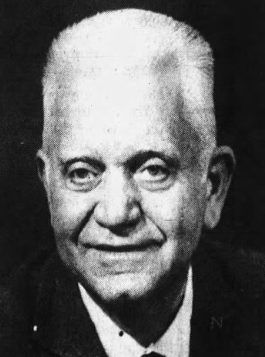
- McCary in 1974

Member of the Alabama Senate
- In office 1942–1946
- In office 1951–1955

Personal details
- Born: Elvin Columbus McCary; February 27, 1907 Anniston, Alabama, U.S.
- Died: September 28, 1981 (aged 74) Anniston, Alabama, U.S.
- Party: Democratic; Republican
- Education: Jacksonville State Teachers College; New York University

Elvin Columbus McCary (February 27, 1907 – September 28, 1981) was an American politician. A member of the Democratic Party and the Republican Party, he served in the Alabama Senate from 1942 to 1946 and again from 1951 to 1955.

== Life and career ==
McCary was born in Anniston, Alabama, the son of Cicero Columbus McCary and Annie Mae Power. He attended Jacksonville State Teachers College, graduating in 1925. After graduating, he attended New York University, earning his bachelor's degree in 1933, which after earning his degree, he worked as a real estate agent.

McCary served in the Alabama Senate from 1942 to 1946. He lost his seat in the Senate, in 1946, when he ran as a Democratic candidate for lieutenant governor of Alabama. He received 9,164 votes, but lost in the Democratic primary election to candidate James C. Inzer, who won with 23,537 votes, which after his losing in the lieutenant gubernatorial election, he served again in the Senate from 1951 to 1955.

In 1974, McCary ran as a Republican candidate for governor of Alabama. He received 88,391 votes, but lost to Democratic incumbent George Wallace, who won with 497,574 votes.

== Death ==
McCary died on September 28, 1981, at the Northeast Alabama Regional Medical Center in Anniston, Alabama, at the age of 74.
