= James S. Coleman (judge) =

American judge (1906-1987)

James S. Coleman Jr. (June 8, 1906 – August 24, 1987) was a justice of the Supreme Court of Alabama from 1957 to 1975.

Coleman was the grandson of Thomas W. Coleman, who also served as a justice of the Supreme Court of Alabama.

Coleman received his undergraduate degree from the United States Naval Academy in 1927, attended the University of Alabama School of Law, and gained admission to the bar in 1934.

He was elected to a six-year term on the state supreme court in 1956, and won re-election in 1962 and 1968. He chose not to run for re-election in 1974.

Coleman died at the age of 81, following a lengthy illness.

Political offices
Preceded by Norman T. Spann	Justice of the Supreme Court of Alabama; 1957–1975	Succeeded by Janie Shores
