= Electoral history of George Wallace =

List of elections featuring George Wallace as a candidate

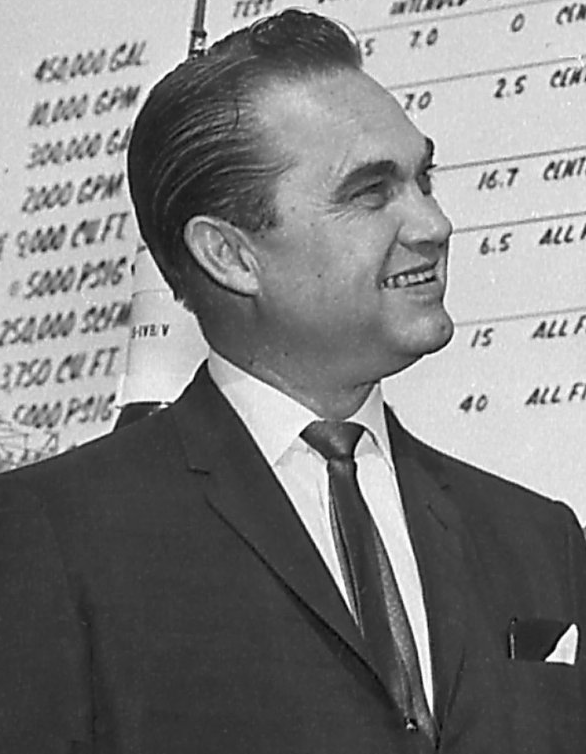
Governor George Wallace (D-AL)

Electoral history of George Wallace, 45th governor of Alabama (1963–1967, 1971–1979, 1983–1987), 1968 American Independent Party presidential nominee and candidate for 1964, 1972 and 1976 Democratic Party presidential nomination

Alabama House of Representatives, 1946, Barbour County, Second Representative
Party	Candidate	Votes	%
Democratic	George Wallace	1,526	100%

Governor of Alabama, 1958, Democratic primary
Party	Candidate	Votes	%
Democratic	John M. Patterson	196,859	31.8%
Democratic	George Wallace	162,435	26.3%
Democratic	Jimmy Faulkner	91,512	14.8%
Democratic	A. W. Todd	59,240	9.6%
Democratic	Laurie C. Battle	38,955	6.3%
Democratic	George Hawkins	24,332	3.9%
None	Others	45,349	

Governor of Alabama, 1958, Democratic primary runoff
Party	Candidate	Votes	%
Democratic	John M. Patterson	315,353	55.7%
Democratic	George Wallace	250,451	44.3%

Governor of Alabama, 1962, Democratic primary
Party	Candidate	Votes	%
Democratic	George Wallace	207,062	32.5%
Democratic	Ryan DeGraffenried Sr.	160,704	25.2%
Democratic	Jim Folsom	159,640	25.1%
Democratic	MacDonald Gallion	80,374	12.6%
Democratic	Bull Connor	23,019	3.6%
Democratic	J. Bruce Henderson	3,666	0.6%
Democratic	Wayne Jennings	1,946	0.31
Democratic	Albert Boutwell	862	0.1

Governor of Alabama, 1962, Democratic primary runoff
Party	Candidate	Votes	%
Democratic	George Wallace	340,730	55.9%
Democratic	Ryan DeGraffenried Sr.	269,122	44.1%

Governor of Alabama, 1962
Party	Candidate	Votes	%
Democratic	George Wallace	303,987	96.27%
Independent	Frank P. Walls	11,789	3.7%

1964 California Democratic Party presidential primary:

- Pat Brown – 1,693,813 (27.26%)
- Lyndon B. Johnson (inc.) – 1,106,999 (17.82%)
- Sam Yorty – 798,431 (12.85%)
- George Wallace – 672,984 (10.83%)
- John W. Reynolds – 522,405 (8.41%)
- Albert S. Porter – 493,619 (7.94%)
- Matthew E. Welsch – 376,023 (6.05%)
- Daniel Brewster – 267,106 (4.30%)
- Jennings Randolph – 131,432 (2.12%)
- Unpledged delegates – 81,614 (1.31%)
- Robert F. Kennedy – 36,258 (0.58%)

Total primaries popular vote

1968 Democratic presidential primaries:

- Eugene McCarthy – 2,914,933 (38.73%)
- Robert F. Kennedy – 2,305,148 (30.63%)
- Stephen M. Young – 549,140 (7.30%)
- Lyndon B. Johnson (inc.) – 383,590 (5.10%)
- Thomas C. Lynch – 380,286 (5.05%)
- Roger D. Branigin – 238,700 (3.17%)
- George Smathers – 236,242 (3.14%)
- Hubert Humphrey – 166,463 (2.21%)
- Unpledged delegates – 161,143 (2.14%)
- Scott Kelly – 128,899 (1.71%)
- George Wallace – 34,489 (0.46%)

1968 Democratic National Convention (presidential tally):

- Hubert Humphrey – 1,760 (67.43%)
- Eugene McCarthy – 601 (23.03%)
- George McGovern – 147 (5.63%)
- Channing E. Phillips – 68 (2.61%)
- Daniel K. Moore – 18 (0.69%)
- Ted Kennedy – 13 (0.50%)
- Paul Bryant – 1 (0.04%)
- James H. Gray – 1 (0.04%)
- George Wallace – 1 (0.04%)

1968 United States presidential election
Party	Candidate	Votes	%
Republican	Richard Nixon/ Spiro Agnew	31,783,783	43.4%
Democratic	Hubert Humphrey/Edmund Muskie	31,271,839	42.7%
American Independent	George Wallace/Curtis LeMay	9,901,118	13.5%
Independent	Eugene McCarthy	25,634	0%
None	Others	243,258	0.3%

Governor of Alabama, 1970, Democratic primary
Party	Candidate	Votes	%
Democratic	Albert Brewer (incumbent)	428,146	42.0%
Democratic	George Wallace	416,443	40.8%
Democratic	Charles Woods	149,987	14.7%
Democratic	Asa Carter	15,441	1.5%
Democratic	Jim Folsom	4,123	0.4%
Democratic	Coleman Brown	2,836	0.3%
Democratic	Ralph "Shorty" Price	2,804	0.3%

Governor of Alabama, 1970, Democratic primary runoff
Party	Candidate	Votes	%
Democratic	George Wallace	559,832	51.6%
Democratic	Albert Brewer (incumbent)	525,951	48.4%

Governor of Alabama, 1970
Party	Candidate	Votes	%
Democratic	George Wallace	637,046	74.5%
NDPA	John Cashin	125,491	14.7%
Independent	A.C. Walker	75,679	8.9%
Prohibition	Jerome B. Couch	9,705	1.14%
Independent	Menter G. Walker	3,534	0.4%
Whig	John Watts	3,497	0.4%

Total primaries popular vote

1972 Democratic Party presidential primaries:

- Hubert Humphrey – 4,121,372 (25.77%)
- George McGovern – 4,053,451 (25.34%)
- George Wallace – 3,755,424 (23.48%)
- Edmund Muskie – 1,840,217 (11.51%)
- Eugene McCarthy – 553,990 (3.46%)
- Henry M. Jackson – 505,198 (3.16%)
- Shirley Chisholm – 430,703 (2.69%)
- Terry Sanford – 331,415 (2.07%)
- John V. Lindsay – 196,406 (1.23%)
- Sam Yorty – 79,446 (0.50%)
- Wilbur Mills – 37,401 (0.23%)
- Walter Fauntroy – 21,217 (0.13%)
- Unpledged delegates – 19,533 (0.12%)
- Ted Kennedy – 16,693 (0.10%)
- Vance Hartke – 11,798 (0.07%)
- Patsy Mink – 8,286 (0.05%)

1972 Democratic National Convention (presidential tally):

- George McGovern – 1,729 (57.37%)
- Henry M. Jackson – 525 (17.42%)
- George Wallace – 382 (12.67%)
- Shirley Chisholm – 152 (5.04%)
- Terry Sanford – 78 (2.59%)
- Hubert Humphrey – 67 (2.22%)
- Wilbur Mills – 34 (1.13%)
- Edmund Muskie – 25 (0.83%)
- Ted Kennedy – 13 (0.43%)
- Wayne L. Hays – 5 (0.17%)
- Eugene McCarthy – 2 (0.07%)
- Ramsey Clark – 1 (0.03%)
- Walter Mondale – 1 (0.03%)

1972 Democratic National Convention (vice presidential tally):

- Thomas Eagleton – 1,742 (59.07%)
- Frances Farenthold – 405 (13.73%)
- Mike Gravel – 226 (7.66%)
- Endicott Peabody – 108 (3.66%)
- Clay Smothers – 74 (2.51%)
- Birch Bayh – 62 (2.10%)
- Peter Rodino – 57 (1.93%)
- Jimmy Carter – 30 (1.02%)
- Shirley Chisholm – 20 (0.68%)
- Moon Landrieu – 19 (0.64%)
- Edward T. Breathitt – 18 (0.61%)
- Ted Kennedy – 15 (0.51%)
- Fred R. Harris – 14 (0.48%)
- Richard G. Hatcher – 11 (0.37%)
- Harold E. Hughes – 10 (0.34%)
- Joseph M. Montoya – 9 (0.31%)
- William L. Guy – 8 (0.27%)
- Adlai Stevenson III – 8 (0.27%)
- Robert Bergland – 5 (0.17%)
- Hodding Carter – 5 (0.17%)
- Cesar Chavez – 5 (0.17%)
- Wilbur Mills – 5 (0.17%)
- Wendell Anderson – 4 (0.14%)
- Stanley Arnold – 4 (0.14%)
- Ron Dellums – 4 (0.14%)
- John J. Houlihan – 4 (0.14%)
- Roberto A. Mondragon – 4 (0.14%)
- Reubin O'Donovan Askew – 3 (0.10%)
- Herman Badillo – 3 (0.10%)
- Eugene McCarthy – 3 (0.10%)
- Claiborne Pell – 3 (0.10%)
- Terry Sanford – 3 (0.10%)
- Ramsey Clark – 2 (0.07%)
- Richard J. Daley – 2 (0.07%)
- John DeCarlo – 2 (0.07%)
- Ernest Gruening – 2 (0.07%)
- Roger Mudd – 2 (0.07%)
- Edmund Muskie – 2 (0.07%)
- Claude Pepper – 2 (0.07%)
- Abraham Ribicoff – 2 (0.07%)
- Pat Taylor – 2 (0.07%)
- Leonard F. Woodcock – 2 (0.07%)
- Bruno Agnoli – 2 (0.07%)
- Ernest Albright – 1 (0.03%)
- William A. Barrett – 1 (0.03%)
- Daniel Berrigan – 1 (0.03%)
- Phillip Berrigan – 1 (0.03%)
- Julian Bond – 1 (0.03%)
- Hargrove Bowles – 1 (0.03%)
- Archibald Burton – 1 (0.03%)
- Phillip Burton – 1 (0.03%)
- William Chappell – 1 (0.03%)
- Lawton Chiles – 1 (0.03%)
- Frank Church – 1 (0.03%)
- Robert Drinan – 1 (0.03%)
- Nick Galifianakis – 1 (0.03%)
- John Goodrich – 1 (0.03%)
- Michael Griffin – 1 (0.03%)
- Martha Griffiths – 1 (0.03%)
- Charles Hamilton – 1 (0.03%)
- Patricia Harris – 1 (0.03%)
- Jim Hunt – 1 (0.03%)
- Daniel Inouye – 1 (0.03%)
- Henry M. Jackson – 1 (0.03%)
- Robery Kariss – 1 (0.03%)
- Allard K. Lowenstein – 1 (0.03%)
- Mao Zedong – 1 (0.03%)
- Eleanor McGovern – 1 (0.03%)
- Martha Mitchell – 1 (0.03%)
- Ralph Nader – 1 (0.03%)
- George Norcross – 1 (0.03%)
- Jerry Rubin – 1 (0.03%)
- Fred Seaman – 1 (0.03%)
- Joe Smith – 1 (0.03%)
- Benjamin Spock – 1 (0.03%)
- Patrick Tavolacci – 1 (0.03%)
- George Wallace – 1 (0.03%)

American Independent Party National Convention, 1972 (presidential tally):

- John G. Schmitz – 330 (71.74%)
- George L. Garfield – 56 (12.17%)
- Allen Grear – 26 (5.65%)
- Thomas J. Anderson – 24 (5.22%)
- Richard B. Kay – 16 (3.48%)
- George Wallace – 8 (1.74%)

Governor of Alabama, 1974, Democratic primary
Party	Candidate	Votes	%
Democratic	George Wallace (incumbent)	536,235	64.8%
Democratic	Gene McLain	249,035	30.1%
Democratic	Jim Folsom	24,821	3%
Democratic	Ralph "Shorty" Price	9,834	1.19%
Democratic	Thomas Robinson	7,726	0.9%

Governor of Alabama, 1974
Party	Candidate	Votes	%
Democratic	George Wallace (incumbent)	497,574	83.2%
Republican	Elvin McCary	88,381	14.8%
Prohibition	Jim Partain	12,350	2.1%

1976 Democratic presidential primaries:

- Jimmy Carter – 6,235,609 (39.19%)
- Jerry Brown – 2,449,374 (15.39%)
- George Wallace – 1,955,388 (12.29%)
- Mo Udall – 1,611,754 (10.13%)
- Henry M. Jackson – 1,134,375 (7.13%)
- Frank Church – 830,818 (5.22%)
- Robert Byrd – 340,309 (2.14%)
- Sargent Shriver – 304,399 (1.91%)
- Unpledged delegates – 283,437 (1.78%)
- Ellen McCormack – 238,027 (1.50%)
- Fred R. Harris – 234,568 (1.47%)
- Milton Shapp – 88,254 (0.56%)
- Birch Bayh – 86,438 (0.54%)
- Hubert Humphrey – 61,992 (0.39%)
- Ted Kennedy – 19,805 (0.12%)
- Arthur O. Blessitt – 8,717 (0.06%)
- Lloyd Bentsen – 4,046 (0.03%)

1976 Democratic National Convention (presidential tally):

- Jimmy Carter – 2,239 (74.48%)
- Mo Udall – 330 (10.98%)
- Jerry Brown – 301 (10.01%)
- George Wallace – 57 (1.90%)
- Ellen McCormack – 22 (0.73%)
- Frank Church – 19 (0.63%)
- Hubert Humphrey – 10 (0.33%)
- Henry M. Jackson – 10 (0.33%)
- Fred R. Harris – 9 (0.30%)
- Milton Shapp – 2 (0.07%)
- Robert Byrd – 1 (0.03%)
- Cesar Chavez – 1 (0.03%)
- Leon Jaworski – 1 (0.03%)
- Barbara Jordan – 1 (0.03%)
- Ted Kennedy – 1 (0.03%)
- Jennings Randolph – 1 (0.03%)
- Fred Stover – 1 (0.03%)

1976 Democratic National Convention (vice presidential tally):

- Walter Mondale – 2,817 (94.28%)
- Carl Albert – 36 (1.21%)
- Barbara Jordan – 25 (0.84%)
- Ron Dellums – 20 (0.67%)
- Henry M. Jackson – 16 (0.54%)
- Gary Benoit – 12 (0.40%)
- Frank Church – 11 (0.37%)
- Fritz Efaw – 11 (0.37%)
- Peter Flaherty – 11 (0.37%)
- George Wallace – 6 (0.20%)
- Allard Lowenstein – 5 (0.17%)
- Edmund Muskie – 4 (0.13%)
- Philip Hart – 2 (0.07%)
- Thomas E. Morgan – 2 (0.07%)
- Mo Udall – 2 (0.07%)
- Wendell Anderson – 1 (0.03%)
- Al Castro – 1 (0.03%)
- Fred R. Harris – 1 (0.03%)
- Ernest Hollings – 1 (0.03%)
- Peter Rodino – 1 (0.03%)
- Daniel Schorr – 1 (0.03%)
- Josephnie Smith – 1 (0.03%)
- Hunter S. Thompson – 1 (0.03%)

Democratic primary for Governor of Alabama, 1982:

- George Wallace – 425,469 (42.53%)
- George McMillan – 296,271 (29.62%)
- Joe McCorquodale – 250,614 (25.05%)
- Jim Folsom – 17,333 (1.73%)
- Reuben McKinley – 10,617 (1.06%)

Democratic primary for Governor of Alabama runoff, 1982:

- George Wallace – 512,203 (51.19%)
- George McMillan – 488,444 (48.81%)

1982 Alabama gubernatorial election:

- George Wallace (D) – 650,538 (57.64%)
- Emory M. Folmar (R) – 440,815 (39.06%)
- Leo Suiter (Alabama Conservative) – 17,936 (1.59%)
- Henry Klingler (LBT) – 7,671 (0.68%)
- John Jackson (Alabama National Democrat) – 4,693 (0.42%)
- John Dyer (Prohibition) – 4,364 (0.39%)
- Martin J. Boyers (Socialist Workers) – 2,578 (0.23%)

== Gallery ==
United States presidential election, 1968

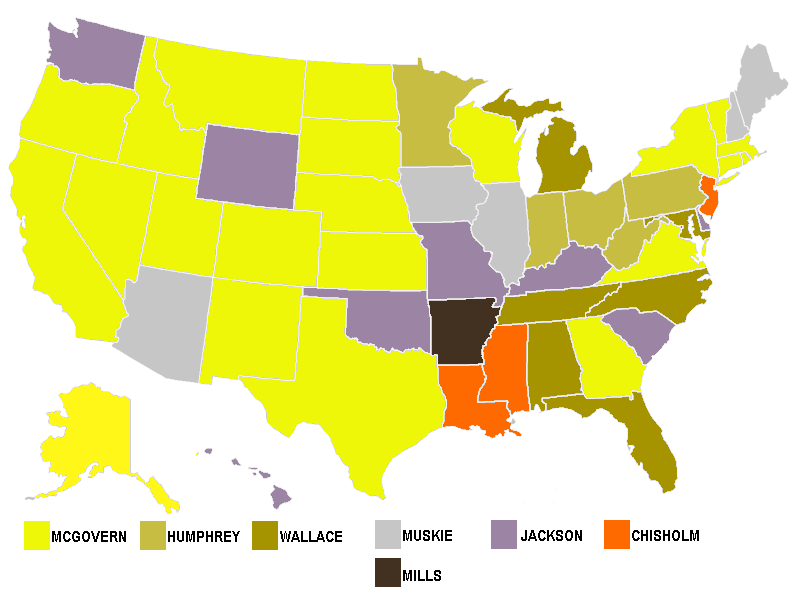
1972 Democratic presidential primaries

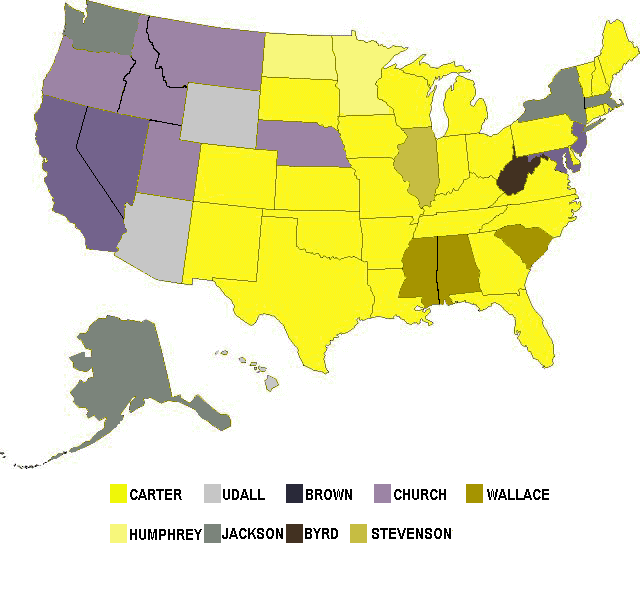
1976 Democratic presidential primaries
