= City Stages =

Arts and music festival in Alabama, US

Coordinates: 33°31′14″N 86°48′35″W

- Israel & New Breed performing at 2008 City Stages, Linn Park.
- Dates: Mid-June
- Locations: Birmingham, Alabama, US
- Years active: 1989–2009
- Founders: George McMillan
- Website: Official website

City Stages was a three-day arts and music festival in downtown Birmingham, Alabama, that took place in and around Linn Park from 1989 to 2009. After losses in 2009 amounted to nearly half a million dollars, the organization running City Stages announced on June 25, 2009 that the event would not return the next year.

City Stages' organizers announced in November 2007 that they hired AC Entertainment, one of the co-producers for the Bonnaroo Music and Arts Festival in Manchester, Tennessee, to help produce the Birmingham festival and advise them for the next three years.

The final City Stages was held on June 13–15, 2009, on Father's Day Weekend. Ticket sales were hampered by inclement weather, a struggling economy, and a perceived low-quality artist lineup. After the event, organizers announced that the total debt had surpassed $1 million, and that no further City Stages events would be produced. As of 2021, no plans have been made to revive the festival, though the nostalgia for it has grown.
