= Joe McCorquodale =

American politician (1920–2017)

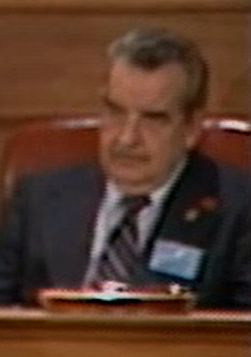

61st Speaker of the Alabama House of Representatives
- In office 1975–1983
- Preceded by: G. Sage Lyons
- Succeeded by: Tom Drake

Member of the Alabama House of Representatives from the 92nd district
- In office 1959–1983

Personal details
- Born: Joseph Charles McCorquodale, Jr. December 2, 1920 Mobile, Alabama, U.S.
- Died: April 17, 2017 (aged 96) Jackson, Alabama, U.S.
- Party: Democratic
- Spouse: Betty McCrary
- Children: two sons
- Education: University of Alabama
- Profession: businessman

Joseph Charles McCorquodale, Jr. (December 2, 1920 – April 17, 2017) was a United States politician from Alabama, who served as the Speaker of the Alabama House of Representatives and unsuccessfully ran for Governor on the basis of the "McCorquodale plan" for Alabama. He was a member of Democratic Party. He was born in Mobile, Alabama.

A native of Clarke County, he graduated from Marion Military Institute, and the University of Alabama. During World War II he served in the United States Army Air Forces in the China-Burma-India and Pacific Theaters.

He was elected to the Alabama House of Representatives in 1959 (92nd district). He served on the Interim Committee, on Finance and Taxation, the Fiscal Advisory Committee to the Governor, the Legislative Council, as vice-chairman of the Legislative Committee on Public Accounts, as co-chairman Alabama Constitutional Commission, the Coosa Valley, Tombigbee Valley and Tennessee-Tombigbee Waterway Development Authorities, the Alabama Historical Commission, and the Study Commission on Alabama's Judicial System.

McCorquodale was honored by Capitol Press Corps as the Hardest Working Member of the House (1967) and Outstanding Member of the House (1971.

He served as a Speaker from 1971 to 1983.

He sought Democratic nomination for Governor of Alabama in 1982. His main opponent were former Governor George Wallace and incumbent Lieutenant Governor George McMillan. McCorquodale finished third with 250,614 (25.05%) of votes. Wallace defeated McMillan in runoff and won the general election easily.

He decided to not seek re-election in 1982 in order to concentrate of his gubernatorial Bid. He was succeeded by fellow Democrat Harrell Blakeney.

He was an owner of McCorquodale Insurance Agency, is president of Overstreet and McCorquodale Forest Products, Inc., and chairman of the Board of the Washington County State Bank.

He was also church school superintendent and chairman of the Official Board of the First United Methodist Church in Jackson.

He was married to the former Betty McCrary and is the father of two sons, Joseph, III, and Gaines C. McCorquodale, and the grandfather of four. He died on 17 April 2017 at the age of 96.

== Electoral history (incomplete) ==
State House, 92nd district

- Joe McCorquodale (D), (inc.) - 4,967 (100.00%)

Democratic primaries for Governor, 1982

- George Wallace - 425,469 (42.53%)
- George McMillan - 296,271 (29.62%)
- Joe McCorquodale - 250,614 (25.05%)
- Jim Folsom - 17,333 (1.73%)
- Reuben McKinley - 10,617 (1.06%)

== See also ==
Alabama gubernatorial election, 1982
