= Edward deGraffenried =

American politician

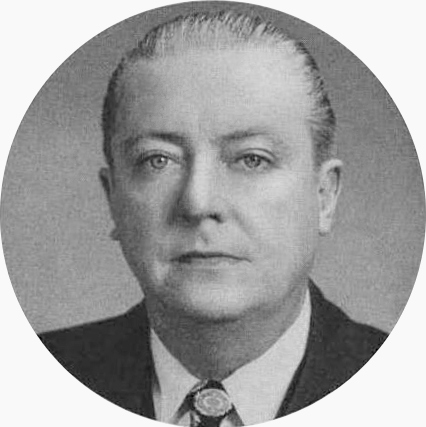

Member of the U.S. House of Representatives from Alabama's 6th district
- In office January 3, 1949 – January 3, 1953
- Preceded by: Pete Jarman
- Succeeded by: Armistead I. Selden Jr.

Personal details
- Born: June 30, 1899 Eutaw, Alabama
- Died: November 5, 1974 (aged 75) Tuscaloosa, Alabama
- Party: Democratic
- Spouse: Grace Ryan
- Children: Edward III, Jeff B., William Ryan, Christopher, and Grace
- Education: University of Alabama
- Occupation: lawyer

Edward Wadsworth deGraffenried Jr. (June 30, 1899 – November 5, 1974) was a U.S. representative from Alabama.

== Life and career ==
Born in Eutaw, Alabama on June 30, 1899, Edward deGraffenried was the second direct male descendant of Baron Christoph de Graffenried, the founder of New Bern, North Carolina, to be elected to Congress. Mr. Ed, as he was known, was the son of Edward deGraffenried (1861–1922), who was at one time a Judge of Court of Appeals of Alabama, and prior to that, having a distinguished law practice throughout Alabama, a member of the Constitutional Convention of 1901, legal adviser to the Governor of Alabama (1910), a noted orator and author. The Congressman was raised in Greensboro, Alabama and attended local public schools, afterwards he graduated from Gulf Coast Military Academy, Gulfport, Mississippi, in 1917. There he was the editor of the Portlight and the Conch Shell, monthly and annual publications, respectively, of the Academy, and Chairman of the Honor Committee and President of the Literary Society.

In the fall of 1917, he entered the University of Alabama where he enrolled in R.O.T.C. Later, during the First World War, he volunteered as a private in the U.S. Army. DeGraffenried was Honorably Discharged from the Army, at Camp Pike, Arkansas, on December 5, 1918. He was later offered an appointment to the U.S. Military Academy at West Point. Even though he was humbled by the appointment, he chose to return to the study of law at the University of Alabama Law School in 1919. There, in 1921, he received his degree of Bachelor of Law.

He was admitted to the bar in June 1921, and commenced the practice of law in Tuscaloosa, Alabama with his father. He served as solicitor of the sixth judicial circuit of Alabama from 1927 through 1934. He was an unsuccessful candidate for reelection in 1934 and for election in 1938.

DeGraffenried was again elected solicitor and served from January 1943 to January 1947. He was unsuccessful for the Democratic nomination in 1946 to the Eightieth Congress.

DeGraffenried was elected as a Democrat to the Eighty-first and Eighty-second Congresses (January 3, 1949 – January 3, 1953). He was an unsuccessful candidate for renomination in 1952.

After Congress he continued to practice law until his retirement, shortly before his death in Tuscaloosa, Alabama, November 5, 1974, as the Senior Partner at de Graffenried, de Graffenried and de Graffenried, a prominent law firm formed with two of his sons, William Ryan de Graffenried and Jeffries Blunt de Graffenried. Edward deGraffenried was interred in Evergreen Cemetery, Tuscaloosa, Alabama.

With his first wife, Grace, deGraffenried had five children, four sons and one daughter. Three of his sons, Edward III, Jeff and Ryan saw military service during World War II. His youngest son, Christopher, was an alumnus of the University of Alabama and his daughter, Grace is an alumna of Huntingdon College in Montgomery, Alabama.

His second wife was Motie Gay Holman, of Pickens County, AL. They married in Ft. Worth, TX on Oct. 21, 1935.

U.S. House of Representatives
Preceded by Pete Jarman	Member of the U.S. House of Representatives from Alabama's 6th congressional district 1949-1953	Succeeded by Armistead I. Selden Jr.
