= George Wallace =

American politician and lawyer (1919–1998)

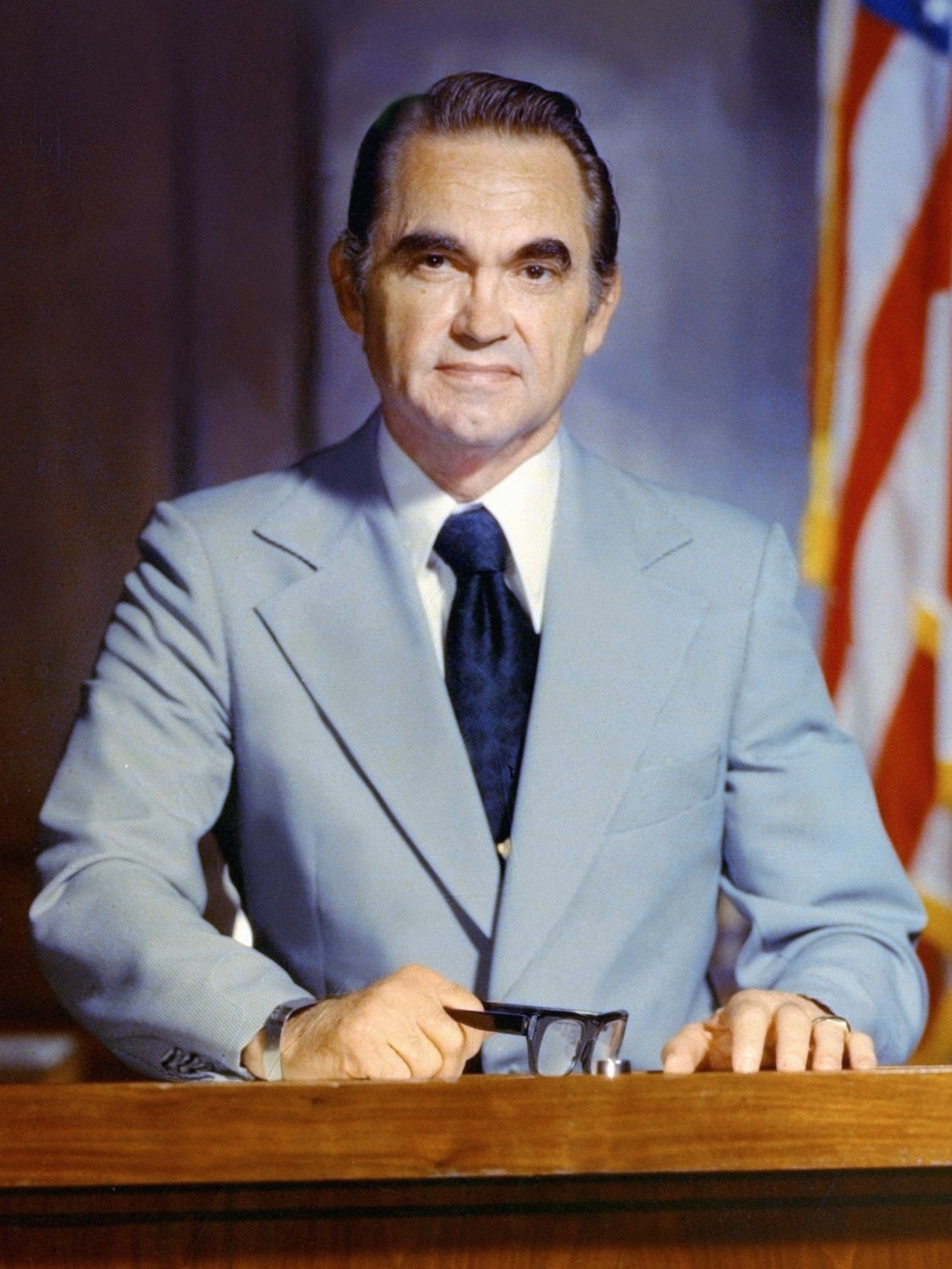
- Official portrait, 1962

45th Governor of Alabama
- In office January 17, 1983 – January 19, 1987
- Lieutenant: Bill Baxley
- Preceded by: Fob James
- Succeeded by: H. Guy Hunt
- In office January 18, 1971 – January 15, 1979 (Note: Jere Beasley served as Acting Governor from June 5 to July 7, 1972, while Wallace recovered from an assassination attempt.)
- Lieutenant: Jere Beasley
- Preceded by: Albert Brewer
- Succeeded by: Fob James
- In office January 14, 1963 – January 16, 1967
- Lieutenant: James Allen
- Preceded by: John Patterson
- Succeeded by: Lurleen Wallace

First Gentleman of Alabama
- In role January 16, 1967 – May 7, 1968
- Governor: Lurleen Wallace
- Preceded by: Lurleen Wallace (as First Lady)
- Succeeded by: Martha Farmer Brewer (as First Lady)

Member of the Alabama House of Representatives from Barbour County
- In office January 3, 1946 – January 1953
- Preceded by: Robert H. Bennett
- Succeeded by: Arthur C. Martin

Personal details
- Born: George Corley Wallace Jr. August 25, 1919 Clio, Alabama, U.S.
- Died: September 13, 1998 (aged 79) Montgomery, Alabama, U.S.
- Resting place: Greenwood Cemetery
- Party: Democratic
- Other political affiliations: American Independent (1968)
- Spouses: Lurleen Burns (m. 1943; died 1968); Cornelia Ellis Snively (m. 1971; div. 1978); Lisa Taylor (m. 1981; div. 1987)
- Children: 4, including George III
- Education: University of Alabama (LLB)

Military service
- Branch/service: United States Army; Army Air Forces
- Years of service: 1942–1945
- Rank: Staff sergeant
- Unit: 468th Bombardment Group
- Battles/wars: World War II; Pacific theater

George Corley Wallace Jr. (August 25, 1919 – September 13, 1998) was an American politician and lawyer who was the 45th and longest-serving governor of Alabama from 1963 to 1967, 1971 to 1979, and 1983 to 1987, and the longest-serving governor from the Democratic Party. Wallace unsuccessfully sought the presidential nomination as a Democrat three times, and once with the American Independent Party, in which he carried five states in the 1968 presidential election. Wallace opposed desegregation and supported the policies of "Jim Crow" during the Civil Rights Movement, declaring in his 1963 inaugural address that he stood for "segregation now, segregation tomorrow, and segregation forever" though he later moderated his views on race and renounced his past support for segregation.

Born in Clio, Alabama, Wallace attended the University of Alabama School of Law, and served in the United States Army Air Force during World War II. After the war, he won election to the Alabama House of Representatives, and served as a state judge. Wallace first sought the Democratic nomination in the 1958 Alabama gubernatorial election. Initially a moderate on racial issues, Wallace adopted a hard-line segregationist stance after losing the 1958 nomination. Wallace ran for governor again in 1962, and won the race.

In his first term, seeking to stop the racial integration of the University of Alabama, Wallace earned national notoriety by standing in front of the entrance of the University of Alabama, blocking the path of black students. He left office when his first term expired in 1967 due to term limits. His wife, Lurleen, won the 1966 election and succeeded him, with him as the de facto governor. His period of influence ended when Lurleen died of cancer in May 1968; her doctor informed Wallace of the cancer's diagnosis in 1961, but he had not told her.

He is remembered for his staunch segregationist views and populist rhetoric. During Wallace's tenure as governor of Alabama, he promoted "industrial development, low taxes, and trade schools." Wallace opposed desegregation and supported the policies of "Jim Crow" during the Civil Rights Movement, declaring in his 1963 inaugural address that he stood for "segregation now, segregation tomorrow, and segregation forever".

Wallace challenged incumbent president Lyndon B. Johnson in the 1964 Democratic presidential primaries, but Johnson prevailed in the race. In the 1968 presidential election, Wallace ran a third-party campaign in an attempt to force a contingent election in the United States House of Representatives, thereby enhancing the political leverage of segregationist Southern leaders. Wallace won five Southern states but failed to force a contingent election. As of the 2024 election, he remains the most recent third-party candidate to receive pledged Electoral College votes from any state.

Wallace won election to the governorship again in 1970, and ran in the 1972 Democratic presidential primaries, having moderated his stance on segregation. However, his campaign effectively ended when he was shot in Maryland by Arthur Bremer, and Wallace remained paralyzed below the waist for the rest of his life. Wallace won re-election as governor in 1974, and he once again unsuccessfully sought the Democratic presidential nomination in the 1976 Democratic presidential primaries. In the late 1970s, Wallace announced that he became a born-again Christian, and moderated his views on race, renouncing his past support for segregation. Wallace left office in 1979, but re-entered politics and won election to a fourth, and final, term as governor in 1982. Wallace's 5,848 days in office as governor is the third-longest in the history of any state, and including his 478 days as de facto governor during Lurleen Wallace's term gives him a total tenure of 6,326 days in charge of Alabama.

== Early life ==
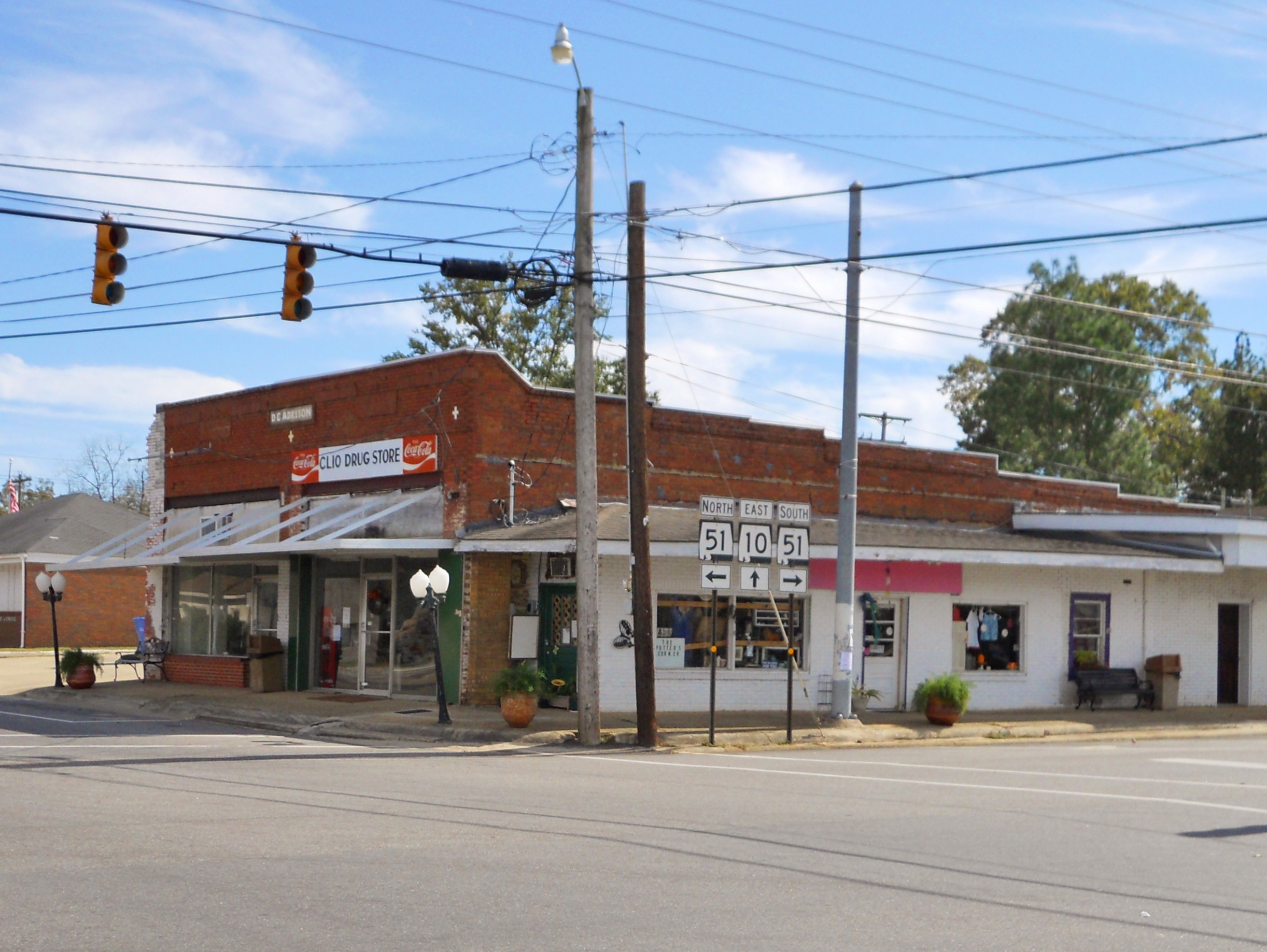
Wallace was born in Clio, Alabama (seen here in 2011).

George Corley Wallace Jr. was born in Clio, Alabama, to George Corley Wallace Sr. and Mozelle Smith. Since his parents disliked the designation "Junior", he was called "George C.", to distinguish him from his father, George Corley Sr., and paternal grandfather, the physician George Oscar Wallace, who was called "Doc Wallace". He had two younger brothers, Gerald and Jack, and a younger sister named Marianne. During World War I, Wallace's father left college to pursue a life of farming when food prices were high. When his father died in 1937, his mother had to sell their farmland to pay existing mortgages. Wallace was raised as a Methodist.

From age ten, Wallace was fascinated with politics. In 1935, he won a contest to serve as a page in the Alabama Senate, and confidently predicted that he would one day be governor. Wallace became a regionally successful boxer in high school, then went directly to law school in 1937 at the University of Alabama School of Law in Tuscaloosa. He was a member of the Delta Chi fraternity. It was at the University of Alabama that he crossed paths with future political adversary Frank Minis Johnson Jr., who would go on to become a prominent liberal federal judge. He received a Bachelor of Laws degree in 1942.

Early in 1943, Wallace was accepted for pilot training by the United States Army Air Forces (USAAF). Soon afterwards Wallace contracted life-threatening spinal meningitis, but prompt medical attention with sulfa drugs saved his life. Left with partial hearing loss and permanent nerve damage, he was instead trained as a flight engineer. During 1945, as a member of a B-29 crew with 468th Bombardment Group, stationed in the Mariana Islands as part of the Twentieth Air Force, Wallace took part in air raids on Japan and reached the rank of staff sergeant. In mid-1945, Wallace received an early discharge on medical grounds, due to "severe anxiety", and a 10% disability pension for "psychoneurosis". (The Twentieth Air Force was commanded by General Curtis LeMay, who was his running mate in the 1968 presidential race.)

== Racial attitude ==
While some may argue that Wallace did not espouse racist views, most sources support the conclusion that he was motivated by racist ideology.

For instance, one source on Wallace's career as a judge reports: "every black attorney who argued a case in Wallace's ... courtroom was struck by his fairness .... But no one who knew Wallace well ever took seriously his earnest profession – uttered a thousand times after 1963 – that he was a segregationist, not a racist."

A reporter covering state politics in 1961 observed that, while other Alabama politicians conversed primarily about women and Alabama football, for Wallace "it was race – race, race, race – and every time that I was closeted alone with him, that's all we talked about."

Wallace's preoccupation with race was based on his belief that black Americans constituted a separate and inferior race. In a 1963 letter to a social studies teacher, Wallace stated that black Americans were inclined to criminality – especially "atrocious acts ... such as rape, assault and murder" – because of a high incidence of venereal disease. Desegregation, he wrote, would lead to "intermarriage ... and eventually our race will be deteriated [sic] to that of the mongrel complexity."

== Early career ==
In 1938, at age 19, Wallace contributed to his grandfather's successful campaign for probate judge. Late in 1945, he was appointed as one of the assistant attorneys general of Alabama, and, in May 1946, he won his first election as a member to the Alabama House of Representatives, succeeding Robert H. Bennett. At the time, he was considered a moderate on racial issues. As a delegate to the 1948 Democratic National Convention, he did not join the Dixiecrat walkout at the convention, despite his opposition to U.S. President Harry S. Truman's proposed civil rights program. Wallace considered it an infringement on states' rights. The Dixiecrats carried Alabama in the 1948 general election, having rallied behind Governor Strom Thurmond of South Carolina. In his 1963 inaugural speech as governor, Wallace excused his failure to walk out of the 1948 convention on political grounds.

In 1952, he became the Circuit Judge of the Third Judicial Circuit in Alabama. Here he became known as "the fighting little judge", a nod to his past boxing association. He gained a reputation for fairness regardless of the race of the plaintiff. It was common practice at the time for judges in the area to refer to black lawyers by their first names, while their white colleagues were addressed formally as "Mister"; black lawyer J. L. Chestnut later said that "Judge George Wallace was the most liberal judge that I had ever practiced law in front of. He was the first judge in Alabama to call me 'Mister' in a courtroom."

On the other hand, Wallace issued injunctions to prevent the removal of segregation signs in rail terminals, becoming the first Southern judge to do so. Similarly, during efforts by civil rights organizations to expand voter registration of black people, Wallace blocked federal efforts to review Barbour County voting lists. He was cited for criminal contempt of court in 1959.

As judge, Wallace granted probation to some black people, which may have cost him the 1958 gubernatorial election.

=== 1958 gubernatorial campaign ===
In 1958, Wallace ran in the Democratic primary for governor. Since the 1901 constitution's effective disfranchisement of black Alabamians, the Democratic Party had been virtually the only party in Alabama. For all intents and purposes, the Democratic primary, which was a political crossroads for Wallace, was the only real contest at the state level. State Representative George C. Hawkins of Gadsden ran, but Wallace's main opponent was Attorney General of Alabama John M. Patterson, who ran with the support of the Ku Klux Klan, an organization Wallace had spoken out against. Despite being endorsed by the NAACP, Wallace lost the nomination by over 34,400 votes.

After the election, aide Seymore Trammell recalled Wallace saying, "Seymore, you know why I lost that governor's race? ... I was outniggered by John Patterson. And I'll tell you here and now, I will never be outniggered again." (Note: Carter (1996, p. 2) notes that Wallace later denied a similar quotation that appeared in a 1968 biography by Marshall Frady: "'Well boys,' he said tightly as he snuffed out his cigar, 'no other son-of-a-bitch will ever out-nigger me again.'" Riechers, Maggie (March–April 2000). "Racism to Redemption: The Path of George Wallace". Humanities. 21 (2). Archived from the original on December 10, 2017. The exact wording is a matter of historical dispute. Some sources quote Wallace as using the word "outsegged". In an extended note in "The Politics of Rage" (1995), p. 96 & 96fn, Carter notes the denial, but says two witnesses confirm the use of the racist language on Election Night, in addition to Seymore Trammell's recollection of Wallace using similar phrasing the next day in his presence.) In the wake of his defeat, Wallace adopted a hard-line segregationist stance and used this stance to court the white vote in the next gubernatorial election in 1962. When a supporter asked why he started using racist messages, Wallace is quoted by biographer Dan T. Carter as having said:

"You know, I tried to talk about good roads and good schools and all these things that have been part of my career, and nobody listened. And then I began talking about niggers, and they stomped the floor."

== Governorships and presidential campaigns ==
=== Segregation ===
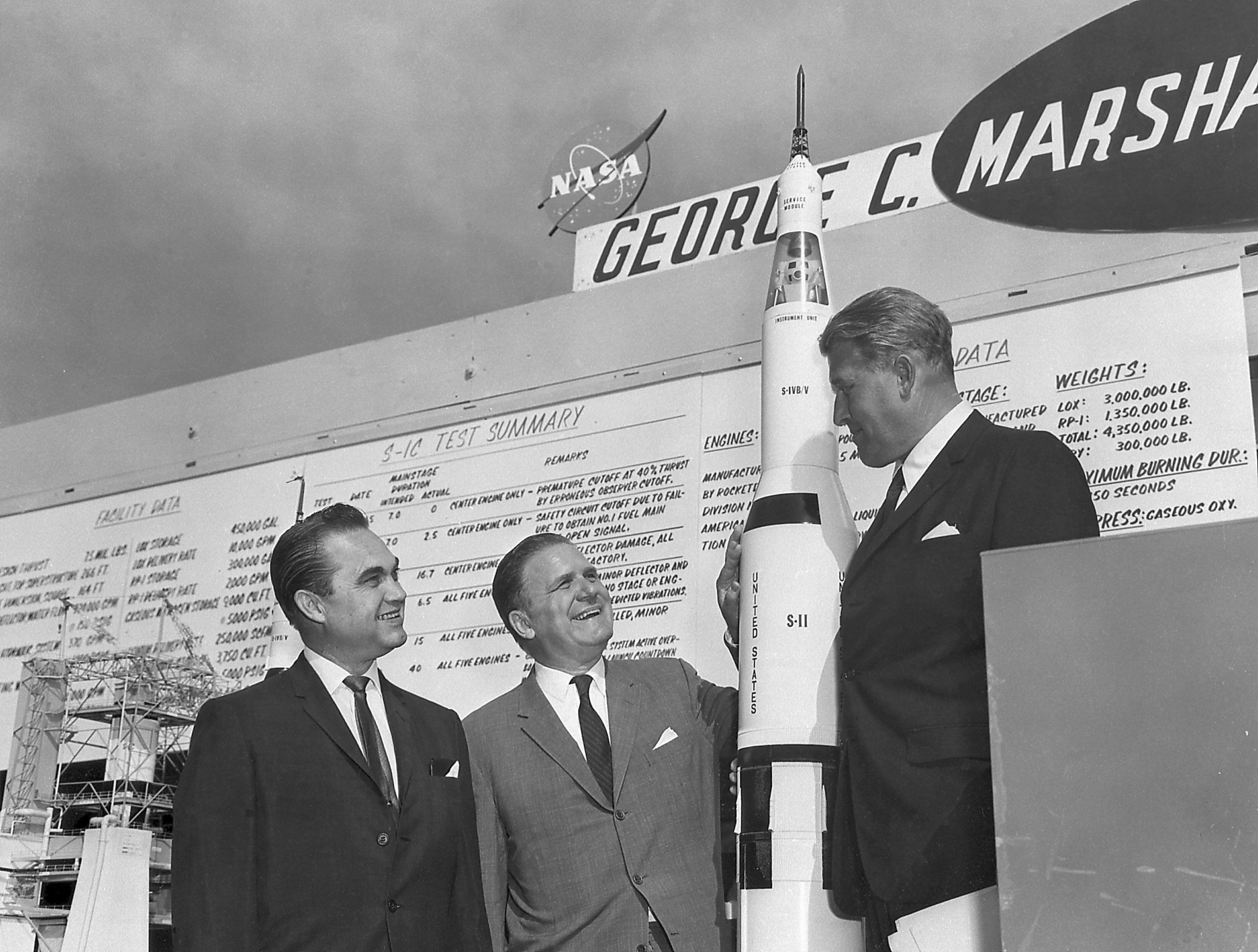
From left to right: Governor Wallace, NASA administrator James E. Webb and scientist Wernher von Braun at the Marshall Space Flight Center in 1965

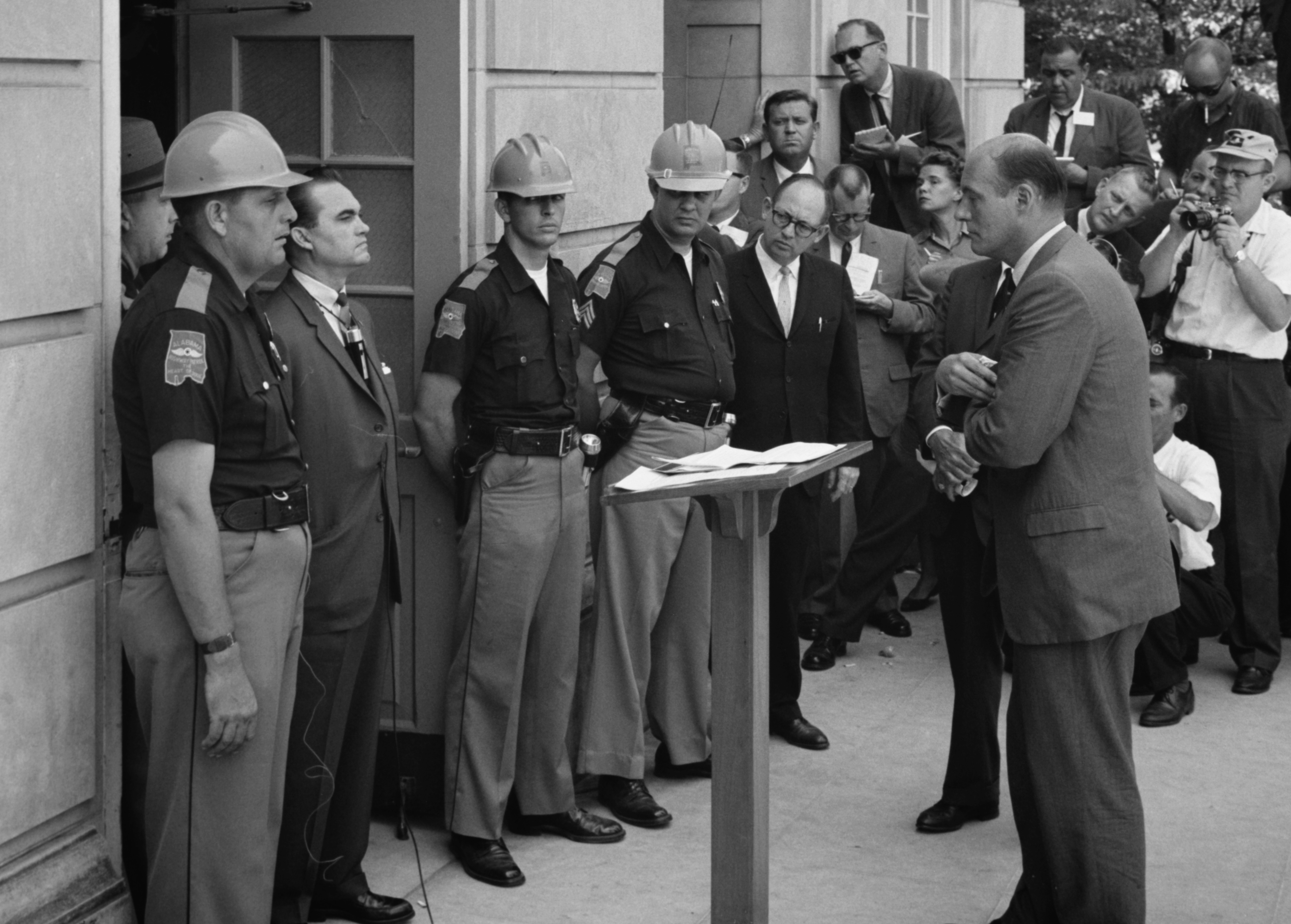
Wallace standing against desegregation while being confronted by U.S. Deputy Attorney General Nicholas Katzenbach at the University of Alabama in 1963

In the 1962 Democratic primary, Wallace finished first, ahead of State Senator Ryan DeGraffenried Sr., and taking 35 percent of the vote. In the runoff, Wallace won the nomination with 55 percent of the vote. As no Republican filed to run, this all but assured Wallace of becoming the next governor. He won a crushing victory in the November general election, taking 96 percent of the vote. As noted above, Democratic dominance had been achieved by disenfranchising most blacks and many poor whites in the state for decades, which lasted until years after federal civil rights legislation was passed in 1964 and 1965.

Wallace took the oath of office on January 14, 1963, standing on the gold star marking the spot where, nearly 102 years earlier, Jefferson Davis was sworn in as provisional president of the Confederate States of America. In his inaugural speech, Wallace said:

In the name of the greatest people that have ever trod this Earth, I draw the line in the dust and toss the gauntlet before the feet of tyranny, and I say segregation now, segregation tomorrow, segregation forever.

This sentence had been written by Wallace's new speechwriter, a former Ku Klux Klan leader Asa Earl Carter.

In 1963, President John F. Kennedy's administration ordered the U.S. Army's 2nd Infantry Division from Fort Benning, Georgia to be prepared to enforce the racial integration of the University of Alabama in Tuscaloosa. In a vain attempt to halt the enrollment of black students Vivian Malone and James Hood, Governor Wallace stood in front of Foster Auditorium at the University of Alabama on June 11, 1963. This became known as the "Stand in the Schoolhouse Door".

In September 1963, Wallace attempted to stop four black students from enrolling in four separate elementary schools in Huntsville. After intervention by a federal court in Birmingham, the four children were allowed to enter on September 9, becoming the first to integrate a primary or secondary school in Alabama.

Wallace desperately wanted to preserve segregation. In his own words: "The President [John F. Kennedy] wants us to surrender this state to Martin Luther King and his group of pro-Communists who have instituted these demonstrations."

Wallace predicted, during a Milwaukee, Wisconsin speech on September 17, 1964, that the office-holding supporters of a civil rights bill would politically "bite the dust" by 1966 and 1968.

External videos
- "Interview with George Wallace" conducted in 1986 for the Eyes on the Prize documentary in which he discusses integration of the University of Alabama, the Birmingham movement, and the Selma voting rights campaign.

The Encyclopædia Britannica characterized him not so much as a segregationist but more as a "populist" who pandered to the white majority of Alabama voters. It notes that his failed attempt at presidential politics created lessons that later influenced the populist candidacies of Jimmy Carter and Ronald Reagan. Jack Newfield wrote in 1971 that Wallace "recently has been sounding like William Jennings Bryan as he attacked concentrated wealth in his speeches".

=== Economics and education ===
The principal achievement of Wallace's first term was an innovation in Alabama industrial development that several other states later copied: he was the first Southern governor to travel to corporate headquarters in northern states to offer tax abatements and other incentives to companies willing to locate plants in Alabama.

15 new trade schools were built during Wallace's term, while free school textbooks were introduced. Wallace also initiated a community college system that has now spread throughout the state, preparing many students to complete four-year degrees at Auburn University, University of Alabama at Birmingham, or the University of Alabama. Wallace Community College (Dothan), is named for his father. Wallace Community College Selma (Selma), and Wallace State Community College (Hanceville) are named for him. Lurleen B. Wallace Community College in Andalusia is named for Wallace's first wife, Lurleen Burns Wallace.

The University of South Alabama, a new state university in Mobile, was chartered in 1963 during Wallace's first year in office as governor.

Other initiatives carried out during Wallace's first term as governor included a cost of living and medical hospital plan for state employees, improvements in aid to indigent persons, an insurance program for state personnel in security work, increased appropriations for mental and tubercular hospitals, a statewide program to help those regarded as intellectually disabled, increases in teachers’ salaries by over 40% and a 100% increase in retired teacher benefits.

Wallace's tenure as governor was also marked by high levels of spending on old age pensions, highways and schools, together with the passage of various labor measures.

=== 1964 Democratic presidential primaries ===
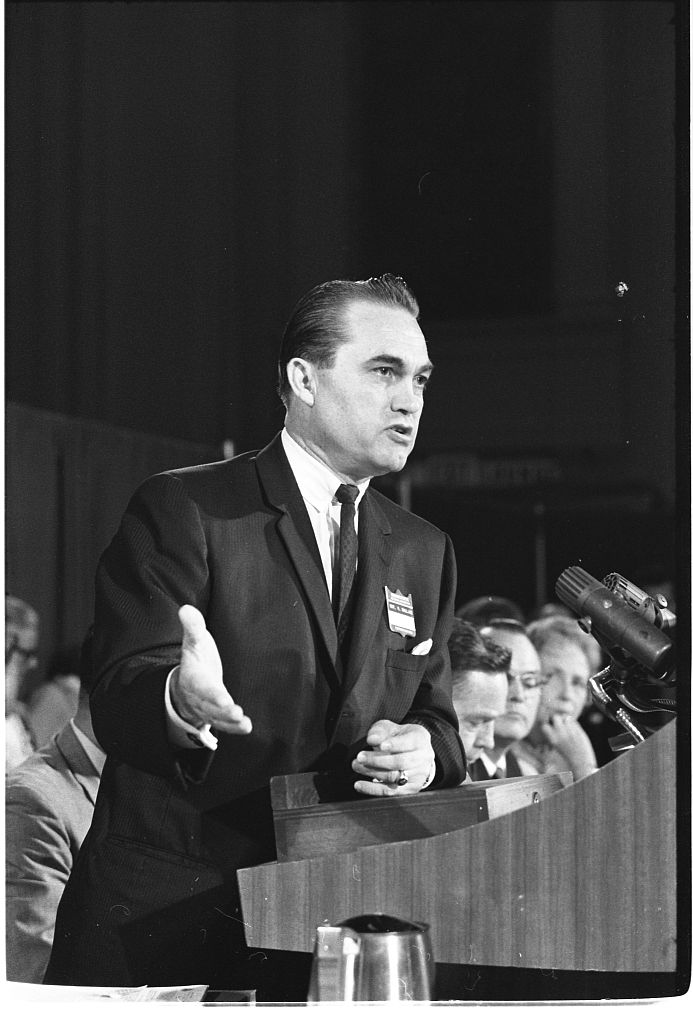
Wallace addressing an audience at the 1964 Democratic National Convention in Atlantic City, New Jersey

On November 15–20, 1963, in Dallas, Wallace announced his intention to oppose the incumbent president, John F. Kennedy, for the 1964 Democratic presidential nomination. Days later, also in Dallas, Kennedy was assassinated, and Vice President Lyndon B. Johnson succeeded him as president.

Building upon his notoriety after the University of Alabama controversy, Wallace entered the Democratic primaries in 1964 on the advice of a public relations expert from Wisconsin. Wallace campaigned strongly by expressing his opposition to integration and a tough approach on crime. In Democratic primaries in Wisconsin, Indiana, and Maryland, Wallace garnered at least a third of the vote running against three Johnson-designated surrogates.

Wallace was known for stirring crowds with his oratory. The Huntsville Times interviewed Bill Jones, Wallace's first press secretary, who recounted "a particularly fiery speech in Cincinnati, Ohio in 1964 that scared even Wallace, [where he] angrily shouted to a crowd of 1,000 people that 'little Pinkos' were 'running around outside' protesting his visit, and continued, after thunderous applause, saying, 'When you and I start marching and demonstrating and carrying signs, we will close every highway in the country.' The audience leaped to its feet and headed for the exit", Jones said, "It shook Wallace. He quickly moved to calm them down."

At graduation exercises in the spring of 1964 at Bob Jones University in Greenville, South Carolina, Wallace received an honorary doctorate. At the commencement, Bob Jones Jr., read the following citation as a tribute to Wallace:

Men who have fought for truth and righteousness have always been slandered, maligned, and misrepresented. The American press in its attacks upon Governor Wallace has demonstrated that it is no longer free, American, or honest. But you, Mr. Governor, have demonstrated not only by the overwhelming victories in the recent elections in your own state of Alabama, but also in the showing which you have made in states long dominated by cheap demagogues and selfish radicals that there is still in America love for freedom, hard common sense, and at least some hope for the preservation of our constitutional liberties.

=== 1964 unpledged elector slate ===
In 1964, Alabama Republicans stood to benefit from the unintended consequences of two developments: (1) Governor Wallace vacating the race for the Democratic presidential nomination against President Johnson, and (2) the designation of unpledged Democratic electors in Alabama, in effect removing President Johnson from the general election ballot. Prior to the 1964 Republican National Convention in San Francisco, Wallace and his aides Bill Jones and Seymore Trammell met in the Jefferson Davis Hotel in Montgomery with Alabama Republican leader James D. Martin, who had narrowly lost the U.S. Senate election in 1962 to J. Lister Hill. Wallace and his aides sought to determine if Barry M. Goldwater, the forthcoming Republican presidential nominee who as a senator from Arizona had voted against the Civil Rights Act of 1964 on libertarian and constitutional grounds, would advocate repeal of the law, particularly the public accommodations and equal employment sections. Bill Jones indicated that Wallace agreed with Goldwater's anti-communist stance but opposed the Republican's proposal to make Social Security a voluntary program. Jones stressed that Wallace had sacrificed his own presidential aspirations that year to allow a direct Republican challenge to President Johnson. It was later disclosed that Wallace proposed at the meeting with Martin to switch parties if he could be named as Goldwater's running-mate, a designation later given to U.S. Representative William E. Miller of New York. Goldwater reportedly rejected the overture because he considered Wallace to be a racist.

The unpledged electors in Alabama included the future U.S. senator, James Allen, then the lieutenant governor, and the subsequent Governor Albert Brewer, then the state House Speaker. National Democrats balked over Johnson's exclusion from the ballot, but most supported the unpledged slate, which competed directly with the Republican electors. As The Tuscaloosa News explained, loyalist electors would have offered a clearer choice to voters than did the unpledged slate.

The 1964 Republican electors were the first since Reconstruction to prevail in Alabama. The Goldwater-Miller slate received 479,085 votes (69.5 percent) to the unpledged electors' 209,848 (30.5 percent). The Republican tide also brought to victory five Republican members of the United States House of Representatives, including William Louis Dickinson, who held the Montgomery-based district seat until 1993, and James D. Martin, the Gadsden oil products dealer who defeated then State Senator George C. Hawkins for the U.S. House seat formerly held by Carl Elliott. Hardly yet sworn into the U.S. House, Martin already had his eyes on Wallace's own position as governor.

=== First Gentleman of Alabama ===
Term limits in the Alabama Constitution prevented Wallace from seeking a second term in 1966. Therefore, Wallace offered his wife, Lurleen Wallace, as a surrogate candidate for governor. In the Democratic primary, she defeated two former governors, Jim Folsom and John M. Patterson, Attorney General Richmond Flowers Sr., and former U.S. Representative Carl Elliott. Largely through the work of Wallace's supporters, the Alabama restriction on gubernatorial succession was later modified to allow two consecutive terms.

Wallace defended his wife's proxy candidacy. He felt somewhat vindicated when Republicans in Idaho denied renomination in 1966 to Governor Robert E. Smylie, author of the article entitled "Why I Feel Sorry for Lurleen Wallace". In his memoirs, Wallace recounts his wife's ability to "charm crowds" and cast-off invective: "I was immensely proud of her, and it didn't hurt a bit to take a back seat to her in vote-getting ability." Wallace rebuffed critics who claimed that he had "dragooned" his wife into the race. "She loved every minute of being governor the same way ... that Mrs. (Margaret) Smith loves being senator."

During the 1966 campaign, George Wallace signed state legislation to nullify desegregation guidelines between Alabama cities and counties and the former United States Department of Health, Education, and Welfare. Wallace claimed that the law would thwart the national government from intervening in schools. Critics denounced Wallace's "political trickery" and expressed alarm at the potential forfeiture of federal funds. Republican gubernatorial candidate James D. Martin accused the Democrats of "playing politics with your children" and "neglecting academic excellence".

Martin also opposed the desegregation guidelines and had sponsored a U.S. House amendment to forbid the placement of students and teachers on the basis of racial quotas. He predicted that Wallace's legislation would propel the issuance of a court order compelling immediate and total desegregation in all public schools. He also compared the new Alabama law to "another two-and-a-half-minute stand in the schoolhouse door".

Lurleen Wallace defeated Martin in the general election on November 8, 1966. She was inaugurated in January 1967, but on May 7, 1968, she died in office of cancer at the age of 41, amid her husband's ongoing second presidential campaign. On her death, she was succeeded by Lieutenant Governor Albert Brewer, who had run without Republican opposition amid the Wallace–Martin races. George Wallace's influence in state government thus subsided until his next bid for election in his own right in 1970. He was "first gentleman" for less than a year and a half.

=== 1968 third-party presidential run ===
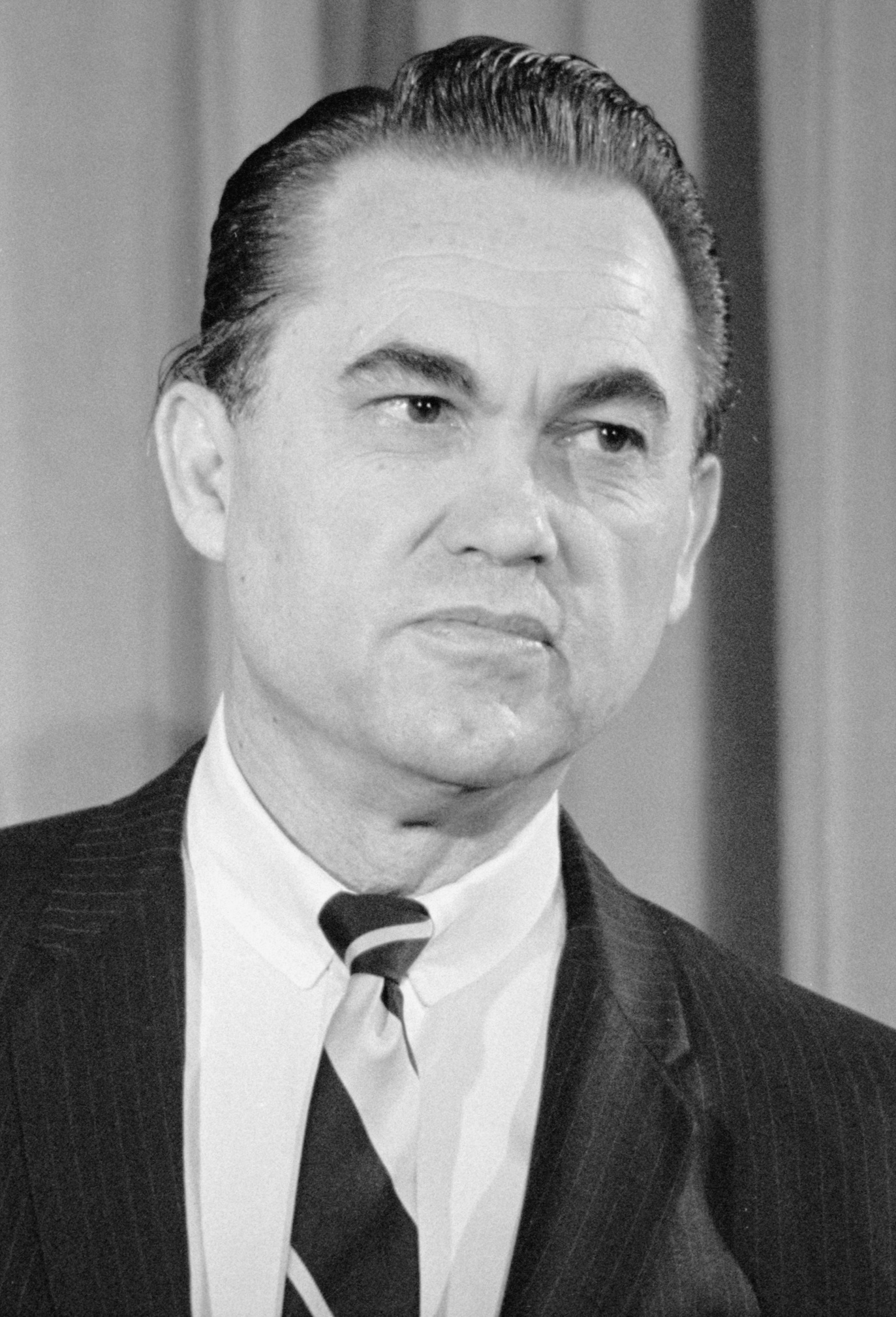
Wallace announcing his Presidential run in 1968

Planning for Wallace's 1968 presidential campaign began with a strategy session on the evening of the March 1967 inauguration of Lurleen Wallace. The meeting featured prominent white supremacists and anti-Semites, including: Asa Carter; William Simmons of the White Citizens' Council; Dallas County Sheriff Jim Clark; former Mississippi governor Ross Barnett; Leander Perez, a fervent Louisiana segregationist and anti-Semite; Kent Courtney, a John Bircher; and "a representative sent by Willis Carto, head of the Liberty Lobby and publisher of the anti-Semitic magazine American Mercury."

Results of the 1968 presidential election (Wallace won the states in orange.)

Wallace ran for president in the 1968 election as the American Independent Party candidate, with Curtis LeMay as his candidate for vice president. Wallace hoped to force the House of Representatives to decide the election with one vote per state if he could obtain sufficient electoral votes to make him a power broker. Wallace hoped that Southern states could use their clout to end federal efforts at desegregation. His platform contained generous increases for beneficiaries of Social Security and Medicare. Wallace's foreign policy positions set him apart from the other candidates in the field. "If the Vietnam War was not winnable within 90 days of his taking office, Wallace pledged an immediate withdrawal of U.S. troops ... Wallace described foreign aid as money 'poured down a rat hole' and demanded that European and Asian allies pay more for their defense."

Richard Nixon feared that Wallace might split the conservative vote and allow the Democratic nominee, Vice President Hubert H. Humphrey, to prevail. He mostly attracted the Southern Democrats who were dissatisfied with the 1964 Civil Rights Act and the 1965 Voting Rights Act that were signed earlier in the decade by President Lyndon B. Johnson. However, some Democrats feared Wallace's appeal to organized blue-collar workers would damage Humphrey in Northern states such as Ohio, New Jersey and Michigan. Wallace ran a "law and order" campaign similar to Nixon's, further worrying Republicans.

In Wallace's 1998 obituary, The Huntsville Times political editor John Anderson summarized the impact from the 1968 campaign: "His startling appeal to millions of alienated white voters was not lost on Richard Nixon and other Republican strategists. First Nixon, then Ronald Reagan, and finally George Herbert Walker Bush successfully adopted toned-down versions of Wallace's anti-busing, anti-federal government platform to pry low- and middle-income whites from the Democratic New Deal coalition." Dan T. Carter, a professor of history at Emory University in Atlanta, added: "George Wallace laid the foundation for the dominance of the Republican Party in American society through the manipulation of racial and social issues in the 1960s and 1970s. He was the master teacher, and Richard Nixon and the Republican leadership that followed were his students."

Wallace considered Happy Chandler, the former baseball commissioner, two-term former governor of Kentucky and former senator from Kentucky, as his running mate in his 1968 campaign as a third-party candidate; as one of Wallace's aides put it, "We have all the nuts in the country; we could get some decent people–-you working one side of the street and he working the other side." Wallace invited Chandler, but when the press published the prospect, Wallace's supporters objected; Chandler had supported the hiring of Jackie Robinson by the Brooklyn Dodgers.

Wallace retracted the invitation, and (after considering Kentucky Fried Chicken founder Colonel Harland Sanders) chose former Air Force General Curtis LeMay of California. LeMay was considered instrumental in the establishment in 1947 of the United States Air Force and an expert in military affairs. His four-star military rank, experience at Strategic Air Command and presence advising President Kennedy during the Cuban Missile Crisis were considered foreign-policy assets to the Wallace campaign. By 1968, LeMay had retired and was serving as chairman of the board of an electronics company, but the company threatened to dismiss him if he took a leave of absence to run for vice president. To keep LeMay on the ticket, Wallace backer and Texas oil tycoon H. L. Hunt set up a million-dollar fund to reimburse LeMay for any income lost in the campaign. Campaign aides tried to persuade LeMay to avoid questions relating to nuclear weapons, but when asked if he thought their use was necessary to win the Vietnam War, he first said that America could win in Vietnam without them. However, he alarmed the audience by further commenting, "we [Americans] have a phobia about nuclear weapons. I think there may be times when it would be most efficient to use nuclear weapons." The "politically tone-deaf" LeMay became a drag on Wallace's candidacy for the remainder of the campaign.

In 1968, Wallace pledged that "If some anarchist lies down in front of my automobile, it will be the last automobile he will ever lie down in front of" and asserted that the only four letter words that hippies did not know were "w-o-r-k" and "s-o-a-p." Responding to criticism of the former comment, Wallace later elaborated that he meant such a protester would be punished under the law, not run over. This type of rhetoric became famous. He accused Humphrey and Nixon of wanting to radically desegregate the South. Wallace said, "There's not a dime's worth of difference between the Republicans and Democrats", a campaign slogan that he had first perfected when Lurleen Wallace defeated James D. Martin.

Major media outlets observed the support Wallace received from extremist groups such as White Citizens' Councils. It has been noted that members of such groups had permeated the Wallace campaign by 1968 and, while Wallace did not openly seek their support, he also never refused it. Indeed, at least one case has been documented of the pro-Nazi and white supremacist Liberty Lobby distributing a pro-Wallace pamphlet entitled "Stand up for America" despite the campaign's denial of such a connection. Unlike Strom Thurmond in 1948, Wallace generally avoided race-related discussions. He mostly criticized hippies and "pointy-headed intellectuals". He denied he was racist, saying once, "I've never made a racist speech in my life."

While Wallace carried five Southern states, won almost ten million popular votes and 45 electoral votes, Nixon received 301 electoral votes, more than required to win the election. Wallace remains the last non-Democratic, non-Republican candidate to win any pledged electoral votes. Wallace also received the vote of one North Carolina elector who had been pledged to Nixon.

Many found Wallace an entertaining campaigner. To "hippies" who called him a fascist, he replied, "I was killing fascists when you punks were in diapers." Another notable quip: "They're building a bridge over the Potomac for all the white liberals fleeing to Virginia."

Wallace decried the United States Supreme Court's binding opinion in Alexander v. Holmes County Board of Education, which ordered immediate desegregation of Southern schools – he said the new Burger court was "no better than the Warren court" and called the justices "limousine hypocrites".

=== Second term as governor ===
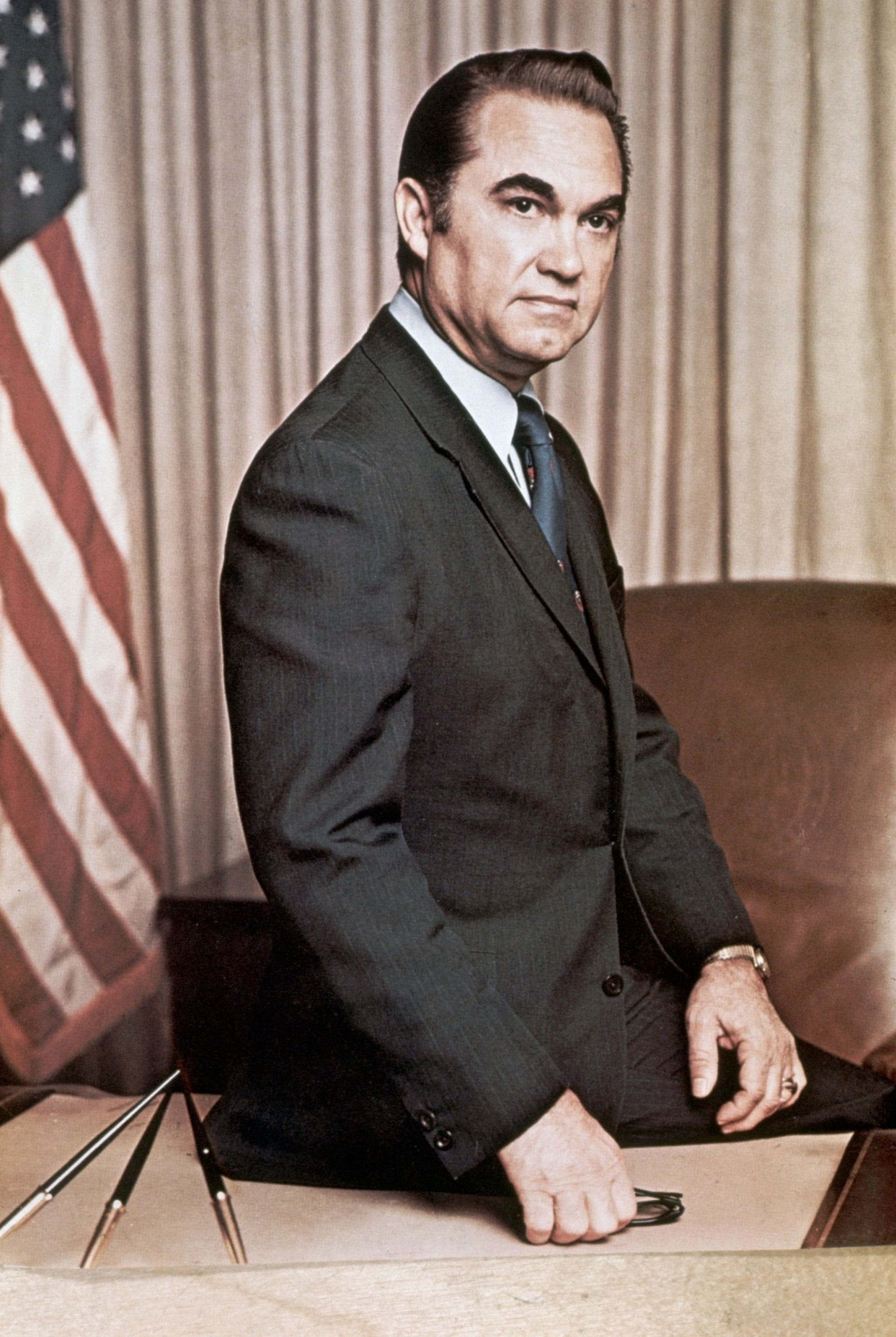
Official portrait, c. 1970

In 1970, Wallace sought the Democratic nomination against incumbent governor Albert Brewer, who was the first gubernatorial candidate since Reconstruction to seek African American voter support. Although in the 1966 gubernatorial election then state Attorney General Richmond Flowers championed civil rights for all and, with the support of most of Alabama's black voters, finished second in the Democratic primary. Brewer unveiled a progressive platform and worked to build an alliance between blacks and the white working class. Of Wallace's out-of-state trips, Brewer said, "Alabama needs a full-time governor!"

In the primary, Brewer received the most votes but failed to win a majority, which triggered a runoff election.

In what later U.S. President Jimmy Carter called "one of the most racist campaigns in modern southern political history", Wallace aired television advertising with slogans such as "Do you want the black bloc electing your governor?" and circulated an ad showing a white girl surrounded by seven black boys, with the slogan "Wake Up Alabama! Blacks vow to take over Alabama." Wallace slurred Brewer, whom he called "Sissy Britches", and his family. In the runoff, Wallace narrowly won the Democratic nomination and won the general election in a landslide.

Though Wallace had promised not to run for president a third time, the day after the election, he flew to Wisconsin to campaign for the upcoming 1972 United States presidential election. Wallace, whose presidential ambitions would have been destroyed by a defeat for governor, has been said to have run "one of the nastiest campaigns in state history", using racist rhetoric while proposing few new ideas.

=== 1972 Democratic presidential primaries ===
Green states went to George Wallace in the 1972 Democratic primaries.

George Wallace 1972 presidential campaign logo

On January 13, 1972, Wallace declared himself a Democratic candidate. The field included Senator George McGovern, 1968 nominee and former U.S. vice president Hubert Humphrey, and nine other Democratic opponents.

Wallace announced that he no longer supported segregation and had always been a "moderate" on racial matters. This position has been compared to that of Nixon, who in 1969 had instituted the first affirmative action program, the Philadelphia Plan that established goals and timetables. However, Wallace (similarly to Nixon) expressed continued opposition to desegregation busing. For the next four months, Wallace's campaign proceeded well. In Florida's primary, Wallace carried every county to win 42% of the vote.

=== Assassination attempt ===
Wallace lies wounded on the ground immediately after the assassination attempt, as his wife, Cornelia, embraces him.

On May 15, 1972, Wallace was shot four times by Arthur Bremer while campaigning at the Laurel Shopping Center in Laurel, Maryland, at a time when he was receiving high ratings in national opinion polls. Bremer was seen at a Wallace rally in Wheaton, Maryland, earlier that day and two days earlier at a rally in Kalamazoo, Michigan. Wallace was hit in the abdomen and chest, and one of the bullets lodged in Wallace's spinal column, leaving him paralyzed from the waist down for the rest of his life. No bullets hit his major organs though one narrowly missed his aorta. A five-hour operation was needed that evening, and Wallace had to receive several units of blood to survive. Three others who were wounded in the shooting also survived. The shooting and Wallace's subsequent injuries put an effective end to his bid for the Democratic presidential nomination. The assassination attempt was caught on film.

Bremer's diary, An Assassin's Diary, published after his arrest, shows he was motivated in the assassination attempt by a desire for fame, not by political ideology. (Note: After the diary was read as evidence in court (including a passage where Bremer wonders whether Wallace's death will bring enough media coverage), William V. Shannon commented, "He... wanted to have his face flashed on millions of television screens and his name printed on the front pages of every newspaper." Psychologist James W. Clarke notes, "Bremer had never been interested in politics... any prominent political leader would do since it was not ideology which motivated" him.) He had considered President Nixon an earlier target. He was convicted at trial. On August 4, 1972, Bremer was sentenced to 63 years in prison, later reduced to 53 years. Bremer served 35 years and was released on parole on November 9, 2007.

CBS News correspondent David Dick won an Emmy Award for his coverage of the attempt on Wallace's life.

=== Rest of the campaign ===
A campaign brochure

Following the assassination attempt, Wallace was visited at the hospital by Democratic Representative and presidential primary rival Shirley Chisholm, a representative from Bedford–Stuyvesant, Brooklyn. At the time, she was the nation's only African-American female member of Congress. Despite their ideological differences and the opposition of Chisholm's constituents, Chisholm felt visiting Wallace was the humane thing to do. Other people to visit Wallace in hospital were President Nixon, Vice President Spiro Agnew, and presidential primary rivals Hubert Humphrey, George McGovern, and Ted Kennedy. He also received telegrams from former President Lyndon Johnson, California governor Ronald Reagan and Pope Paul VI.

After the shooting, Wallace won primaries in Maryland and Michigan, but his near assassination effectively ended his campaign. From his wheelchair, Wallace spoke on July 11, 1972, at the Democratic National Convention in Miami Beach, Florida.

Since Wallace was out of Alabama for more than 20 days while he was recovering in Holy Cross Hospital in Silver Spring, Maryland, the state constitution required Lieutenant Governor Jere Beasley to serve as acting governor from June 5 until Wallace's return to Alabama on July 7. Wallace resumed his gubernatorial duties and easily won the 1974 primary and general election, when he defeated Republican State Senator Elvin McCary, a real estate developer from Anniston, who received less than 15% of the ballots cast.

In 1992, when asked to comment on the 20th anniversary of his attempted assassination, Wallace replied, "I've had 20 years of pain."

=== 1976 Democratic presidential primaries ===
States in green went to Wallace in the 1976 Democratic primaries.

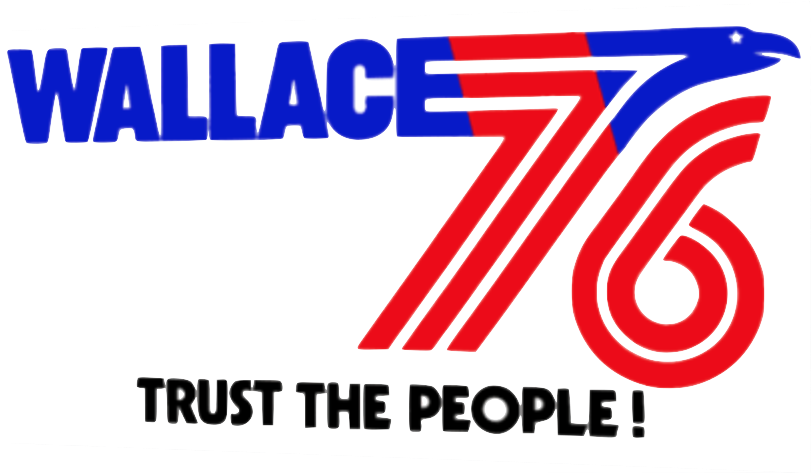
George Wallace 1976 presidential campaign logo

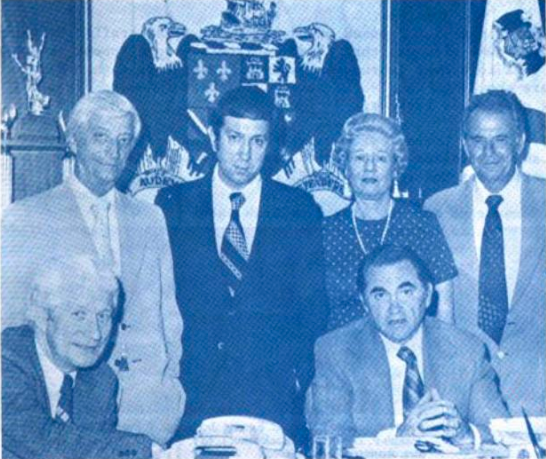
Wallace (right, seated) hosting a highway safety conference in 1975

In November 1975, Wallace announced his fourth bid for the presidency, again participating in the Democratic presidential primaries. Wallace's campaign was plagued by voter concern about his health as well as the media use of images that portrayed him as nearly helpless. His supporters complained that such coverage was motivated by bias, citing the discretion used in coverage of Franklin D. Roosevelt's paralysis, before television became commercially available. In the Southern primaries and caucuses, Wallace carried only Mississippi, South Carolina and his home state of Alabama. If the popular vote in all primaries and caucuses were combined, Wallace would have placed third behind former Georgia governor Jimmy Carter and California governor Jerry Brown. After the primaries were completed, and he had lost several Southern primaries to Carter, Wallace left the race in June 1976. He eventually endorsed Carter, who defeated Republican incumbent Gerald Ford.

=== Final term as governor ===
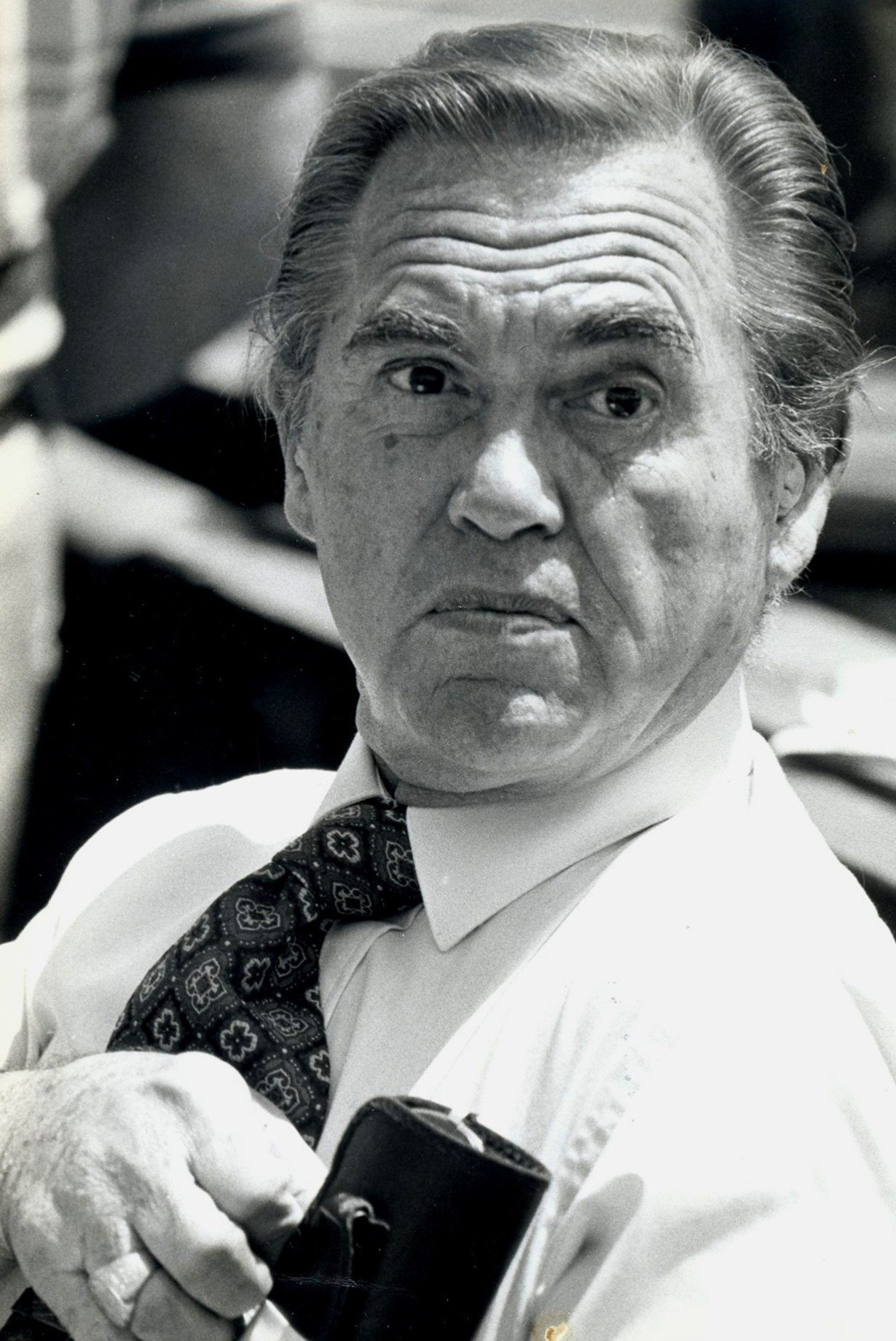
Wallace in 1982 at the Elmore Airshow in Elmore, Alabama

Wallace began to moderate on race in the late 1970s. During this time, Wallace announced that he was a born-again Christian and apologized to black civil rights leaders for his past actions as a segregationist. He said that while he had once sought power and glory, he realized he needed to seek love and forgiveness. (Note: According to Carter (1995, pp. 236–37), "But no one who knew Wallace well ever took seriously his earnest profession – uttered a thousand times after 1963 – that he [had been] a segregationist, not a racist. ... Wallace, like most white southerners of his generation, [had] genuinely believed blacks to be a separate, inferior race.") In 1979, Wallace said of his stand in the schoolhouse door: "I was wrong. Those days are over, and they ought to be over." He publicly asked for forgiveness from black Americans.

In the 1982 Alabama gubernatorial Democratic primary, Wallace's main opponents were Lieutenant Governor George McMillan and Alabama House Speaker Joe McCorquodale. In the primary, McCorquodale was eliminated, and the vote went to a runoff, with Wallace holding a slight edge over McMillan. Wallace won the Democratic nomination by a margin of 51 to 49 percent. In the general election, his opponent was Montgomery Republican Mayor Emory Folmar. Polling experts at first thought the 1982 election was the best chance since Reconstruction for a Republican to be elected as governor of Alabama. Ultimately, though, it was Wallace, not Folmar, who claimed victory.

During the 1982 election, Wallace presented himself as ideologically liberal, declaring "We'll talk about people who are unemployed and hungry, and about Republicans who only have to worry about who will mow their beachfront lawns." Wallace also spoke about his big spending policies during his previous terms as governor, and vowed that if elected to a fourth term as governor,

I’m going to be a big spender again … for education, roads, country roads, the disadvantaged, the disabled, the blind, the deaf … If that makes me a liberal, then I’m a liberal.

During Wallace's final term as governor (1983–1987) he appointed a record number of black Americans to state positions, including, for the first time, two as members in the cabinet.

On April 2, 1986, Wallace announced at a press conference in Montgomery that he would not run for a fifth term as Governor of Alabama, and would retire from public life after leaving the governor's mansion in January 1987. Wallace achieved four gubernatorial terms across three decades, totaling 16 years in office.

== Personal life ==
Wallace married Lurleen Brigham Burns on May 22, 1943. The couple had four children together: Bobbi Jo (1944–2015) Parsons, Peggy Sue (1950) Kennedy, George III, known as George Junior (1951), and Janie Lee (1961), who was named after Robert E. Lee.

Lurleen was the first woman to be elected governor of Alabama, which she did as a stand-in for her husband, who was barred from serving another term. In 1961, in keeping with the practice of many at the time to shield patients from discussion of cancer, which was greatly feared, Wallace had withheld information from her that a uterine biopsy had found possibly precancerous cells. He also failed to seek appropriate care for her. When she saw a gynecologist for abnormal bleeding in 1965, her diagnosis of uterine cancer came as a complete shock. Lurleen was outraged to learn from one of her husband's aides that the staffers had known of her cancer since Wallace's 1962 campaign three years earlier.

Wallace continued to make campaign stops nationwide during Lurleen's last weeks of life and persistently lied to the press about her condition, claiming in April 1968 that "she has won the fight" against cancer. After Lurleen's death in 1968, the couple's younger children, aged 18, 16, and 6, were sent to live with family members and friends for care (their eldest daughter had already married and left home).

Their son, commonly called George Wallace Jr., is a Democrat-turned-Republican formerly active in Alabama politics. He was twice elected state treasurer as a Democrat, and twice elected to the Alabama Public Service Commission. He lost a race in 2006 for the Republican nomination for lieutenant governor. In 2010, Wallace Jr. failed by a wide margin to win the Republican nod to regain his former position as state treasurer.

On January 4, 1971, Wallace wed Cornelia "C'nelia" Ellis Snively (1939–2009), a niece of former Alabama governor "Big Jim" Folsom. Snively had been a performer and was nicknamed "the Jackie Kennedy of the rednecks." The couple had a bitter divorce in 1978. A few months after that divorce, Cornelia told Parade magazine, "I don't believe George needs a family. He just needs an audience. The family as audience wasn't enough for his ego." Snively died at the age of 69 on January 8, 2009.

On September 9, 1981, Wallace married Lisa Taylor, a country music singer; they divorced on February 2, 1987, weeks after Wallace had left office for the fourth and final time.

Wallace's daughter Peggy was 12 years old when he ran successfully for governor. She has shared that she was not treated nicely out in public due to her father's segregationist views. Some people would not shake her hand because of her last name. She would go to school wanting to befriend the black students, but she assumed that they would not like her because of what her father had done.

== Final years and death ==
In a 1995 interview, Wallace said that he planned to vote for Republican Bob Dole in the 1996 presidential election, commenting, "He's a good man. His wife is a born-again Christian woman and I believe he is, too." He also revealed that he had voted for George H. W. Bush, another Republican, in 1992. His son, George Wallace Jr., officially switched from Democrat to Republican that same year. Wallace himself declined to identify as either a Republican or a Democrat. But he added, "The state is slowly going Republican because of Clinton being so liberal."

In his later years, Wallace grew deaf and developed Parkinson's disease.

Wallace eventually apologized to and met with Vivian Malone Jones and James Hood, the black students whom he had attempted to block from integrating the University of Alabama via the Stand in the Schoolhouse Door. The George Wallace Family Foundation had chosen Malone to receive the first Lurleen B. Wallace Award of Courage in October 1996, and Wallace himself presented the award to her. The night before the presentation, Malone and Wallace met privately where he apologized for his conduct, and she told him she had long-since forgiven him. Wallace praised her during the award presentation the next day, saying "Vivian Malone Jones was at the center of the fight over states' rights and conducted herself with grace, strength and, above all, courage."

When Hood returned to the University of Alabama to earn a Ph.D. in interdisciplinary studies, he started a book on Wallace in 1996 and sat at his bedside for hours of interviews. Hood believed in the sincerity of Wallace's apologies, saying that Wallace was haunted by people's lack of forgiveness for his actions. Hood graduated in 1997 and requested that Wallace present his degree, and Wallace would have if not for his poor health. Hood instead attended Wallace's 1998 funeral.

At a restaurant a few blocks from the State Capitol, Wallace became something of a fixture. In constant pain, he was surrounded by an entourage of old friends and visiting well-wishers and continued this ritual until a few weeks before his death. Wallace died of septic shock from a bacterial infection in Jackson Hospital in Montgomery on September 13, 1998. He had respiratory problems in addition to complications from his gunshot spinal injury. His grave is located at Greenwood Cemetery, in Montgomery.

== Legacy ==
External videos
- Booknotes interview with Stephen Lesher on George Wallace: American Populist, February 27, 1994, C-SPAN
- Washington Journal interview with Dan T. Carter on the influence of George Wallace, June 23, 2001, C-SPAN

Although George Wallace moderated later in his political career, at the time of his death he was still widely seen as a segregationist symbol. Wallace was an unusual candidate who refused to condemn political violence. Ziblatt and Levitsky describe Wallace as an autocratic figure who exhibited a casual disregard for the Constitution. Wallace was the subject of a documentary, George Wallace: Settin' the Woods on Fire (2000), shown by PBS on The American Experience.

Wallace is the third longest-serving governor in U.S. history, having served 5,848 days in office, as well as being the longest serving governor from the Democratic Party.

With four failed runs for president, Wallace was unsuccessful in national politics. His impact on American politics was significant with his biographers calling him "the most influential loser" in 20th century American politics.

The 1984 book, Bloods, by Wallace Terry, includes a story about Sergeant Major Edgar A. Huff, the first African American sergeant major in the US Marine Corps. Huff stated that when he retired, Governor Wallace "called to tell me how proud he was of my career and how it stands as an example for others to follow."

The TNT cable network produced a movie, George Wallace (1997), directed by John Frankenheimer and starring Gary Sinise. Sinise received an Emmy Award for his performance during a ceremony held the day Wallace died. Sinise reprised this role in the 2002 film Path to War. In the 2014 film Selma, which was set during the Civil Rights Movement, which then-Governor Wallace publicly opposed, Wallace was portrayed by actor Tim Roth. The George Wallace Tunnel on Interstate 10, constructed in 1973, was named for him. Three community colleges in Alabama are named for Wallace: Wallace Community College, Wallace Community College Selma, and Wallace State Community College. Lurleen B. Wallace Community College is named for his wife. In 2020, amidst a change in public opinion, many Alabama universities were pushed to rename campus buildings that were originally named after Wallace. This included, but was not limited to, the University of Montevallo and Auburn University. The University of Montevallo has been unsuccessful in renaming the George C. Wallace Speech and Hearing Center because the building was named via Act 110 by the Alabama Legislature in 1975. The University of Alabama in Birmingham successfully removed Wallace's name from the physical education building after a vote in 2021.

== See also ==
- Democratic backsliding in the United States
- Electoral history of George Wallace
- Southern Democrats

== Bibliography ==
- Carter, Dan T. (1995). The Politics of Rage: George Wallace, the Origins of the New Conservatism, and the Transformation of American Politics. Baton Rouge: Louisiana State University Press. ISBN 978-0-684-80916-8. online
- Brands, H.W. (2010). American Dreams: The United States Since 1945. New York: Penguin Press. ISBN 978-1594202629.
- Parmet, Herbert S. (1990). Richard Nixon and His America. Boston: Little, Brown & Co. ISBN 978-0-316-69232-8.

Party political offices
Preceded by John Patterson	Democratic nominee for Governor of Alabama; 1962	Succeeded by Lurleen Wallace
New political party	American Independent nominee for President of the United States; 1968	Succeeded by John G. Schmitz
Preceded by Lurleen Wallace	Democratic nominee for Governor of Alabama; 1970, 1974	Succeeded by Fob James
Preceded by Fob James	Democratic nominee for Governor of Alabama; 1982	Succeeded by Bill Baxley
Political offices
Preceded by John Patterson	Governor of Alabama; 1963–1967	Succeeded by Lurleen Wallace
Preceded by Albert Brewer	Governor of Alabama; 1971–1979	Succeeded by Fob James
Preceded by Fob James	Governor of Alabama; 1983–1987	Succeeded by H. Guy Hunt
Honorary titles
Preceded by Lurleen Wallace as First Lady of Alabama	First Gentleman of Alabama; 1967–1968	Succeeded by Martha Farmer Brewer as First Lady of Alabama
