= J. P. Shelton =

American politician

Member of the Alabama House of Representatives from the Tuscaloosa County district
- In office 1947–1954
- Succeeded by: Ryan DeGraffenried, Sr.

Personal details
- Born: James Pervis Shelton; October 2, 1886 Cuba, Alabama, U.S.
- Died: May 6, 1954 (aged 67) Tuscaloosa, Alabama, U.S.
- Party: Democratic
- Spouse: Annie Elizabeth Walker (1905–?)
- Children: 4

James Pervis Shelton^{[n1]} (October 2, 1886 – May 6, 1954) was an American politician from the U.S. state of Alabama.

== Early life ==
Shelton was born in Cuba, Alabama in 1886 to Louis Caserel and Nancy (née Thorn) Shelton.

== Career ==
Shelton served as Tuscaloosa's Justice of the Peace from 1920 until 1926. He also served on the city's Board of Registrars from 1935 to 1947. Shelton, a Democrat, was first elected to the Alabama House of Representatives in 1947 for the district of Tuscaloosa. During his time in the house, Shelton played an instrumental role in the building of new trade schools in the Tuscaloosa area, serving until his death in 1954. Shelton died in May 1954 shortly after winning the Democratic nomination for another term in the House of Representatives. He was buried in Tuscaloosa. In a resolution presented to the House, close colleague Artemas K. "Temo" Callahan described him as a "true southern gentleman and genuine statesman". Ryan DeGraffenried, Sr. was elected in a special election for his seat in November.

A trade school that opened in 1953 was named the J. P. Shelton Trade School following his death by a joint resolution in the Alabama House of Representatives. The school was later renamed Shelton State Community College after a merger with Brewer State Junior College in 1979. Shelton and former representative Callahan were both honored at Shelton State's 50th anniversary celebrations in 2003.

== Personal life ==
Shelton married Annie Elizabeth Walker of York, Alabama on January 24, 1905. They had four children, Eva Ray, Janett, Joseph Vernon, and Bacon Bernard. He was a member of the Grand Lodge of the Knights of Pythias and wrote a newspaper column, "Shelton Says", and a book of the same title.

== Notes ==
- ^[n1] Middle name also spelled "Purvis"
