= 1962 Alabama gubernatorial election =

- November 6, 1962
Nominee	George Wallace	Frank P. Walls
Party	Democratic	Independent
Popular vote	303,987	11,789
Percentage	96.27%	3.73%
- County results Wallace: 80–90% >90%
Governor before election
John M. Patterson
Democratic
Elected Governor
George Wallace
Democratic

The 1962 Alabama gubernatorial election took place on November 6, 1962. Incumbent Democrat John Malcolm Patterson was term limited and could not seek a second consecutive term.

== Democratic Party nomination ==
At this time Alabama was a de facto one-party state, with little challenge to the Democratic Party from outside parties. The highly contested part of the race for governor took place during the party's primaries.

Incumbent Governor John M. Patterson was barred from seeking a second consecutive term.

=== Candidates ===
- Albert Boutwell, Lieutenant Governor
- Bull Connor, Birmingham Public Safety Commissioner
- Jim Folsom, former Governor
- Ryan DeGraffenried Sr., State Representative
- MacDonald Gallion, Attorney General
- J. Bruce Henderson
- Wayne Jennings
- George Wallace, former Circuit Judge and former State Representative

Among three main contenders – Folsom, DeGraffenried and Wallace – the former two were considered to be progressive or moderate. Folsom, who served as Governor from 1947 to 1951 and again from 1955 to 1959, was one of the first Southern chief executives who spoke out in favor of desegregation and voting rights for any African Americans, which led to him frequently clashing with the Legislature on a number of issues. DeGraffenried also ran as a moderate, especially on the race issues.

Wallace, who lost a close primary to Patterson in 1958, ran that year as a Folsom-style moderate (he was indeed a close Folsom ally), and even received the official NAACP endorsement, while Patterson ran as a strong segregationist, accepting the official Ku Klux Klan endorsement.

After he lost in 1958, Wallace adopted a strong segregationist stance as well in order to secure votes.

=== Results ===
In the primary, held on May 1, Wallace finished first but failed to win a majority. Folsom and DeGraffenried split the moderate vote, and DeGraffenried, as the second-place finisher, faced Wallace in the runoff. Many believed that a controversial TV appearance, in which Folsom appeared to be seriously drunk, cost him the election.

Democratic primary results
Party	Candidate	Votes	%
Democratic	George Wallace	207,062	32.49
Democratic	Ryan DeGraffenried Sr.	160,704	25.22
Democratic	Jim Folsom	159,640	25.05
Democratic	MacDonald Gallion	80,374	12.61
Democratic	Bull Connor	23,019	3.61
Democratic	J. Bruce Henderson	3,666	0.58
Democratic	Wayne Jennings	1,946	0.31
Democratic	Albert Boutwell	862	0.14
Total votes		637,273	100

Wallace defeated DeGraffenried in the runoff, held on May 29.

Primary runoff results by county: Wallace: 50–60%; 60–70%; 70–80%; 80–90%; >90%; deGraffenried: 50–60%; 60–70%

Democratic runoff results
Party	Candidate	Votes	%
Democratic	George Wallace	340,730	55.87
Democratic	Ryan DeGraffenried Sr.	269,122	44.13
Total votes		609,852	100

== Other nominations ==
The Republican Party did not field a candidate.

Wallace's sole rival was Frank P. Walls, an independent who was later an Alabama Conservative Party congressional candidate.

== General election ==
As expected, Wallace won in a landslide.

1962 Alabama gubernatorial election
Party	Candidate	Votes	%	±%
Democratic	George Wallace	303,987	96.27	+8.05%
Independent	Frank P. Walls	11,789	3.73	N/A
Majority		292,198	92.54	
Turnout		315,776		
Democratic hold				
