= George McMillan (politician) =

American politician (1943–2025)

George McMillan, Jr.
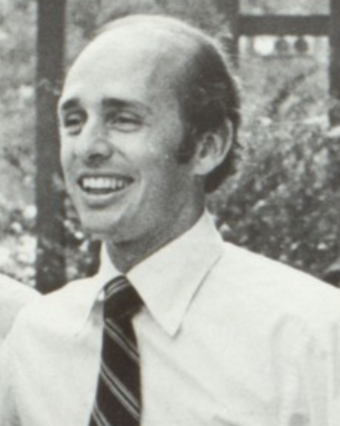

23rd Lieutenant Governor of Alabama
- In office January 15, 1979 – January 17, 1983
- Governor: Fob James
- Preceded by: Jere Beasley
- Succeeded by: Bill Baxley

Member of the Alabama Senate from the 11th district
- In office 1974–1978

Member of the Alabama House of Representatives
- In office 1973–1973

Personal details
- Born: George Duncan Hastie McMillan Jr. October 11, 1943 Greenville, Alabama, U.S.
- Died: April 18, 2025 (aged 81) Birmingham, Alabama, U.S.
- Party: Democratic
- Spouse: Ann Louise Dial
- Children: 2

George Duncan Hastie McMillan Jr. (October 11, 1943 – April 18, 2025) was an American Democratic politician who served as the 23rd lieutenant governor of Alabama from 1979 to 1983. In 1989, he founded the City Stages music festival in downtown Birmingham, Alabama.

== Early life and education ==
McMillan was born in Greenville, Alabama. He earned a Bachelor of Arts degree from Auburn University in 1966, and a Juris Doctor from the University of Virginia School of Law in 1969.

== Political career ==
=== Legislative career ===
McMillan was elected to the Alabama House of Representatives and served for one term in 1973 for Jefferson County. He was then elected to the Alabama Senate in 1974, with his term lasting until 1978.

=== Lieutenant governor ===
McMillan was elected to the office of Lieutenant Governor of Alabama on November 7, 1978 under Governor Fob James.

=== Gubernatorial campaign ===
McMillan ran in the Democratic gubernatorial primary election in 1982, but was beaten by incumbent Governor George Wallace, coming in second place despite the endorsement of the state’s black leaders and receiving 65% of the black vote. A run-off election was held between McMillan and Wallace, which Wallace won, going on to win the general election against Republican Mayor Emory Folmar of Montgomery. A progressive, he would have been considered a potential New South governor, if he had won the election.

== Personal life and death ==
Starting in 1989, McMillan served as Birmingham Cultural and Heritage Foundation's President and Executive Producer, for 21 years.

McMillan founded the City Stages music festival in Birmingham, Alabama, which ran for two decades.

He was married to Ann Louise Dial and had two children with her, George D.H. McMillan III and Ann Dial Sims.

McMillan died from complications of surgery on April 18, 2025, at the age of 81. Governor Kay Ivey memorialized him as "a man of great ideas". Ivey also ordered the state flag to fly at half staff for McMillan once funeral arrangements could be made.

Party political offices
Preceded by Jere Beasley	Democratic nominee for Lieutenant Governor of Alabama; 1978	Succeeded by Bill Baxley
Political offices
Preceded by Jere Beasley	Lieutenant Governor of Alabama; 1979–1983	Succeeded by Bill Baxley
