= 1982 Alabama gubernatorial election =

- November 2, 1982
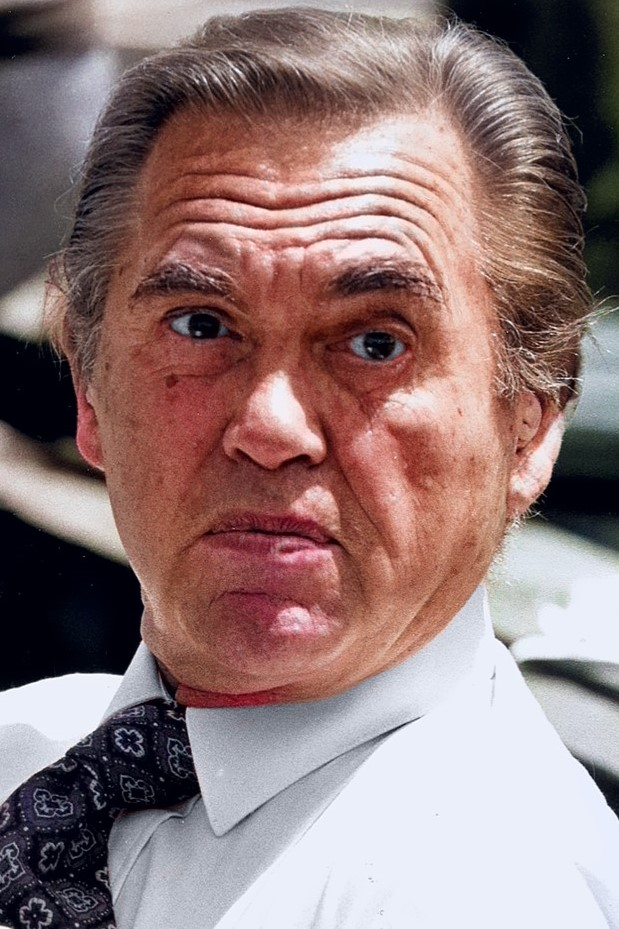

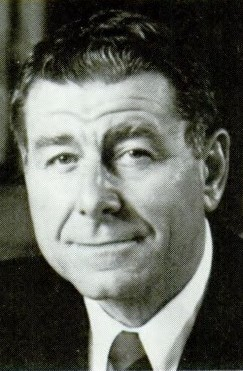
Nominee	George Wallace	Emory Folmar
Party	Democratic	Republican
Popular vote	650,538	440,815
Percentage	57.64%	39.06%
- County results Wallace: 40–50% 50–60% 60–70% 70–80% 80–90% Folmar: 40–50% 50–60%
Governor before election
Fob James
Democratic
Elected Governor
George Wallace
Democratic

The 1982 Alabama gubernatorial election was held on November 2, 1982, to elect the governor of Alabama. Incumbent Democrat Fob James declined to run for re-election; he later successfully ran again in 1994 as a Republican. The open seat election saw former Democratic governor George Wallace, who narrowly won the Democratic primary, defeat Republican Emory Folmar, the Mayor of Montgomery, Alabama.

In the Democratic primary, Wallace received challenges from Lieutenant Governor George McMillan, Speaker of the State House Joe McCorquodale, former governor Jim Folsom, and Reuben McKinley. Because Wallace did not receive a majority of the votes, he advanced to a run-off with McMillan and then narrowly won the Democratic nomination. Montgomery Mayor Emory Folmar went unchallenged for the Republican nomination.

Wallace, formerly a notorious segregationist, renounced those views in 1979. On November 2, 1982, Wallace not only won the general election, but also over 90% of the black vote. Overall, Wallace received 650,538 (57.64%) votes against Folmar's 440,815 (39.06%) votes. Folmar was the last Alabama Republican gubernatorial nominee to have never won a gubernatorial general election.

== Background ==
Incumbent governor Fob James declined to seek a second term. Shortly after former governor George Wallace survived an assassination attempt in 1972, he renounced his infamous segregationist past, especially for when he stood in front of the school house door at the University of Alabama in 1963, noting that, "I was wrong. Those days are over, and they ought to be over." With Governor James retiring, Wallace decided to run for a fourth non-consecutive term in 1982.

== Democratic primary ==
Incumbent Democratic Governor Fob James decided to not seek a second term.

=== Candidates ===
- Jim Folsom, former governor
- Joe McCorquodale, Speaker of the State House of Representatives
- Reuben McKinley
- George McMillan, lieutenant governor
- George Wallace, former governor

Primary results by county: Wallace: 30–40%; 40–50%; 50–60%; 60–70%; 70–80%; McMillan: 30–40%; 40–50%; McCorquodale: 30–40%; 50–60%

Democratic primary results
Party	Candidate	Votes	%
Democratic	George Wallace	425,469	42.53
Democratic	George McMillan	296,271	29.62
Democratic	Joe McCorquodale	250,614	25.05
Democratic	Jim Folsom	17,333	1.73
Democratic	Reuben McKinley	10,617	1.06
Total votes		1,000,304	100.00

Runoff results by county: Wallace: 50–60%; 60–70%; 70–80%; McMillan: 50–60%; 60–70%; 80–90%

Democratic runoff results
Party	Candidate	Votes	%
Democratic	George Wallace	512,203	51.19
Democratic	George McMillan	488,444	48.81
Total votes		1,000,647	100.00

== Republican primary ==
Emory M. Folmar won the Republican Party primary without any opposition.

== Election results ==
Candidate	Party	Votes	%
George Wallace	Democratic Party	650,538	57.64
Emory M. Folmar	Republican Party	440,815	39.06
Leo Suiter	Alabama Conservative	17,936	1.59
Henry Klingler	Libertarian Party	7,671	0.68
John Jackson	Alabama National Democrat	4,693	0.42
John Dyer	Prohibition Party	4,364	0.39
Martin J. Boyers	Socialist Workers	2,578	0.23
Total		1,128,595	100.00
