= Ryan deGraffenried Sr. =

American politician

Ryan DeGraffenried Sr.
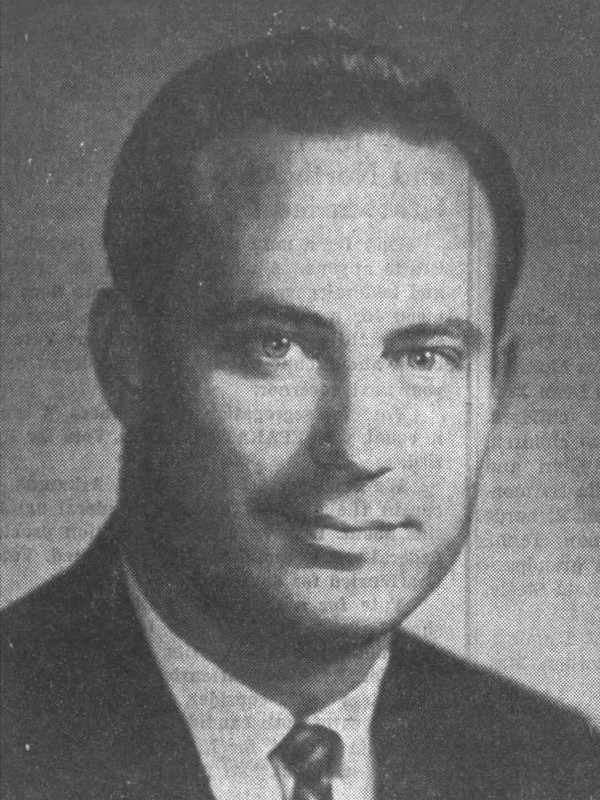

Member of the Alabama Senate from the 11th district
- In office November 1958 – November 1962
- Preceded by: E. W. Skidmore
- Succeeded by: E. W. Skidmore

Member of the Alabama House of Representatives from Tuscaloosa County
- In office November 1954 – November 1958
- Preceded by: J. P. Shelton
- Succeeded by: Arthur L. Ferguson

Personal details
- Born: William Ryan deGraffenried; April 15, 1925 Tuscaloosa, Alabama, U.S.
- Died: February 10, 1966 (aged 40) Fort Payne, Alabama, U.S.
- Party: Democratic
- Spouse: Margaret Nell Maxwell (m. 1945)
- Children: 3, including Ryan Jr.
- Parent: Edward deGraffenried (father)
- Education: University of Alabama
- Occupation: Lawyer; politician

Military service
- Branch/service: United States Army; Army Ground Forces
- Unit: 3rd Armored Division
- Battles/wars: World War II; European theater
- Awards: Purple Heart (2)

William Ryan deGraffenried Sr. (April 15, 1925 – February 10, 1966) was an American attorney and politician from Alabama.

== Early life ==
Born and raised in Tuscaloosa, Alabama, he was the son of Edward deGraffenried, former U.S. congressman from Alabama.

== Career ==
In November 1954, deGraffenried was elected to Tuscaloosa County's second place in the Alabama House of Representatives. He won the Democratic nomination in a special primary held in July after the regular Democratic primary held in May was voided after its winner J. P. Shelton died. In the subsequent election in 1958, deGraffenried moved to the Alabama Senate.

DeGraffenried ran for Governor of Alabama on two occasions (1962 and 1966). On his first attempt, he was defeated in the Democratic primary runoff by George Wallace, who was later elected Governor.

In 1966, DeGraffenried ran again as a moderate, supporting racial integration. He sought to succeed the Dixiecrat-style Wallace, who was prohibited by the constitution from running for a second consecutive term. Wallace offered his wife, Lurleen Wallace, as a surrogate candidate for governor instead. One day after qualifying for the gubernatorial race, DeGraffenried died in a plane crash while campaigning in northeast Alabama near Fort Payne. Mrs. Wallace won the nomination and gubernatorial election.

== Personal life ==
DeGraffenried married Margaret Nell Maxwell in July 1945.

His son, Ryan DeGraffenried Jr. (1950–2006), became a notable Alabama politician. He served as State Senator, Senate president pro tempore and Lieutenant Governor of Alabama under Jim Folsom Jr. (1993–1995).

== Electoral history ==
Ryan deGraffenried Sr. election results
Election	Winner			Runners-up					
Governor of Alabama
1962 prim ro	George Wallace (D)	340,730	55.87%	Ryan DeGraffenried Sr. (D)	269,122	44.13%	—		
1962 prim	George Wallace (D)	207,062	32.49%	Ryan DeGraffenried Sr. (D)	160,704	25.22%	6 others	269,507	42.30%
Alabama Senate, district 11
1958 gen	Ryan DeGraffenried Sr. (D)	5,664	100.00%	—			—		
1958 prim	Ryan DeGraffenried Sr. (D)	Unopp.		—			—		
Alabama House of Representatives, Tuscaloosa County, place 2
1954 gen	Ryan DeGraffenried Sr. (D)	6,186	100.00%	—			—		
1954 sp prim ro	Ryan DeGraffenried Sr. (D)	Unopp.		Ed Morgan (D)	Withdrawn		—		
1954 sp prim	Ryan DeGraffenried Sr. (D)	2,747	46.54%	Ed Morgan (D)	1,480	25.07%	2 others (Note: Frank Walls (D): 1,089, 18.45%; Ed Wood (D): 587, 9.94%)	1,676	28.39%
1954 prim	J. P. Shelton (D) † (Note: Died shortly after the Democratic primary.)	9,666	61.57%	Frank Walls (D)	6,034	38.43%	—		
