= Emory Folmar =

American politician (1930–2011)

Emory McCord Folmar
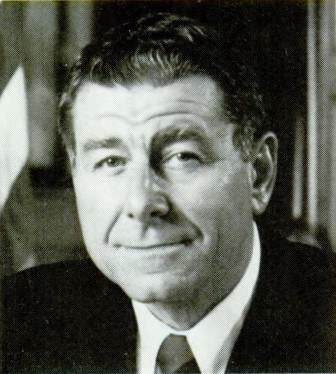
- Official portrait, c. 1984

54th Mayor of Montgomery
- In office March 3, 1977 – November 3, 1999
- Preceded by: Jim Robinson
- Succeeded by: Bobby Bright

Member of the Montgomery City Council
- In office 1975–1977

Personal details
- Born: June 3, 1930 Pike County, Alabama, U.S.
- Died: November 11, 2011 (aged 81) Montgomery, Alabama, U.S.
- Party: Republican
- Spouse: Anita Folmar
- Education: University of Alabama
- Occupation: Businessman

Military service
- Allegiance: United States
- Branch/service: United States Army
- Battles/wars: Korean War

Emory McCord Folmar (June 3, 1930 – November 11, 2011) was an American politician who served as the mayor of Montgomery, Alabama, from 1977 to 1999. Although the mayor's office is nonpartisan, Folmar was known to be a Republican.

== Background ==
Folmar was born in Pike County near Montgomery. He attended school in Pike County and then Montgomery. He was a United States Army ranger and a veteran of the Korean War. He thereafter graduated from The University of Alabama with a degree in business. He entered politics in 1975 by winning election to the Montgomery City Council. He soon became the council president. He then ascended to the mayor's office after a scandal forced the resignations of the sitting mayor and public safety director and the subsequent resignations or terminations of a number of police officers and supervisors. He remained in office from 1977 to 1999.

Although the city's elected positions are nonpartisan, Folmar was unabashedly a conservative Republican. He served as the chairman of the Alabama Republican Party and received several, primarily honorary, political appointments from Republican U.S. Presidents Ronald W. Reagan and George H. W. Bush. He was named "Civilian Aide" to the United States Secretary of the Army. The appointment carries the protocol weight of a four-star general, and Folmar took the position seriously. He even had a set of combat fatigues personalized with his name and the words "Civilian Aide" embroidered on the collar where a soldier's rank was displayed at the time.

He was defeated in 1999 by political newcomer, attorney Bobby Bright, in an election that stunned many in the community who thought Folmar's re-election likely. Bright later served one term in the United States House of Representatives from 2009 to 2011. After leaving the city limelight, Folmar went into a mobile document shredding venture before being appointed in 2003 by Governor Bob Riley to run the state Alcoholic Beverage Control Board, where he served a relatively quiet tenure as the agency's commissioner until Riley left office early in 2011. Folmar battled cancer and other health ailments in his final years before he died at the family home on the evening of November 11, 2011. On the night of Folmar's death, former Mayor Todd Strange lauded the former city leader as his mentor, inspiration, a good man, a family man, a Christian and a valuable leader of the city.

=== Entertainment ===
One notorious incident of many was his crackdown on rock-n-roll concerts in the city-owned Montgomery Civic Center --- a mass arrest of concert-goers carrying drugs, paraphernalia and minors with alcohol and beer at the facility early in his tenure set the tone for his administration, according to some. Folmar defended his actions after he had attended many concerts and witnessed personally the abuse of drugs and alcohol, particularly by minors. He noted on many occasions he saw a young girl "puking her guts out" after consuming too much vodka. Subsequently, few live rock-n-roll acts appeared in Montgomery during his tenure. The arrests were later nullified by a federal judge who rebuked Folmar's tactics. Further incidents against entertainment venues included a noise curfew against a motorsports park located about two miles away from a residential area.

Folmar was part of the city effort to relocate the Alabama Shakespeare Festival from Anniston to Montgomery, on land and money both donated by Winton "Red" Blount, a wealthy construction magnate and former U.S. Postmaster General. The Festival along with the Montgomery Museum of Fine Arts (a city facility) were located in the Winton M. Blount Cultural Park. The City of Montgomery Parks and Recreations Department maintains the grounds.

Folmar was also instrumental in pushing for the growth and development of the city's long-running street festival, Jubilee CityFest. Languishing and drifting without direction under the loose guidance of an ad hoc coalition of the community's arts and entertainment groups, Folmar said the glorified block party should grow or cease and challenged leaders to take the festival to the next level. As a result, the free "block party" was changed to a paid-admission event with multiple stages with national headline acts.

The Montgomery Zoo was another area where Folmar put resources and passion to grow the small five-acre zoo to the sprawling 40-acre facility it is today. In 1989, the zoo was expanded to its current size, enhanced with natural habitat enclosures for the animals and has regularly added new and exciting additions to the exhibits and collections.

In addition to the Alabama Shakespeare Festival, Folmar and his wife Anita P. Folmar were great private and public supporters of many of the cultural activities in the city, notably the Montgomery Symphony Orchestra, the Montgomery Ballet, the Alabama Dance Theater. The Art Council of Montgomery named its Children's Art Gallery in Anita's honor and established the Anita P. Folmar Distinguished Volunteer in the Arts Award.

Folmar was criticized by some of the city's residents that he didn't do enough to attract minor league baseball back to the city nor secure the location of a Robert Trent Jones Golf Trail facility in the city. One of the premier golf trails in the nation, the RTJ course in the area was finally located in Prattville, a nearby bedroom community. However, Folmar supporters say that this was a shrewd decision that risked no capital outlay, but allowed the city to reap the benefits of filling its abundant hotel rooms with golfers traveling to play the Trail. At the time, Montgomery's Lagoon Park Golf Course was one of America's top 50 municipal golf courses.

After the Montgomery Rebels departed in 1980, leaving the 7,000 seat Paterson Field in poor upkeep, Folmar decreed the facility and nearby Cramton Bowl would remain dedicated to amateur sports.

=== City administration and political philosophy ===
His 22 years in office marked the longest consecutive period of any mayor in the city's history although his tenure began in the wake of a racially divisive scandal. The controversy took down his predecessor, the city's public safety director and many subordinate leaders of Montgomery's Police Department. While pursuing suspects after a robbery, a police officer mistook Bernard Whitehurst for the robbery suspect when he failed to heed officer's commands to halt, and they fatally shot him in the back as he was fleeing. Then an officer at the scene planted a weapon near Whitehurst that was later determined to have been confiscated by the police in another case and filed a report saying he was shot in the front of his body. Folmar, then the president of the City Council, assumed the mayor job. In the special election that followed, Folmar beat out 40 challengers without a runoff.

A fiscal conservative, Folmar was known for the tight fist with which he held onto the city's coffers, an effective steward of the taxpayer dollars with which the city was entrusted. He was criticized for not taking as many chances for growing some areas of the community's development of entertainment and sporting venues. Although Folmar prided himself in keeping roads paved, potholes filled, water flowing and garbage collected, he was criticized at some points for not being sufficiently proactive in repairing infrastructure in poor, minority sections on the periphery of the city limits. His leadership style was unyielding and even sometimes bordered on bullying, but he was unapologetic about his leadership style, saying that his tactics were in support and furtherance of a quality life for the citizens who paid the salaries of the public servants, although he never accepted a salary while mayor. He was financially supported by family real estate and other holdings.

He often verbally tangled with vocal critics on the city council, particularly former councilman Joe Reed, a black leader who represented a decidedly minority district in the city. But Folmar also took great pleasure in jousting with former city councilman Richard Moncus, who represented a primarily white constituency in a heavily middle class section of Montgomery. Moncus became a pariah on the council, but he also had constant disagreements with another white councilman, Dr. Rick McBride. So, in 1991 Folmar put together what he called "Montgomery's Team," basically a group of hand-picked city council candidates he could entrust to help him push his policy agenda. At the polls that year, he received the solid supporting city council he wanted.

Folmar was also successful in helping to direct the city's economic development successes during his time in office, although the city's most celebrated economic development prize - Hyundai Motor Manufacturing - followed a few years after his leaving office.

Folmar often addressed the senior civic classes of area high schools during his time as mayor. On such occasions he often drew criticism for the Civic Center raid that city youth blamed on effectively killing the concert business in the city. Once Folmar answered that criticism by saying "You can stay at home and get as high as a Georgia Pine and I won't care. But when you bring it out on my streets, it becomes my business." He often characterized himself politically as "so conservative if it were up to me, I would take down all the traffic lights and let the strongest, fastest car get through the intersection first."

=== Racial issues and bigoted remarks ===
Folmar's controversial stances were cast at the outset of his political career in the 1970s in highly controversial city council votes along racial lines. Among them were the championing of a vote to spend a large portion of federal grant money on a public golf course and softball fields on the predominantly white east side of the city rather than using all of the grant money to end urban blight by providing necessary city utility infrastructure on the predominantly-black west side. Many western areas of the city are without utility infrastructure over 25 years later.

A number of incidents involving his hard-line stances include long-time racial tensions between the police and black citizens which zeroed in on Folmar's leadership as the precursor; as mayor, he was known to be the true, de facto leader of the city's police force and he routinely furthered that image by getting proactive in on-the-scene police investigations and was known to carry a pistol. He instructed police on night-watch 3rd shift to start wearing SWAT-team, military-style black uniforms and baseball-style black caps. A notorious incident happened on Todd Road in 1983, when two white police detectives, Ed Spivey and Les Brown, allegedly barged into a home where black mourners had gathered after the funeral of a grandmother. The detectives were following up on a missing person case and observed a suspicious subject outside the residence. The detectives were held hostage and beaten by the black occupants and held until other police arrived, who subsequently arrested the mourners under allegations of assault & torture of the officers, with resulting claims by local black leaders of police abuse during questioning of the suspects.

Folmar was quoted in 1997 using the word "queer" publicly in a derogatory fashion noting his disapproval of the lifestyles of gay and lesbian individuals. During Folmar's re-election bid in 1999, Samuel J. Caraway, a 19-year-old, openly gay resident of Montgomery, was beaten and jailed by two members of the Montgomery Police Department while attempting to erect a sign mocking Folmar's election slogan, "Folmar - Still The One." Caraway's sign said, "Folmar, Still A Bigot." Caraway would later cite Folmar's derogatory use of the word "queer" as an inspiration for his sign. His suit against the city resulted in a $20,000 settlement, negotiated by local attorney Julian L. McPhillips, Jr.

=== Public transportation ===
The Montgomery City Bus Transit System had a long historical past of serving the city and stepped to the forefront with the arrest of Rosa Parks in 1955 and the subsequent year-long Montgomery bus boycott thereafter, which still didn't destroy the transit system. It took a political decision by Folmar to selectively ban certain ads on buses, namely an anti-death penalty ad, to dismantle the bus system. When Folmar was told that he couldn't ban the ad as discriminatory, he banned all ads, which saw advertising revenue plummet, a large portion of the transit system's income. Within a couple of years, the traditional system of large buses and fixed routes and the historical Montgomery buses were abolished in favor of a demand system equal to a public taxi shuttle, which many citizens found unfair and troublesome for impromptu use, requiring 24-hour advance booking.

== Race for governor ==
Folmar ran unsuccessfully for governor in 1982 winning just over 40% of the vote. Folmar lost to George Wallace, who was seeking an unprecedented fourth term. The election was noted as being the first truly competitive two-party campaign in Alabama history due to strong Republican political gains on the national, state and local levels after a long history of state Democratic domination in Alabama. However, Alabama remained largely Democratic at the state level, dooming Folmar's campaign. Afterward, he served as chairman of the Alabama Republican Party from 1985 to 1989. With his high position in the party and with Ronald Reagan enjoying widespread popularity, Folmar could have sought the Republican gubernatorial nomination again in 1986, which instead went to Guy Hunt who was thought to be the Republicans' "sacrificial lamb". The Democratic side featured two strong candidates, Bill Baxley and Charles Graddick. Graddick won the primary, but the Alabama Democratic Party argued that many Republicans had crossed over and "illegally" voted for Graddick in the Democratic primary. However, Alabama had no party registration laws to restrict participation in either party primary by voters. Democratic party leaders successfully managed to have Graddick's win nullified in favor of Baxley. The resulting negative press led to a voter backlash against Democrats and Guy Hunt was subsequently elected the first Republican Alabama Governor since the post-Civil War Reconstruction period. Folmar later became state chairman for George H. W. Bush's 1988 and 1992 US presidential campaigns. He is largely credited for helping guide the Republican Party back to legitimate status in the state. Since his unsuccessful bid against Wallace and subsequent state party leadership, of the four elected governors, three have been Republicans. A second Democrat was governor during the period. Lieutenant Governor Jim Folsom, Jr. served out the remainder of Hunt's term after he was convicted of misappropriating campaign contributions. Folsom was then defeated by former governor Fob James, a Democrat turned Republican.

Political offices
Preceded by Jim Robinson	Mayor of Montgomery, Alabama; 1977–1999	Succeeded by Bobby Bright
Party political offices
Preceded by Guy Hunt	Republican Party nominee for Governor of Alabama; 1982	Succeeded by Guy Hunt
