= Alabama State Capitol =

State capitol building of the U.S. state of Alabama

- First Confederate Capitol
- U.S. National Register of Historic Places
- U.S. National Historic Landmark
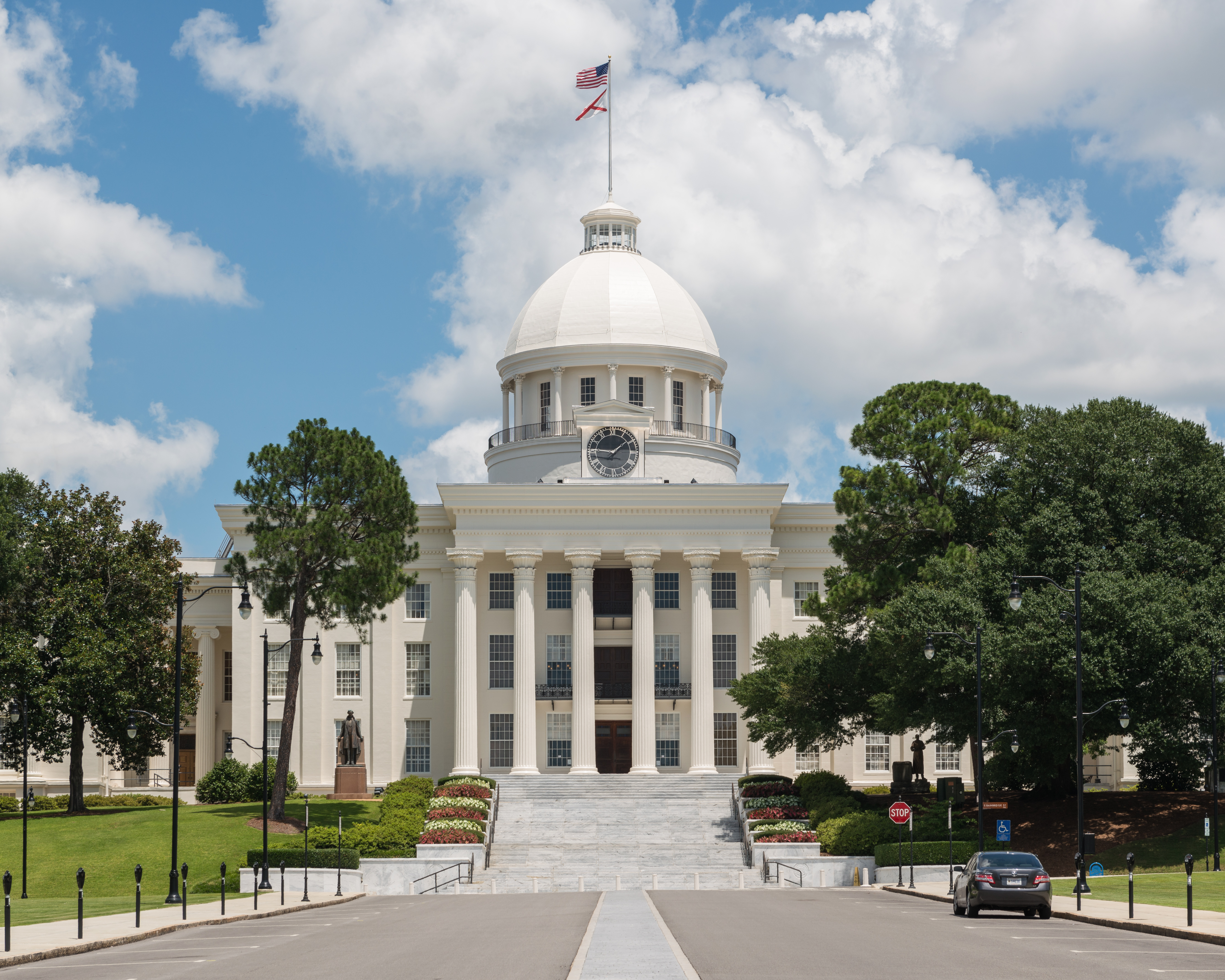
- The Alabama State Capitol in 2016

- Location within Alabama
- Interactive map of First Confederate Capitol
- Location: Montgomery, Alabama
- Coordinates: 32°22′40″N 86°18′2″W
- Built: 1851; 175 years ago
- Architectural style: Greek Revival
- NRHP reference No.: 66000152

Significant dates
- Added to NRHP: October 15, 1966
- Designated NHL: December 19, 1960

The Alabama State Capitol, listed on the National Register of Historic Places as the First Confederate Capitol, is the state capitol building for Alabama. Located on Capitol Hill, originally Goat Hill, in Montgomery, it was declared a National Historic Landmark on December 19, 1960. Unlike most other state capitols, the Alabama Legislature does not meet there, but at the Alabama State House. The Capitol has the governor's office and otherwise functions as a museum.

Alabama has had five political capitals and four purpose-built capitol buildings during its history, since it was designated as a territory of the United States. The first was the territorial capital in St. Stephens in 1817; the state organizing convention was held in Huntsville in 1819, and the first permanent capital was designated in 1820 as Cahaba. The legislature moved the capital to Tuscaloosa in 1826, where it was housed in a new three-story building. The 1826 State House in Tuscaloosa was later used as Alabama Central Female College. After it burned in 1923, the ruins were retained within Capitol Park.

Finally, in 1846, the state legislature moved the capital to Montgomery. The new capitol building in Montgomery, which was located where the current building stands, burned after two years. The current building was completed in 1851, and additional wings were added over the course of the following 140 years. These changes followed population growth in the state from natural growth and immigration as many European-American settlers arrived, who were often slave-holders. Large parts of the state were subsequently developed for cotton cultivation.

The current capitol building temporarily served as the Confederate Capitol while Montgomery served as the first political capital of the Confederate States of America in 1861, before Richmond, Virginia was designated as the capital. Delegates meeting as the Montgomery Convention in the Senate Chamber drew up the Provisional Constitution of the Confederate States on February 4, 1861. The convention also adopted the Permanent Constitution here on March 11, 1861.

== Description ==
Architecturally, the building is Greek Revival in style with some Beaux-Arts influences. The central core of the building and the east wing to the structure's rear, is three stories built over a below-grade basement. The north and south wings are two-stories over a raised basement. The current front facade is approximately 350 feet (110 m) wide and 119 feet (36 m) tall from ground level to the top of the lantern on the dome.

== History ==
=== First Alabama State Capitol in Montgomery ===
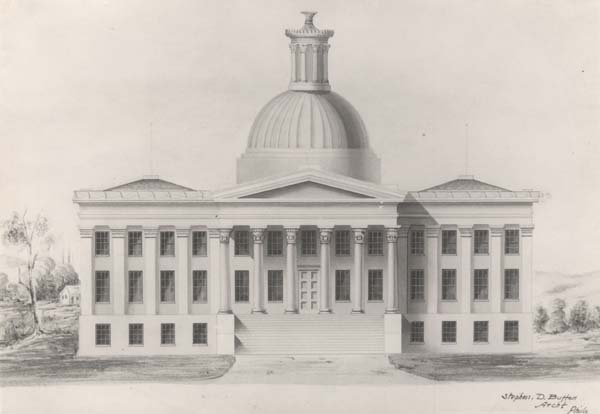
The first Montgomery capitol building, destroyed by fire in 1849.

The first capitol building to be built in Montgomery was designed by Stephen Decatur Button (1813-1897), of Philadelphia, Pennsylvania. Andrew Dexter Jr. (1779-1837), one of Montgomery's town founders and influential in the history of Alabama, kept a prime piece of property empty in anticipation of the capital city eventually being moved to Montgomery from Tuscaloosa. This property, atop what was then known as Goat Hill due to its use as a pasture, was chosen as the site for the new state capitol structure. Construction began in 1846, with the new completed building presented to the state on December 6, 1847. Button credited much of his architectural inspiration to Minard Lafever's publication Beauties of Modern Architecture.

Button's designed building was stuccoed brick, with two full stories set over a rusticated raised basement. A two-story monumental portico with six Composite columns, topped by a broad pediment, was centered on the middle five bays of the front elevation. A central dome, 40 feet (12 m) in diameter, sat directly on a supporting ring at the main roof level behind the portico. The small dome was crowned with an elaborate Cupola lantern on top patterned after the Choragic Monument of Lysicrates. This first capitol building unfortunately burned on December 14, 1849, little more than two years after its completion. The ruins were cleared by March 1850, with a new replacement building soon to follow.

=== Second (Current) Alabama State Capitol in Montgomery ===
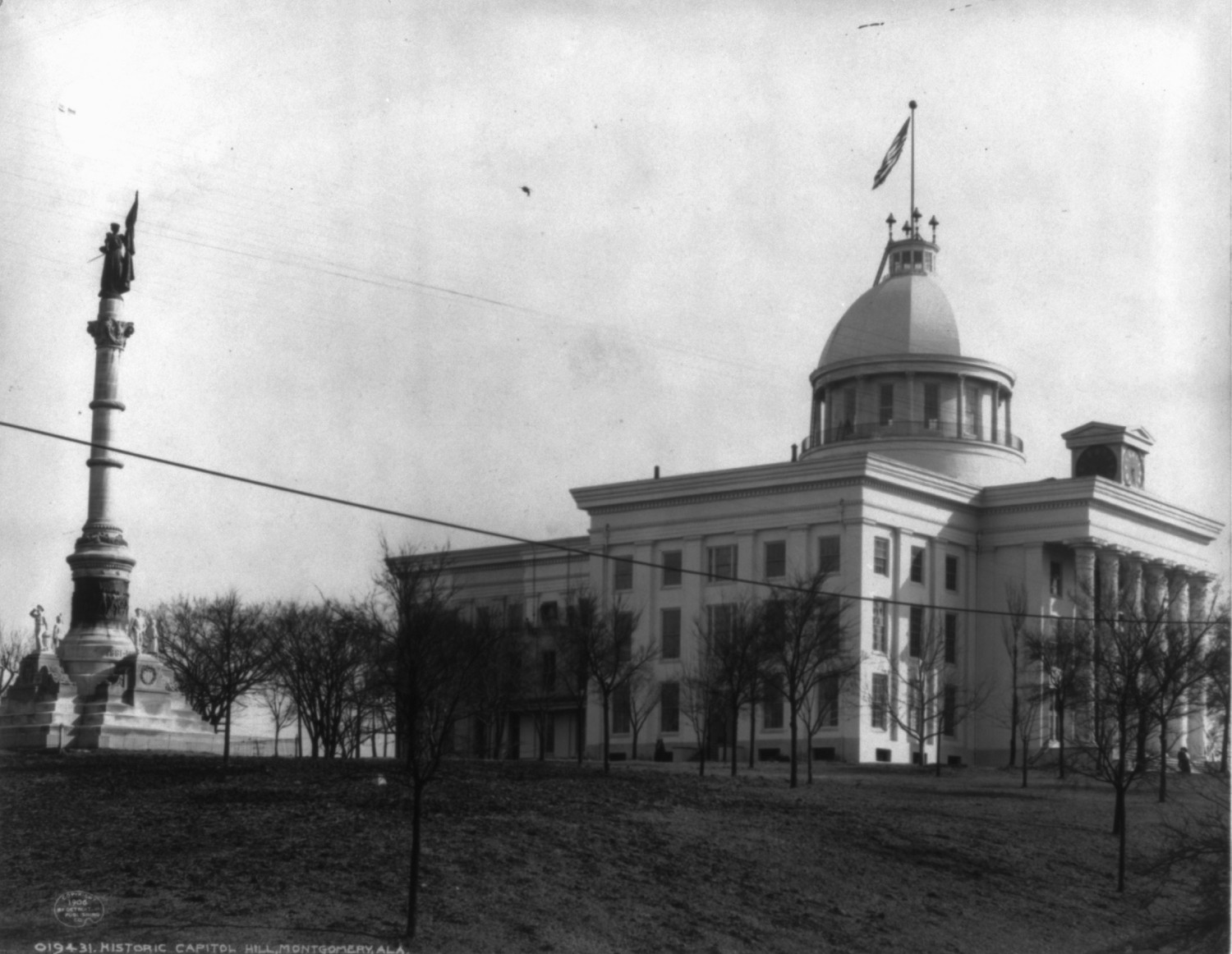
The Alabama State Capitol building and with adjacent Confederate Monument on the surrounding Capitol lawn / grounds, prior to erection of the twin north and south side-wings with expanded chambers and offices for the Senate and the House of Representatives in 1906-1907 and 1911-1912. - (photograph taken c.1906)

The current Alabama State Capitol is the sixth State House or Capitol structure in the history of Alabama and the second to be built in the current state capital city of Montgomery. It was built from 1850 to 1851, with Barachias Holt as supervising architect and construction superintendent. Holt, originally from Exeter, Maine, in New England was a master craftsman / mechanic by trade. Following his work on the second Alabama State Capitol in Montgomery, he created a successful sash window, door, and window blinds manufacturing factory in Montgomery.

The new building used the original remaining brick foundations and general layout of Button's previous structure, with modifications by Holt. The modifications included a taller full three-story building over a basement and a three-story front portico with prominent distinctive “Tower of the Winds Corinthian” columns, which had no pediment in this iteration. Holt's dome was a departure from the previous capitol work also; his wood and cast iron dome was supported on a ring of Corinthian columns and topped with a simple twelve-sided small glazed glass windows in the top lantern. John P. Figh and James D. Randolph were the principal construction contractors. Figh had previously completed extensive brickwork on the William Nichols-designed campus lay-out of buildings for the new University of Alabama at Tuscaloosa. Randolph was also in charge of the carpentry work, which was likely accomplished by subcontractors. Nimrod E. Benson and Judson Wyman were the building supervisors.

The new Capitol building was first occupied by both chambers of the Alabama Legislature on October 1, 1851. The clock over the portico was installed four months later in February 1852. The clock, along with a bell, was purchased by the City of Montgomery and presented to the state in 1852. In proportion to the capitol building, the clock appears as a square white box with black dials and crowned with a gabled roof. The dials are 10 feet (3.0 m) in diameter with 4-foot (1.2 m) minute hands and a 3-foot (0.91 m) hour hands. It has been criticized as architecturally inappropriate on various occasions since its initial installation.

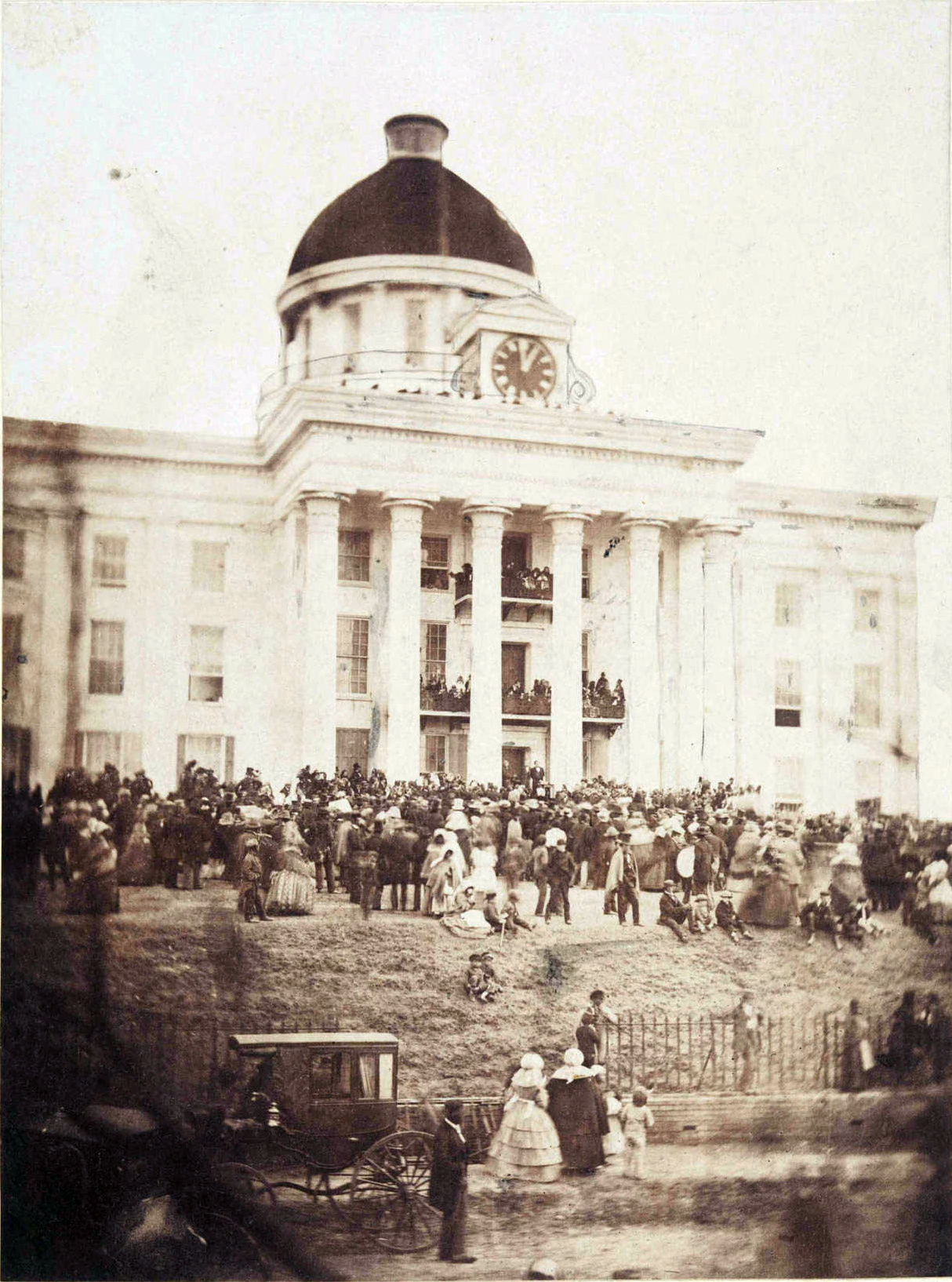
Early rare daguerreotype of crowd gathered at the First Inauguration of Jefferson Davis (1808-1889, served 1861-1865), as provisional President of the Confederate States of America on the steps and under the portico of the second Alabama State Capitol (built 1850-1851) in Montgomery, Alabama, following the organizing sessions of the Provisional Confederate States Congress, on February 18, 1861. Beginnings of the American Civil War (1861-1865), the following April.

With the secession of Alabama and six other Deep South states and subsequent formation of the Confederacy in February 1861, the building served as its first capitol until May 22, 1861. A commemorative brass marker in the shape of a six-pointed star is set into the marble floor of the front portico at the precise location where Jefferson Davis stood on February 18, 1861, to take his oath of office as the only President of the Confederate States of America.

In 1901, delegates met at the Capitol to draft a new revision of the Constitution of Alabama. Convention chair John B. Knox said they were there to end "the menace of negro domination." The new constitution enshrined "White Supremacy by Law" and consolidated and centralized power at the Capitol and away from local county and town governments.

In 1961 Governor John Patterson flew a seven-starred version of the former "Stars and Bars" over the capitol for several days in celebration of the centennial of the American Civil War. His successor, the 45th Governor George C. Wallace (1919-1998, served three non-consecutive terms: 1963-1967, 1971-1979, 1983-1987), attracted national attention, by raising the rebel Confederate Battle Flag of 1863 over the Capitol dome on April 25, 1963, as a symbol of defiance to the federal government; this was the date of his meeting with visiting United States Attorney General Robert F. Kennedy (1925-1968, served 1961-1963), (the younger brother of the 35th President John F. Kennedy back in the White House in Washington, D.C.) to discuss the racial desegregation of the University of Alabama at Tuscaloosa, in the ongoing national civil rights movement and social struggle since the mid-1950s.

The flag continued to be flown over the State Capitol for almost 30 more years. Several African American legislators and members of the state chapter of the NAACP were arrested in 1988 after attempting to remove the flag. In 1991 the flag was removed during renovations to the dome, and its return was barred by a 1993 state court decision. It ruled that an 1895 state statute allows only the national and state flags to be flown over the capitol building.

The building served as home to the Alabama Legislature until 1985, when it moved to the new Alabama State House. Officially, this move was temporary, since the Alabama Constitution requires that the Legislature meet in the capitol. In 1984, a constitutional amendment was passed that allowed the Legislature to move to another building if the capitol were to be renovated. The renovation started in 1985 and was completed in 1992 by the architecture group Holmes and Holmes. When the capitol was reopened, the Governor of Alabama and numerous other state offices moved back into the building, but the legislature remained at the State House.

On May 7, 2009, the legislature reconvened in the capitol building for the first time since September 20, 1985, due to flooding in the State House. This required some adapting, as the capitol did not have desks in the House chamber, and those in the Senate chamber were 1861 replicas. Neither chamber has a computerized voting system. The capitol building's heating and air conditioning is supplied from the State House. Because the electricity had been turned off in the State House due to the flooding, there was no air conditioning in the capitol.

== The building ==
=== The exterior ===
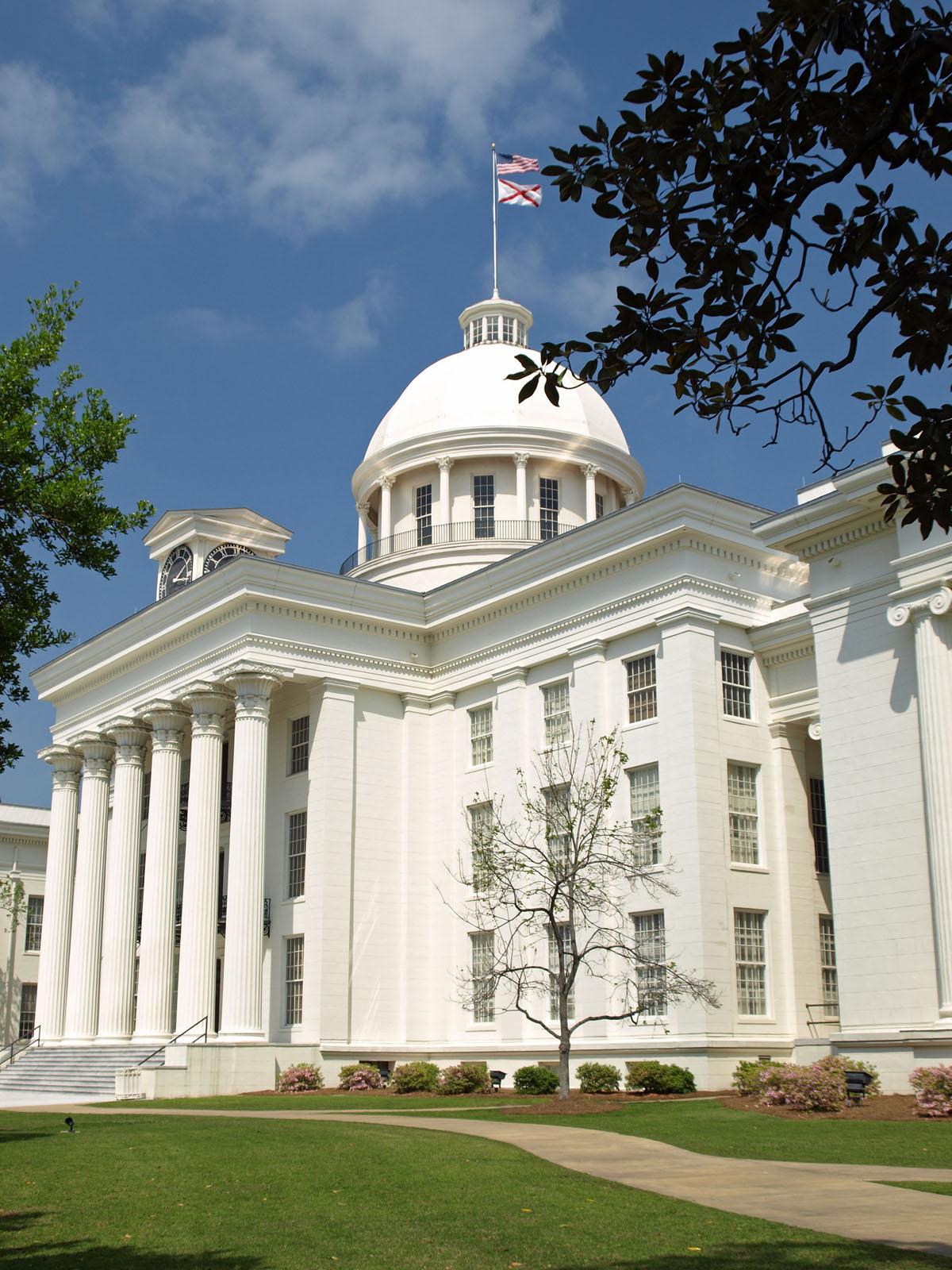
Pictured view of the historic original West Front portico with steps, and dome with top cupola of 1850-1851 of the Alabama State Capitol, in the state capital city of Montgomery, Alabama, with a portion visible of the 1906 south wing (at right), Built of Greek Revival style of architecture, designed by Barachias Holt, - (color photo taken April 2009).

The original core of the 1850-1851 building, as well as the subsequent additions of 1885, 1906, 1912, and extensive 1985-1992 renovations project, is essentially Greek Revival architecture in style. The original 1850-1851 three-story core of the building features bays delineated by Doric pilasters and a monumental three-story hexastyle portico utilizing the Composite order. The original core of the building is 150 by 70 feet (46 m × 21 m), with an original central rear judiciary wing measuring 40 by 50 feet (12 m × 15 m). The first extension to the rear added another 70 by 50 feet (21 m × 15 m). Each side-wing is 100 by 92 feet (30 m × 28 m).

The additions started with an extension to the east / rear wing on the building's rear facade (East Front) in 1885. Then a south wing with more elaborate Beaux-Arts architecture (Classical Revival) styles of influences was added in 1906. A close externally identical north wing on the opposite side was completed six years later in 1912. These two matching side-wings were designed by Montgomery architect Frank Lockwood, in consultation with Charles Follen McKim of the famous architectural firm McKim, Mead & White of New York City. The symmetrical north and south side-wings with newer enlarged legislative chambers for the two houses of the Alabama Senate and the Alabama House of Representatives in the bicameral body of the Alabama State Legislature. Each wing were each joined to the 1851 structure with a narrow hyphen connecting structure. Each hyphen features a recessed two-story Greek Ionic style portico on the west facade. Both of the adjoining side-wings for the Senate and House feature two-story hexastyle Ionic entrance porticoes on their north and south elevations, respectively. The west and east facades of these wings also feature decorative two-story hexastyle pseudo-porticoes with engaged Ionic columns. A new east wing addition with a new three-story tetrastyle portico was built during the 1985–1992 restoration / renovation project.. The new portico includes columns that match the Composite order of the original West Front main entrance portico on the 1851 west side elevation.

=== The interior ===
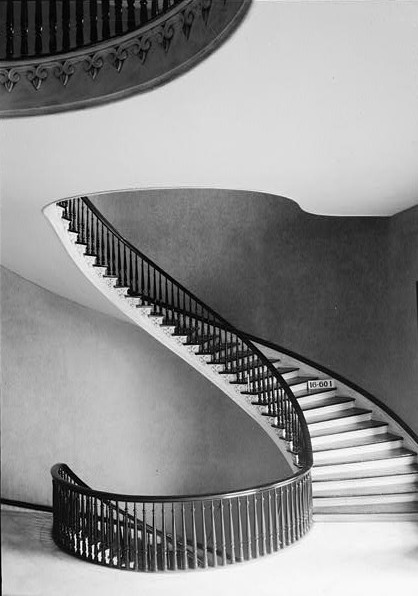
View on second floor of one of the cantilevered spiral staircases designed by Horace King.

Upon entering the ground floor of the capitol building, one enters the main stair-hall. It is the location of cantilevered stairways that spiral up to the third floor. The twin cantilevered spiral staircases are among the building's finest original architectural features. They were designed and built by architect Horace King, a former slave who was freed in 1846. Due to his renown in Alabama and surrounding states as a bridge builder, the Alabama Legislature passed a special law that exempted him from the state's manumission laws, which normally required that any freed slaves leave the state within one year of gaining their freedom. During the post-war Reconstruction Era he later was elected and served two terms in the Alabama House of Representatives, in the building that he had helped to design and build two decades before.

Immediately east of the stair-hall is the ground floor of the rotunda. The ground floor of the rotunda, not physically open to the upper rotunda floors, contains the memorial sculpture Lurleen Burns Wallace (1968) by F. R. Schoenfeld. Wallace was Alabama's first female governor and died while in office in 1968. From there, hallways leading to offices branch off into the north and south wings. The next major room on the ground floor is the old Supreme Court Chamber, part of the original capitol plan. Located in the east (rear) wing, it is the only portion of the wing dating back to 1851. It is a large rectangular room, one story high, with a concave entry wall and two robust Ionic columns visually dividing the space near the center of the room. Later east wing expansions continue on eastward from this room.

The second floor is accessed via the main stairhall. From there the open rotunda is accessed to the east. The rotunda leads to the east wing offices, the old Senate Chamber to the north and the old House of Representatives Chamber to the south.

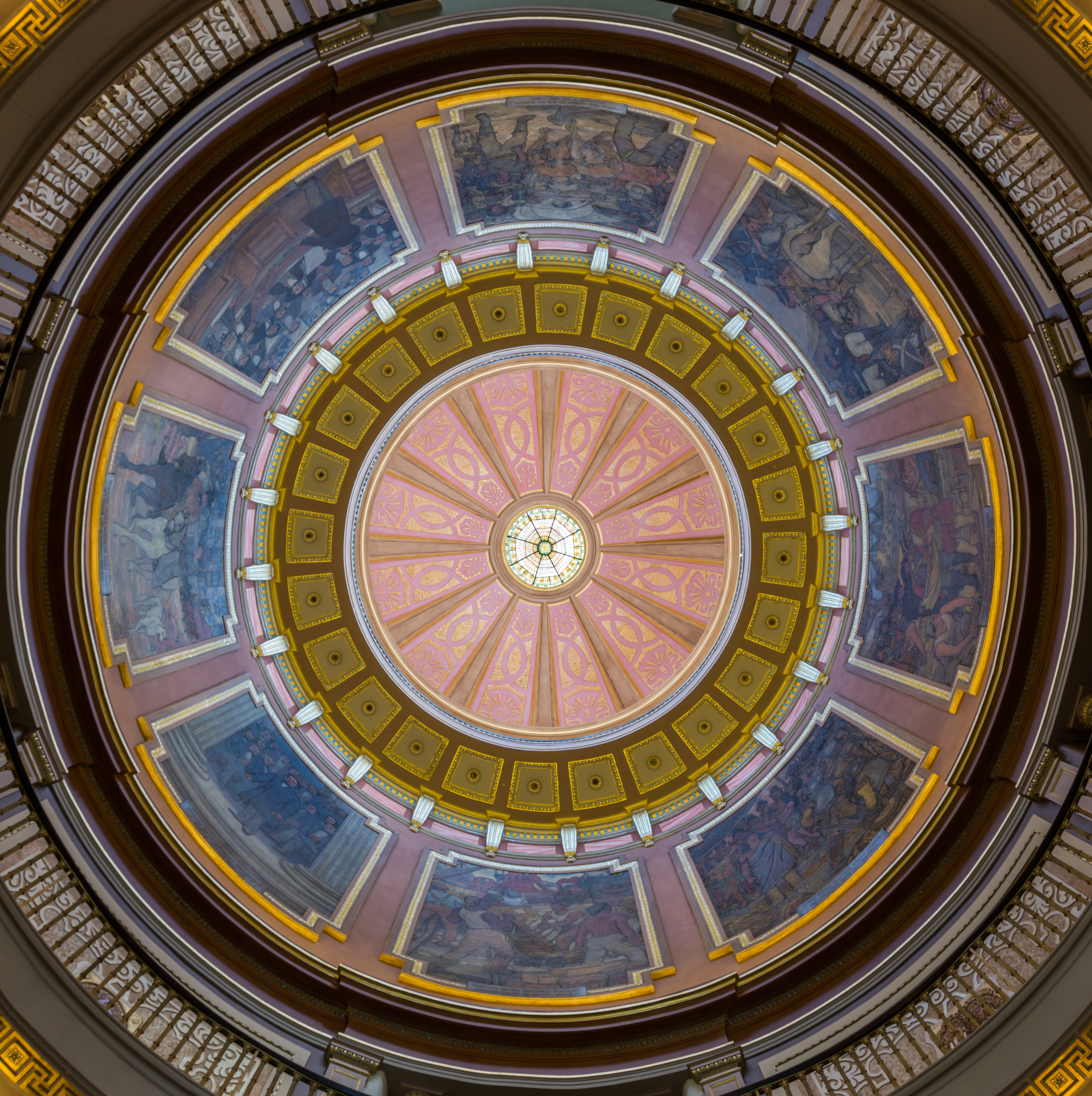
The dome interior as seen from the floor of the rotunda.

The interior of the Capitol building is centered on the axial rotunda, which is topped by a large dome. The rotunda is open from the second floor and through the third floor to the top of the dome. The dome interior is decorated with eight painted murals by Roderick MacKenzie, a Scottish-born artist who relocated from the British Isles / United Kingdom to the American South and Alabama. The murals illustrate MacKenzie's artistic interpretation of the history of Alabama as he read and learned about it. They were executed on canvas, painted from 1926 to 1930 at his Mobile studio and then shipped to Montgomery by railroad for installation in July 1930.

The murals depict the hostile meeting of Hernando de Soto and Tuskaloosa in 1540, the establishment of the colonial French capital of Mobile by Pierre Le Moyne d'Iberville and Jean-Baptiste Le Moyne, Sieur de Bienville from 1702 to 1711, the surrender of William Weatherford to Andrew Jackson in 1814, pioneers settling the Alabama wilderness in 1816, the drafting of the Constitution of Alabama in 1818, wealth and leisure during the antebellum era from 1840 to 1860, the inauguration of Confederate President Jefferson Davis on the capitol steps in 1861, and, finally, prosperity following the development of resources from 1874 to 1930.

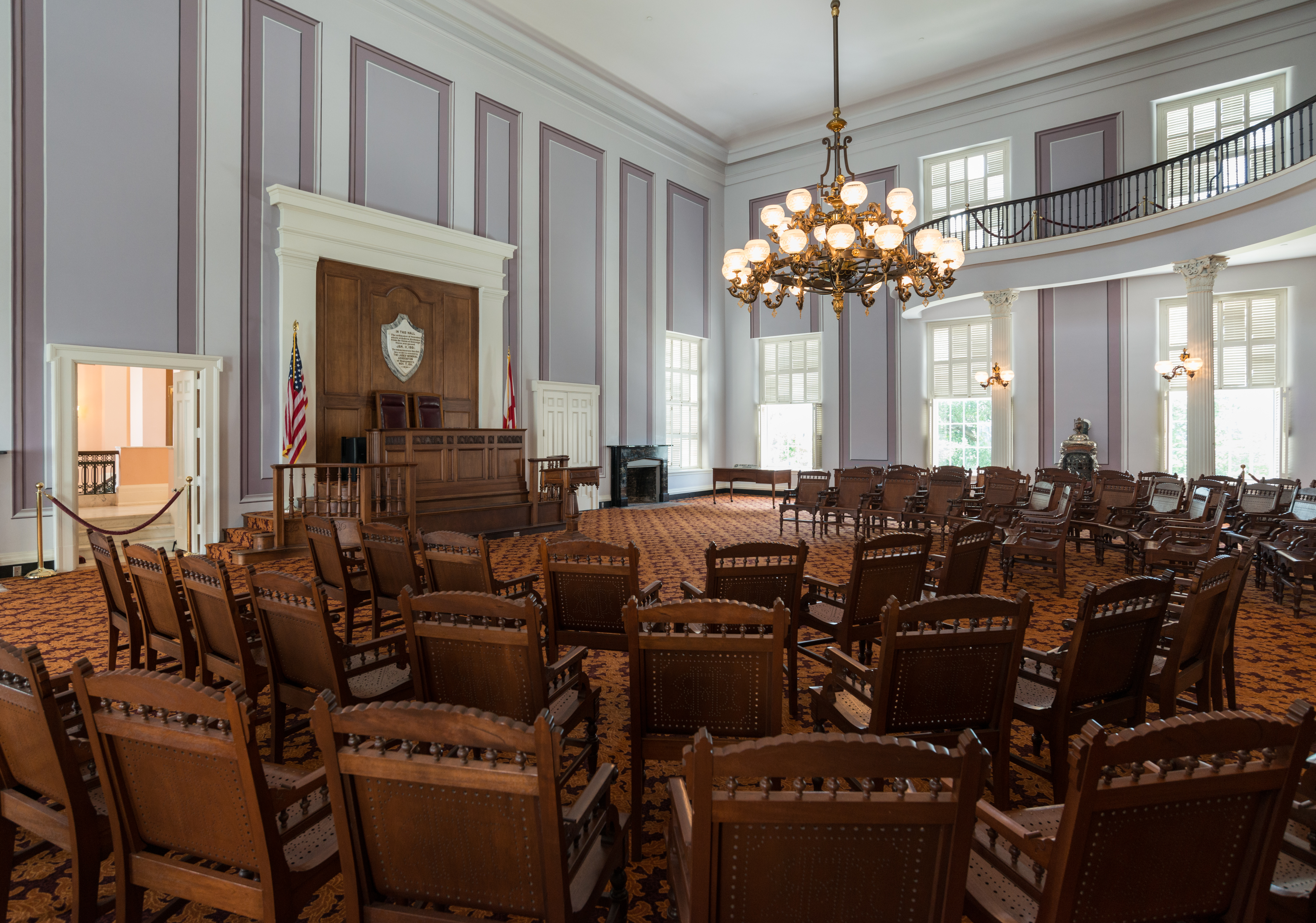
The restored House Chamber in 2016.

Both legislative chambers date to the original 1851 construction. Both of them are rectangular in shape and extend upward through the third floor, with a mezzanine gallery on that level. The galleries in both chambers are supported by Corinthian columns. Those in the old Senate Chamber are gilded, while those in the old House of Representatives Chamber are simply painted. The old Senate Chamber is the smaller of the two legislative chambers, with a mezzanine in a circular pattern stretching around all four sides of the room, broken only above lectern platform. The old House Chamber is larger, with a curvilinear mezzanine on three walls that merges into each side wall before reaching the lectern platform wall.

The Old Senate Chamber was the site of several events leading to the Civil War. The Alabama Secession Convention met here on January 11, 1861, and voted to withdraw from the Union. Then, the Confederate States of America was organized here via a provisional constitution on February 4, 1861, Jefferson Davis was elected as its first president on February 9, 1861, and finally the permanent Confederate constitution brought into effect on March 11, 1861.

== The grounds ==
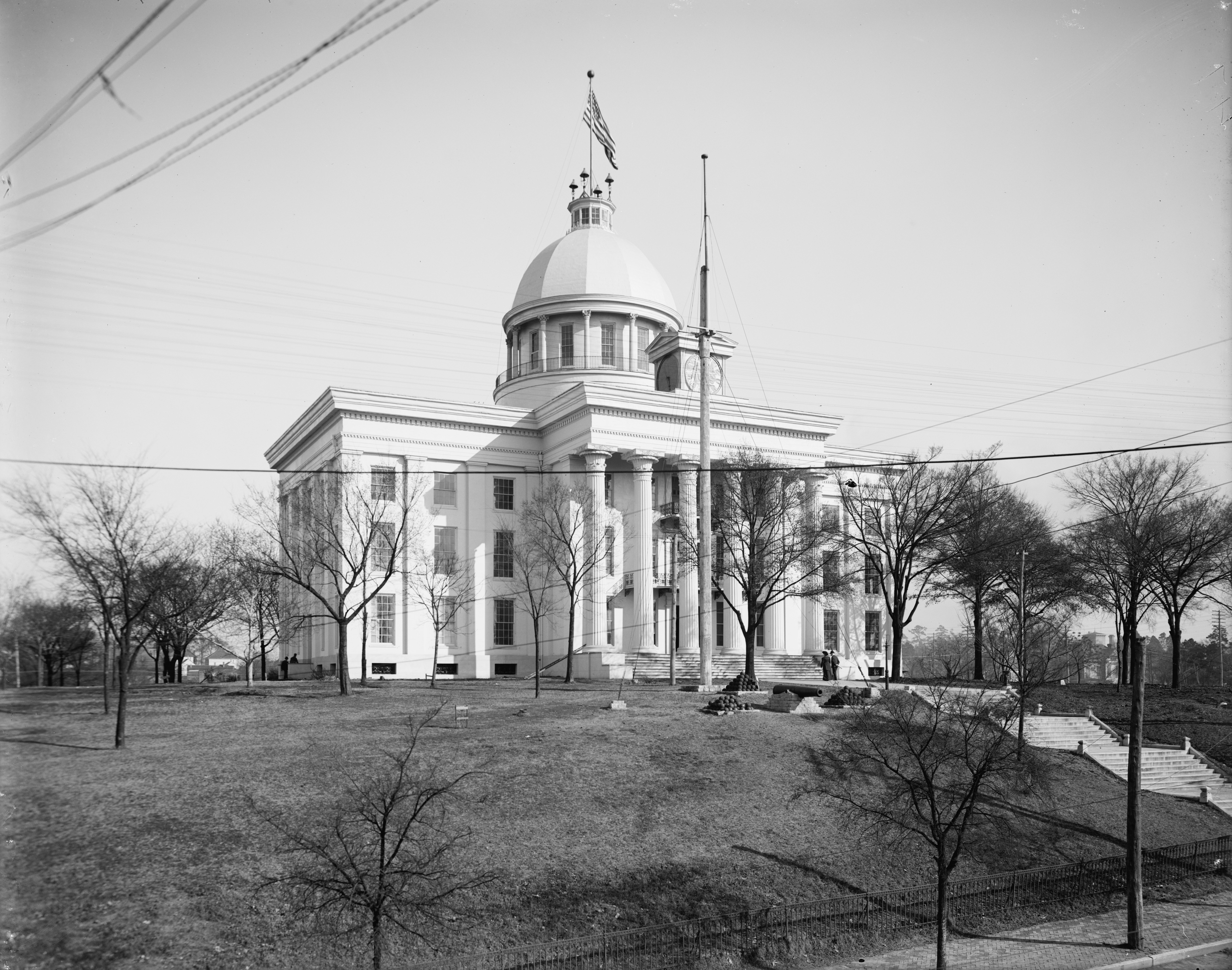
The capitol building in 1906. Note the original steps leading up to the portico and the iron fence.

The landscape plan for Capitol Hill surrounding the capitol building was originally designed by the firm of Frederick Law Olmsted in 1889. The grounds of Capitol Hill were surrounded by a cast iron fence from the 19th century into the first decades of the 20th. It was later removed and reused to enclose the Old Augusta Cemetery on Wares Ferry Road. The grounds still contain many trees and scrubs from the Olmsted design, in addition to numerous monuments. Other major features of the grounds include the marble steps leading to the front portico, the Confederate Memorial Monument and the Avenue of Flags. Statuary on the capitol grounds includes Albert Patterson (1961), depicting an assassinated attorney; Duty Called (1986) by Branko Medenica; James Marion Sims (1939) by Biancio Melarango, depicting a gynecologist who experimented on enslaved black women without anesthesia; Jefferson Davis (1940) by Frederick Cleveland Hibbard, depicting the president of the Confederacy; John Allan Wyeth (1920s) by Gutzon Borglum; and Joseph Lister Hill (1969) by Gualberto Rocchi, depicting a senator. These statues are protected by the Alabama Memorial Preservation Act.

=== The main steps ===
The principal access to the capitol building was originally via a long flight of steps leading to the front portico. These were much narrower than those in place today. They were replaced by new steps fabricated from Georgia marble in 1949. The modern steps are the same width as the portico and are edged with raised marble planters.

It was here that the third Selma to Montgomery march ended on March 25, 1965, with 25,000 protesters at the foot of the capitol steps on Dexter Avenue. Prominent protesters included Martin Luther King Jr., Ralph Abernathy, Coretta Scott King, Ralph Bunche, Roy Wilkins, Whitney Young, A. Philip Randolph, Bayard Rustin, John Lewis, James Baldwin, Harry Belafonte, and Joan Baez. A delegation from the protestors attempted to see Governor George Wallace to give him a petition that asked for an end to racial discrimination in Alabama. The governor had sent word that he would see the delegation, but they were denied entry to the capitol grounds twice and told no one would be let through. State police surrounded the capitol and prevented the marchers' delegation entry to the grounds. Martin Luther King Jr. then gave an impassioned speech at the base of the steps:

We are not about to turn around. We are on the move now. Yes, we are on the move and no wave of racism can stop us.

— Martin Luther King Jr.

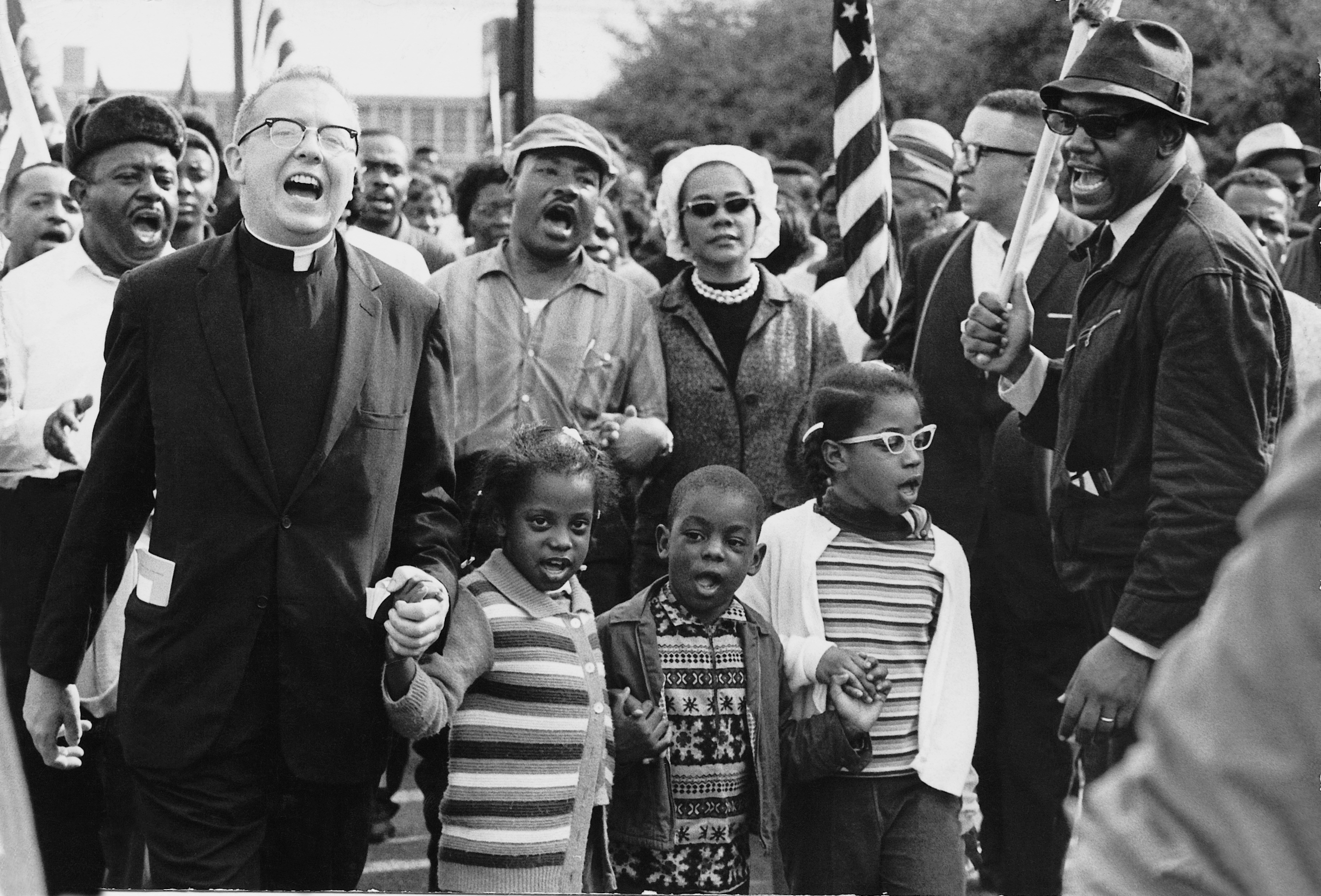
The 1965 Selma to Montgomery marchers, including Ralph Abernathy, James Reeb, Martin Luther King Jr., Coretta Scott King, and Abernathy's three children, arrive in Montgomery.

The delegation was later let through into the capitol, but were told that Wallace's office was closed for the day. The delegation later left, without having been able to give their petition to anyone. It read:

We have come not only five days and fifty miles but we have come from three centuries of suffering and hardship. We have come to you, the Governor of Alabama, to declare that we must have our freedom now. We must have the right to vote; we must have equal protection of the law and an end to police brutality.

— Selma to Montgomery marchers petition

These steps remain as they were in 1965, although repairs were made during the 1992 renovation of the building. The steps have continued to be the rallying point for civil demonstrations over the succeeding years. Memorial Selma to Montgomery marches have ended at the steps on several occasions. The most recent, in honor of what would have been King's 83rd birthday, was held on January 15, 2012. On this occasion the marchers were greeted by Governor Robert J. Bentley.

The steps have seen protests by LGBT groups and immigration groups in recent years as well. The annual Vigil for Victims of Hate and Violence, sponsored by Equality Alabama, took place on the capitol steps on February 20, 2011, to heighten awareness of the lack of hate crime legislation to protect LGBT people in the state. Hundreds of protesters converged at the steps on December 17, 2011, to protest the passage of Alabama's strict new immigration law, Alabama HB 56.

=== Avenue of Flags ===
The Avenue of Flags is another major feature of the Alabama State Capitol grounds. It is a grouping of the flags of the U.S. states, with a native stone from each state, engraved with its name, set at the base of each flagpole. The flagpoles are arranged in a semi-circle between the Ionic portico of the capitol building's south wing and Washington Avenue. It was completed during the term of Governor Albert Brewer, being officially dedicated on April 6, 1968.

== Tourism ==
The areas that are open for tourists are the entry stairhall, the old Governor's Office, the old State Supreme Court, the old Supreme Court Library, the rotunda, the old House of Representatives, and the old Senate Chamber. Its buildings and grounds are maintained by the Alabama Historical Commission.

== See also ==
- List of National Historic Landmarks in Alabama
- First White House of the Confederacy, across the street from the capitol building
- Virginia State Capitol, second and last capitol building of the Confederacy
- List of state and territorial capitols in the United States
