= List of Alabama state legislatures =

The legislature of the U.S. state of Alabama has convened many times since statehood became effective on December 14, 1819.

== Legislatures ==
Name	Session	Start date	End date	Last election
Alabama Constitution of 1819
	1819	October 1819	December 1819	
		November 9, 1880	1881	
		November 15, 1898	February 23, 1899	
Alabama Constitution of 1901
1902-1906 Alabama Legislature				November 1902
1906-1910 Alabama Legislature		January 1907		November 1906
1910-1914 Alabama Legislature				November 1910
1914-1918 Alabama Legislature				November 1914
1918-1922 Alabama Legislature				November 1918
1922-1926 Alabama Legislature				November 1922
1926-1930 Alabama Legislature				November 1926
1930-1934 Alabama Legislature				November 1930
1934-1938 Alabama Legislature				November 1934
1938-1942 Alabama Legislature				November 1938
1942-1946 Alabama Legislature				November 1942
1946-1950 Alabama Legislature				November 1946
1950-1954 Alabama Legislature				November 1950
1954-1958 Alabama Legislature				November 1954
1958-1962 Alabama Legislature	1959	May 5, 1959	November 12, 1959	November 1958
	1959	February 3, 1959	February 20, 1959	
	1959	June 24, 1959	August 24, 1959	
1962-1966 Alabama Legislature				November 1962
1966-1970 Alabama Legislature				November 1966
1970-1974 Alabama Legislature				November 1970
1974-1978 Alabama Legislature				November 1974
1978-1982 Alabama Legislature				November 1978
1982-1986 Alabama Legislature				November 1982
1986-1990 Alabama Legislature				November 1986
1990-1994 Alabama Legislature				November 1990
1994-1998 Alabama Legislature	1998	January 1, 1998	April 27, 1998	November 1994
1998-2002 Alabama Legislature	1999	March 2, 1999	June 9, 1999	November 1998
	2000	February 1, 2000	May 15, 2000	
	2001	February 6, 2001	May 21, 2001	
2002-2006 Alabama Legislature	2003	January 3, 2003	June 16, 2003	November 2002
	2005	February 1, 2005	May 16, 2005	
2006-2010 Alabama Legislature	2010	January 12, 2010	April 22, 2010	November 2006
2010-2014 Alabama Legislature	2012	February 7, 2012	May 16, 2012	November 2010: House, Senate
	2014	January 14, 2014	April 3, 2014	November 2010
2014-2018 Alabama Legislature	2015	March 3, 2015	June 4, 2015	November 2014: Senate
	2016	February 2, 2016	May 4, 2016	November 2014
	2018	January 9, 2018	March 29, 2018	November 2014
2018-2022 Alabama Legislature	2019	March 5, 2019	June 18, 2019	November 2018: House, Senate
	2020	February 4, 2020	May 18, 2020	November 2018
	2021	February 2, 2021	May 17, 2021	November 2018
	2022	January 11, 2022	April 7, 2022	November 2018
Alabama Constitution of 2022
2022-2026 Alabama Legislature	2023	March 7, 2023		November 8, 2022: House, Senate

== Images ==
Images related to the Alabama Legislature
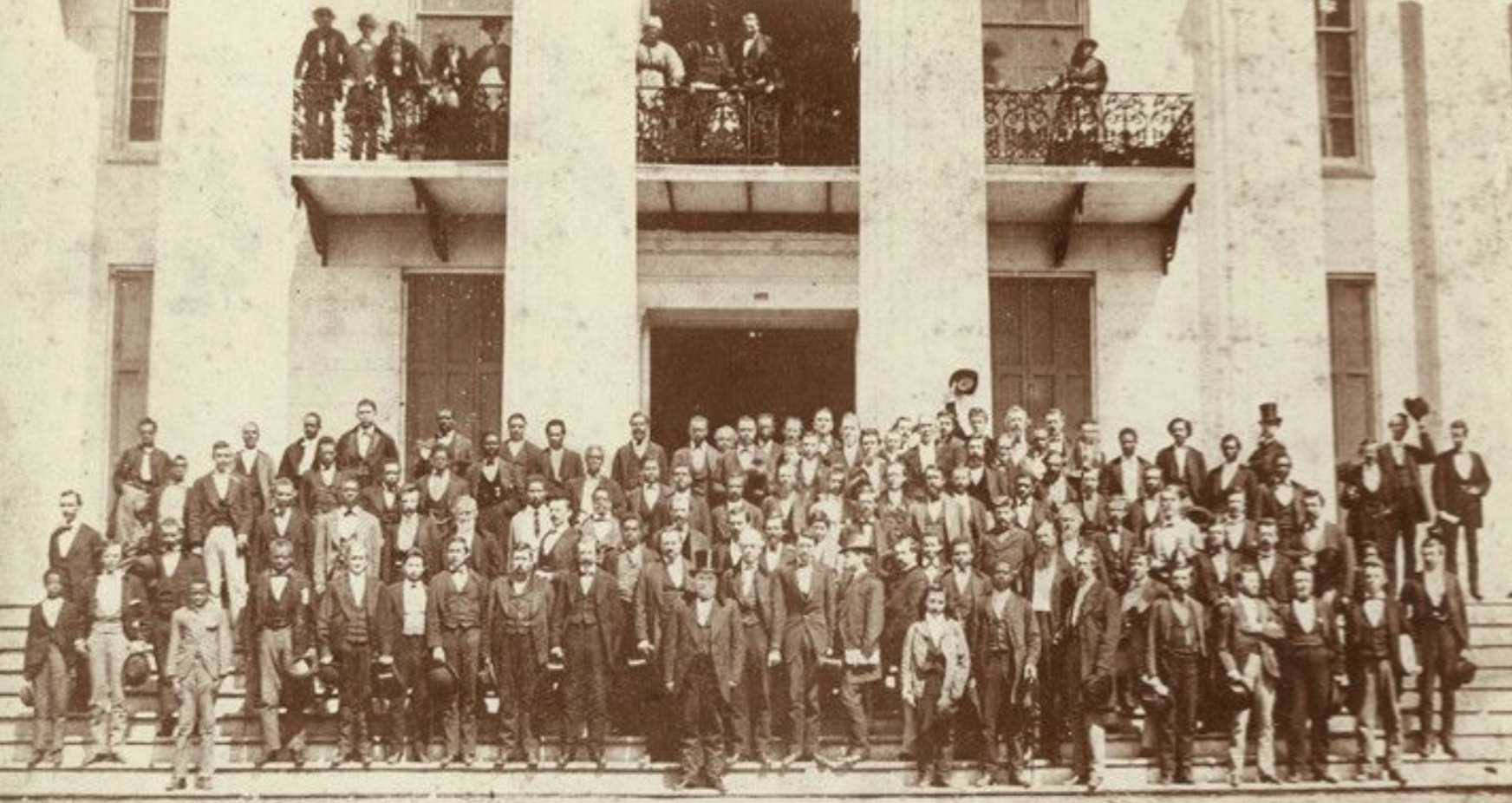
1872 Alabama Legislature

== See also ==
- List of governors of Alabama
- List of lieutenant governors of Alabama
- Politics of Alabama
- Elections in Alabama
- Alabama State House
- Historical outline of Alabama
- Lists of United States state legislative sessions
