= Impeachment in Alabama =

The constitution of the U.S. state of Alabama grants its legislature the ability to impeach and remove certain officials. An impeachment vote in the Alabama House of Representatives is followed by an impeachment trial in the Alabama Senate through which an official can be removed from office if convicted.

== State impeachment law ==
=== Officials subject to impeachment ===
- Governor
- Lieutenant governor
- Attorney general
- State auditor
- Secretary of state
- State treasurer
- Commissioner of agriculture and industries
- Justices of the Supreme Court
- Appellate court judges
- Members of the Board of Education
- County officers
- Officers of incorporated cities and towns
- Trustees of the Alabama Trust Fund

There are officials that may be removed from office for similar reasons by court order instead of impeachment.

=== Grounds for impeachment ===
The grounds for impeachment specified in the state's constitution are:

Willful neglect of duty, corruption in office, incompetency, or intemperance in the use of intoxicating liquors or narcotics to such an extent, in view of the dignity of the office and importance of its duties, as unfits the officer for the discharge of such duties for any offense involving moral turpitude while in office, or committed under color thereof, or connected therewith.

Additionally, the constitution states that "dissatisfaction with the ruling of a judge or justice shall not be a ground upon which impeachment...may proceed." The constitution also states that for judges and justices,

A finding of lack of probable cause or a termination of proceeding without a finding of wrongdoing by either the Judicial Inquiry Commission or Court of the Judiciary shall constitute a complete defense to proceedings of impeachment...and shall bar all further proceedings of impeachment as to the same charge or subject matter.

Per the constitution, any "charge or subject matter" against a judges and justices that has been tried before the state's Court of the Judiciary cannot be a grounds for an impeachment.

=== Punishment upon conviction ===
The punishment upon conviction in an impeachment trial is "removal from office, and disqualifications from holding office, under the authority of this state, for the term for which the officer was elected or appointed".

An official is still separately liable for criminal indictment under the law.

=== Impeachment procedure ===
==== Constitutional rules ====
The Alabama Constitution makes limited specifications about the impeachment process. Impeachment and removal in Alabama is a two-step program, with impeachment in the House of Representatives being followed by an impeachment trial in the Senate.

Per the constitution, after impeaching, the House presents the Senate with articles or charges of impeachment against the impeached official specifying the cause for impeachment. During the impeachment trial, the Senate takes testimony under oath. Conviction in an impeachment trial requires a two-thirds vote of the senators present.

In gubernatorial and lieutenant gubernatorial impeachments, the constitution states that the chief justice of the Supreme Court is to preside. However, if the chief justice is absent or disqualified, the Senate will select an associate justice of the Supreme Court to preside. In all other impeachments, the constitution states that the lieutenant governor will preside. In the case of Supreme Court or appellate judge impeachments, in order for a trial to begin, at least twelve members of the House must verify under oath to the factual basis of the charge upon which an article of impeachment is based.

If the Legislature is not in session, the constitution states that a majority of the membership of the House of Representatives can state in writing to the secretary of state their desire to meet to vote on impeachment of either the governor, lieutenant governor, or any "other officer administrating the office of governor". The secretary of state will be required to, within ten days of receipt of such a notice, to inform the speaker of the House. The speaker will summon the House's members to assemble on a fixed date that will be within fifteen days of the speaker's receipt of such notice to consider impeachment.

After impeachment in the House, the constitution requires that the speaker of the House must notify either the lieutenant governor (in most impeachments) or president pro tempore of the Senate (in the case of lieutenant gubernatorial impeachment), who would then summon the Senate members to meet at the capitol on a fixed date that will be no later than ten days after they receive such notification. The Senate members will meet for the purposes of hearing and trying the articles of impeachment.

While the 1901 Constitution was replaced by a new constitution in 2022, the 2022 constitution retains the same impeachment clause that the 1901 constitution had used since being amended in 2016. The most recent change to the state's constitutional impeachment rules came after Alabama voters voted on November 8, 2016, to approve changes to the 1901 constitution's impeachment language. That constitution's language had previously stated that a majority was needed in order to convict in an impeachment trial, but did not clarify whether this meant a majority of members present or an absolute majority of all members in office. The change altered the vote threshold needed to convict in an impeachment trial to two-thirds of senators present. The change also added members of the Board of Education as officials explicitly listed as impeachable and removed the state superintendent of education from being listed as an impeachable official. Board of Education members are elected officials, while superintendents of education are now appointed by the board members. Other changes were made as well at that time.

==== Additional rules ====
In April 2016, during the impeachment attempt against Governor Robert J. Bentley, the House of Representatives voted 79–14 to adopt a change to the legislative chambers' rules that set a process that would need to be followed before an impeachment could take place. First, articles of impeachment would need the support of at least 21 House members. Then, the House Judiciary Committee would examine the articles of impeachment and hold a vote on whether to place them before the full House for a vote. Thereafter, at least 63 members of the House (three-fifths of its full membership) would need to vote to permit the articles of impeachment to be heard on the floor of the House. Only after all of these steps are followed can the House vote by a majority to impeach.

== Impeachment effort against Secretary of State John Purifoy (1915) ==
Secretary of State John Purifoy faced a 1915 impeachment effort after he was accused of bribing an opponent in the 1914 secretary of state Democratic primary election to withdraw their candidacy. After an impeachment inquiry, the House Committee on the Judiciary recommended impeachment and forwarded three articles of impeachment to the House. The effort to impeach Purifoy ultimately failed, with the House voting against impeachment.

== Impeachment inquiry into Houston County Sheriff U. G. Watford (1940) ==
Impeachment proceedings were held against U. G. Watford (sheriff of Houston County) over charges of "willful neglect of duty, corruption in office, and offense or offenses involving moral turpitude".

== Impeachment effort against Governor Robert J. Bentley (2016–17) ==
Republican governor Robert J. Bentley was subject to an impeachment attempt from 2016 until his resignation in 2017. On March 25, 2016, State Auditor Jim Zeigler, also a Republican, filed an ethics complaint against Bentley for allegations that Bentley had used state property in the course of his extramarital affair with political advisor Rebekah Caldwell Mason. On March 30, 2016, Mason resigned her positions, stating she would no longer serve as the governor's senior political adviser and would no longer receive payment from Bentley's campaign fund. That same day, Republican State Representative Ed Henry announced that he planned to file a resolution calling for the impeachment of Bentley. Additionally, the Alabama Ethics Commission separately opened an investigation into Bentley.

On April 26, 2016, the House passed new rules outlining procedure that would need to be followed before an impeachment vote could be held. The new rules required legislators supporting an impeachment resolution before it could be considered by the House Judiciary Committee, ten more than the proposed impeachment resolution had in terms of sponsors and co-sponsors at the time that these rules were adopted. On April 28, Henry announced that he now had twenty-three other House members join him in supporting his resolution, satisfying the requirement.

In November 2016, upon a request from Republican Attorney General Luther Strange, the Judiciary Committee temporarily suspended its impeachment inquiry hearings. Strange voiced concern that the hearings could threaten his office's criminal investigation of a separate criminal matter. In February 2017, when Bentley appointed Strange to fill a vacant United States Senate seat, there was speculation that Bentley's appointee for the new attorney general might be someone that would be less likely to prosecute him.

A bipartisan subcommittee of the Senate was created in February 2017 to look at creating rules for a potential impeachment trial.

On April 6, 2017, the Alabama Ethics Commission voted to find probable cause that Bentley had committed an instance of violating that the ethics law and three instances of violating campaign finance law. That day, the special counsel hired by the House Judiciary Committee released his pre-hearing report which made many allegations against Bentley, concluding that he "encouraged an atmosphere of intimidation." The House Judiciary Committee was set to conduct impeachment inquiry proceedings the following week. However, also on April 7, 2017, Bentley filed in court to request an order to stop the impeachment proceedings and to block the House Judiciary Committee counsel from releasing his report. Bentley argued that he had been denied due process by being unable to cross-examine witnesses against him, and also argued both that the charges made against him were vague and that he had been given insufficient notice. A suspension of the impeachment proceedings was granted the same day by Montgomery Circuit Court Judge Greg Griffin, who had been appointed to the bench by Bentley. The House Judiciary Committee immediately appealed. On April 8, 2017, the state's Supreme Court unanimously moved to stay the lower court's order. Impeachment hearings were scheduled to begin on April 10. On April 10, Bentley resigned from office shortly after striking plea agreement on misdemeanor campaign finance law violations. The plea deal required that he resign.

== See also ==
- Impeachment by state and territorial governments of the United States
- Impeachment in the United States
