= Kelvin Datcher =

American politician

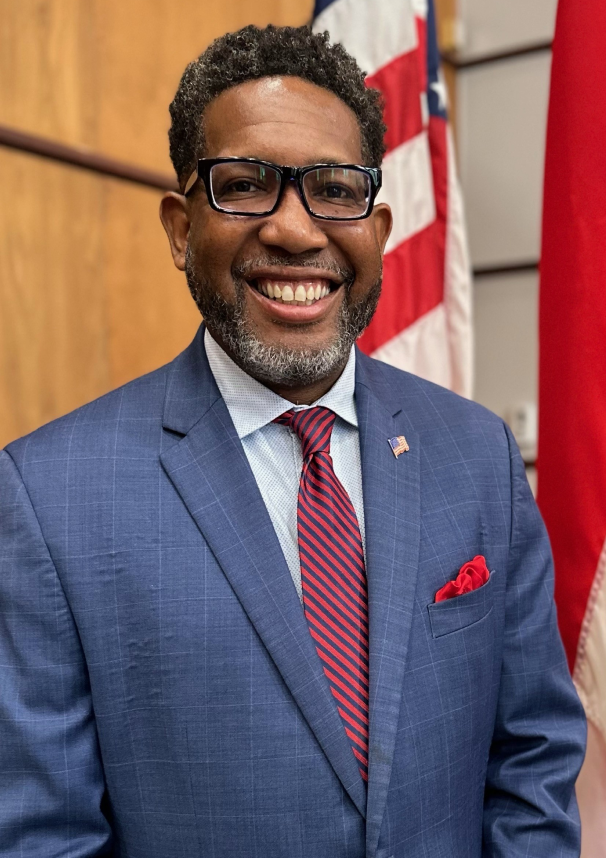

Member of the Alabama House of Representatives from the 52nd district
- Incumbent
- Assumed office October 2, 2024
- Preceded by: John Rogers
- Succeeded by: GiGi Hayes (elect)

Personal details
- Party: Democratic
- Website: https://www.kelvindatcher.com/

Kelvin Datcher is an American politician. He serves as a Democratic member of the Alabama House of Representatives for the 52nd district since winning a special election in October 2024. The district is based in the Birmingham-area and includes a section of the University of Alabama at Birmingham and parts of Fairfield and Homewood.
