= Alabama State House =

State government building in Montgomery, AL

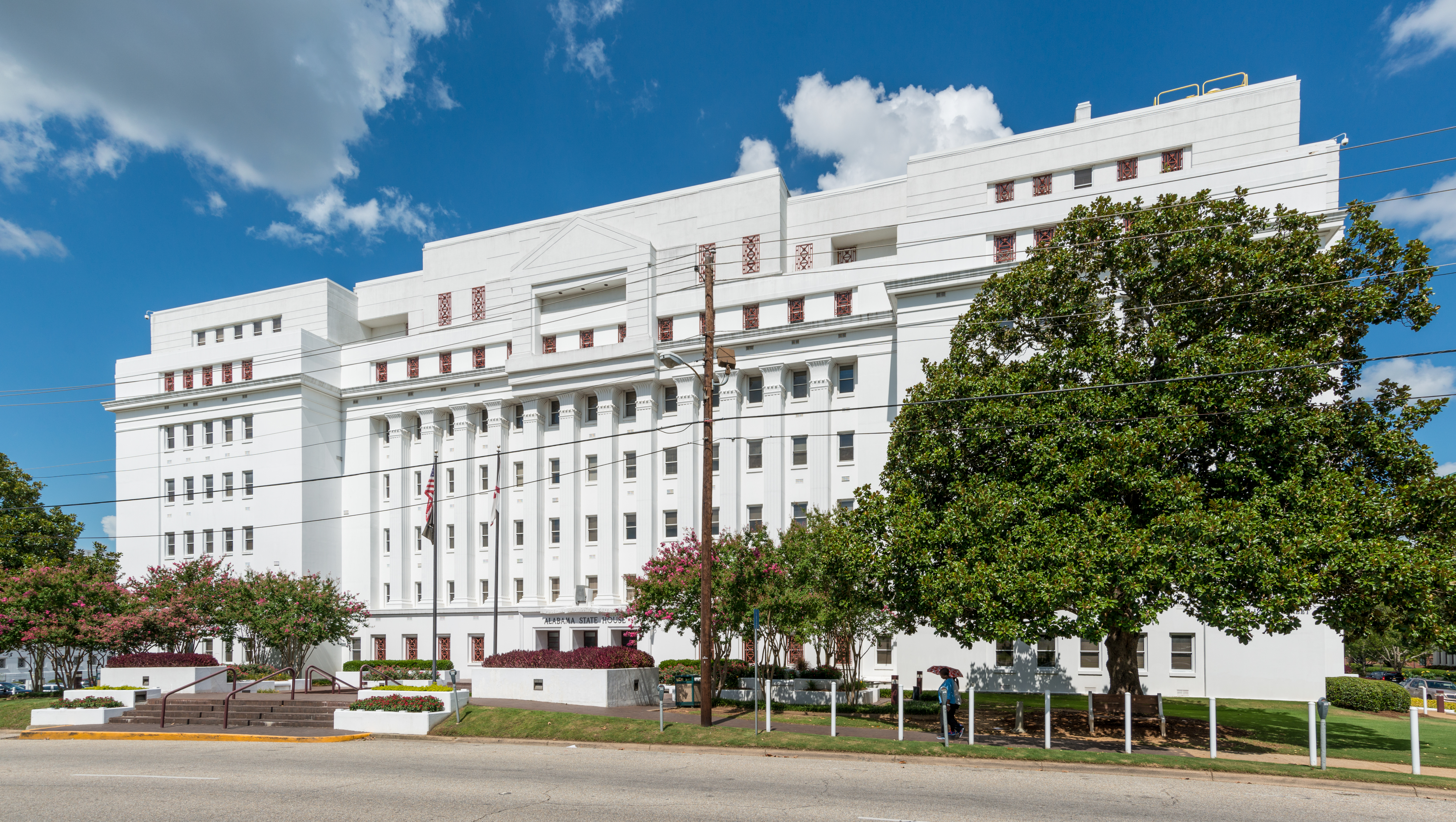
- The State House in 2016
- Interactive map of the Alabama State House area

General information
- Location: 11 South Union Street; Montgomery, Alabama, United States
- Coordinates: 32°22′37″N 86°17′57″W
- Completed: 1963; 63 years ago
- Owner: State of Alabama

Height
- Roof: 109 ft (33 m)

Technical details
- Floor count: 7 above ground, 1 below

The Alabama State House is a state government building in Montgomery, Alabama, United States. It was originally constructed as the Alabama Highway Department Building in 1963. It houses several state agencies, most notably the Alabama Legislature, which comprises the Alabama Senate and the Alabama House of Representatives and moved into the building in 1985. Due to the construction of a new state house, it is slated to be demolished in 2027.

== History ==
The State House was opened in 1963 as the Alabama Highway Department Building. It housed the Alabama Department of Transportation, then known as the Alabama State Highway Department, until 1985, when the Alabama Legislature moved into the upper floors while the Alabama State Capitol building was being renovated. Article IV, Section 48 of the Alabama Constitution requires the Legislature to meet in the Capitol, but Amendment 427 was passed to enable it to select another place to temporarily meet until renovations at the Capitol were complete. Although all major renovations were completed there in 1992, the Legislature has continued to occupy the State House. The building was renamed after the 1985 move. Originally, the Legislature occupied the 5th through 7th floors. When the Legislature outgrew this space, an eighth floor was added.

== Structure and usage ==
The State House has seven above ground floors and one at basement level. The first floor, located at basement level, is used for miscellaneous offices and committee rooms. The second floor contains the Governor's Legislative Office and the Alabama Budget Office. The third floor houses the Attorney General. The fifth and sixth floors are dedicated exclusively to the use of the House of Representatives. The seventh and eighth floors are likewise used by the Senate. Additionally, the Lieutenant Governor's offices are located on the seventh floor.

== Replacement ==
Due to mold, structural and accessibility issues, and other concerns, a replacement of the current building has been discussed since the late 2000s. Proposals for a replacement included a new state house on the opposite end of Dexter Avenue, a street which terminates at the old capitol, or an addition to the old capitol. In the 2009 session, legislators debated and passed a bill to begin investigating proposals, but no action was taken.

On May 7, 2020, it was reported that Alabama State Senator Del Marsh had requested $200,000,000 of CARES Act funding in order to build a new State House. After backlash from various Alabama citizens, the funding request was removed.

Citing the need to address aging infrastructure, space constraints, and accessibility issues, the Alabama Legislature approved the construction of a new state house in 2023. Goodwyn Mills Cawood, in partnership with Robert A.M. Stern Architects, was selected to design the new state house. It is sited on a city block behind the current state house which was previously a parking lot. Construction on the $400 million project, which is being built by Retirement Systems of Alabama (RSA), began in 2023. The building was topped out in 2025, and legislature anticipates it will move into the new state house by 2027. It will be owned by RSA and leased to the state legislature until the cost of construction is paid back with 8% interest, after which the state will have the option to buy the building. The original state house will be demolished and replaced with green space, in order to form a mall connecting the new state house with the old capitol. The new state house will include a $35 million parking deck.

== See also ==
- Government of Alabama
- List of Alabama state legislatures
- List of state and territorial capitols in the United States
