= Joe Faust (politician) =

American politician

Member of the Alabama House of Representatives from the 94th district
- In office 2002 – November 9, 2022
- Succeeded by: Jennifer Fidler

Personal details
- Born: September 13, 1940 (age 85) Birmingham, Alabama, United States
- Party: Republican

Teddy Joe Faust, Sr. (born September 13, 1940) is an American politician. He was a member of the Alabama House of Representatives from the 94th District, serving since 2002. He is a member of the Republican party. He is a resident of Fairhope, Alabama and a graduate of Faulkner State Community College (1968). He was in the House for 6 terms, and lost his seventh reelection on May 24, 2022 to Jennifer Fidler. He is a United States Army veteran.
