= Alicia Escott Lumpkin =

American politician

Member-elect of the Alabama House of Representatives from the 60th district
- Assuming office November 4, 2026
- Succeeding: Juandalynn Givan

Personal details
- Party: Democratic
- Education: University of Tennessee; Birmingham School of Law (JD)

Alicia Escott Lumpkin is an American politician who is the member-elect of the Alabama House of Representatives from the 60th district. She is a member of the Alabama Democratic Party.

== Alabama House of Representatives ==
Lumpkin announced her bid for state house in 2026 against incumbent Democratic representative Juandalynn Givan. She received the backing of Birmingham mayor Randall Woodfin.
