= List of state and territorial capitols in the United States =

A capitol, or seat of government, is the building or complex of buildings from which a government such as that of a U.S. state, the District of Columbia, or the organized territories of the United States, exercises its authority. Although most states (39 of the 50) use the term capitol, Indiana and Ohio use the term Statehouse, and eight states use State House: Maine, Maryland, Massachusetts, New Hampshire, New Jersey, Rhode Island, South Carolina, and Vermont. Delaware has a Legislative Hall. The state of Alabama has a State Capitol, but since 1985 its legislature has met in the State House.

A capitol typically contains the meeting place for its state's legislature and offices for the state's governor, though this is not true for every state. The legislatures of Alabama, Nevada, and North Carolina meet in other nearby buildings, but their governor's offices remain in the capitol. The Arizona State Capitol is now strictly a museum and both the legislature and the governor's office are in nearby buildings. Only Arizona does not have its governor's office in the state capitol, though in Delaware, Ohio, Michigan, Vermont, and Virginia, the offices there are for ceremonial use only.

In ten states, the state's highest court also routinely meets in the capitol: Indiana, Kentucky, Nebraska, North Dakota, Oklahoma (both civil and criminal courts), Pennsylvania (one of three sites), South Dakota, West Virginia, Minnesota and Wisconsin. The other 40 states have separate buildings for their supreme courts, though in Michigan and Utah, the high court also has ceremonial meetings at the capitol.

Most U.S. capitol buildings are in the neoclassical style with a central dome, a style based on the U.S. Capitol, and are often in a park-like setting.

Eleven of the fifty state capitols do not feature a dome: Alaska, Florida, Hawaii, Louisiana, New Mexico, New York, North Dakota, Ohio, Oregon, Tennessee, and Virginia.

Forty-four capitols are listed on the National Register of Historic Places, marked with NRHP. Nineteen of those are further designated as National Historic Landmarks, marked with NHL.

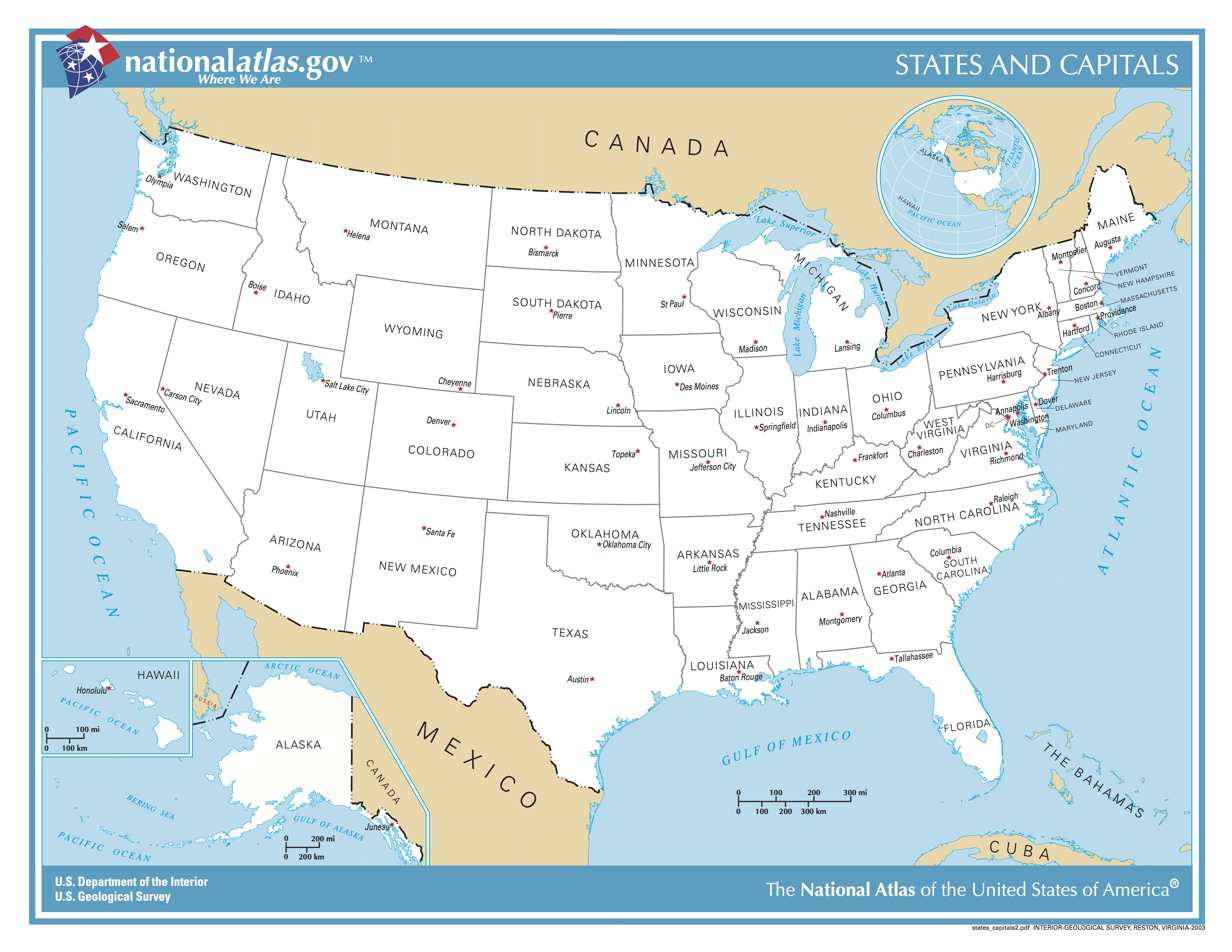

== State capitols ==
Photograph	Capitol name	Location	Address	Years of construction	Height (feet)	Notes
	Alabama State Capitol Alabama State House	Montgomery; 32°22′38.81″N 86°18′3.39″W; 32°22′37.294″N 86°17′57.991″W	600 Dexter Avenue (capitol) 11 S Union Street (state house)	1850–1851; 1885 (East wing); 1903–1906 (South wing); 1911–1912 (North wing) 1960 (State House; the Legislature moved into the building in 1985)	119	NHL, NRHP Original meeting site for the Provisional Confederate Congress (1861) The State Capitol is only used for ceremonial meetings; actual government meetings are held in the State House
	Alaska State Capitol	Juneau; 58°18′7.91″N 134°24′37.68″W	120 4th Street	1929–1931	118	
	Arizona State Capitol Arizona House of Representatives Arizona Senate Arizona Executive Tower	Phoenix; 33°26′53.15″N 112°5′49.54″W	1700 W Washington Street	1899–1900 (State Capitol) 1960 (House of Representatives and Senate buildings) 1974 (Executive Tower)	92	NRHP The State Capitol Building no longer hosts government meetings; The office of the governor is located in the Executive tower
	Arkansas State Capitol	Little Rock; 34°44′48.33″N 92°17′19.54″W	500 Woodlane Street	1899–1915	230	NRHP
	California State Capitol	Sacramento; 38°34′35.66″N 121°29′36.28″W	1010 L Street	1860–1874	247	NRHP
	Colorado State Capitol	Denver; 39°44′20.74″N 104°59′5.63″W	200 E Colfax Avenue	1886–1907	272	NRHP Exactly one mile above sea level
	Connecticut State Capitol	Hartford; 41°45′50.89″N 72°40′58″W	210 Capitol Avenue	1872–1879	257	NHL, NRHP
	Delaware Legislative Hall	Dover; 39°9′26.3″N 75°31′11″W	410 Legislative Avenue	1933; 1965–1970 (north and south wings); 1994 (expansion of east wings)	70 (est.)	Only capitol in the Colonial Revival architectural style Only capitol that is named a "Hall" and does not use the term "State" The Old Statehouse, used from 1792 to 1932, is listed on the NRHP.
	Florida State Capitol	Tallahassee; 30°26′17.2″N 84°16′53.76″W	400 S Monroe Street	1973–1977	322	NHL, NRHP Newest state capitol Second-largest state capitol
	Georgia State Capitol	Atlanta; 33°44′57.38″N 84°23′17.74″W	206 Washington Street SW	1883–1889	272	NHL, NRHP
	Hawaii State Capitol	Honolulu; 21°18′26.43″N 157°51′26.16″W	415 S Beretania Street	1960–1969	100 (est.)	Part of NRHP Hawaii Capital Historic District Second-newest state capitol
	Idaho State Capitol	Boise; 43°37′3.71″N 116°11′58.61″W	700 W Jefferson Street	1905–1913; 1919–1920 (wings); 2008–2010 (underground wings)	208	NRHP
	Illinois State Capitol	Springfield; 39°47′54.66″N 89°39′17.6″W	401 S 2nd Street	1868-1888	361	NRHP Tallest non-skyscraper capitol, including Washington, DC
	Indiana Statehouse	Indianapolis; 39°46′7″N 86°9′45″W	200 W Washington Street	1877–1888	256	NRHP
	Iowa State Capitol	Des Moines; 41°35′28.24″N 93°36′13.93″W	1007 E Grand Ave	1871–1886	275	NRHP
	Kansas State Capitol	Topeka; 39°2′52.83″N 95°40′41.36″W	300 W 10th Avenue	1866–1873 (east wing); 1879–1881 (west wing); 1884–1906 (center)	326	NRHP
	Kentucky State Capitol	Frankfort; 38°11′12.4″N 84°52′31.2″W	700 Capitol Avenue	1905–1910	210	NRHP
	Louisiana State Capitol	Baton Rouge; 30°27′25.46″N 91°11′14.66″W	900 N Third Street	1930–1932	450	NHL, NRHP Tallest state capitol
	Maine State House	Augusta; 44°18′26.05″N 69°46′54.04″W	210 State Street	1828–1832; 1889–1891 (wing); 1909–1911 (wings)	185	NRHP
	Maryland State House	Annapolis; 38°58′43″N 76°29′28″W	100 State Circle	1772–1797	181	NHL, NRHP Oldest active state capitol
	Massachusetts State House	Boston; 42°21′29.43″N 71°3′49.32″W	24 Beacon Street	1795–1798	200 (est.)	NHL, NRHP U.S. Historic District Contributing property
	Michigan State Capitol	Lansing; 42°44′1.42″N 84°33′20.12″W	100 N Capitol Avenue	1872–1878 (opened in 1879)	270	NHL, NRHP
	Minnesota State Capitol	Saint Paul; 44°57′18.53″N 93°6′8.05″W	75 Rev. Dr. Martin Luther King Jr. Boulevard	1893–1905	223	NRHP
	Mississippi State Capitol	Jackson; 32°18′14″N 90°10′56″W	400 High Street	1901–1903	180	NRHP
	Missouri State Capitol	Jefferson City; 38°34′44.83″N 92°10′22.77″W	201 W Capitol Avenue	1911–1917	238	NRHP
	Montana State Capitol	Helena; 46°35′8.52″N 112°1′6.24″W	1301 E 6th Avenue	1896–1902; 1909–1912 (wings)	165	NRHP
	Nebraska State Capitol	Lincoln; 40°48′29.12″N 96°41′58.51″W	1445 K Street	1919–1932	400	NHL, NRHP Second-tallest state capitol
	Nevada State Capitol Nevada Legislature	Carson City; 39°9′50.67″N 119°45′58.65″W	101 N Carson Street (state capitol) 401 S Carson Street (legislative building)	1869–1871 1971 (new legislative building)	112	NRHP The State Capitol is no longer used for government meetings, which are now held in the Nevada Legislature building.
	New Hampshire State House	Concord; 43°12′24.29″N 71°32′17.26″W	107 N Main Street	1815–1818	150	NRHP U.S. Historic District Contributing property The State House has been listed on the NRHP since 1983 as part of the Concord Civic District.
	New Jersey State House	Trenton; 40°13′13.57″N 74°46′11.65″W	125 W State Street	1792	145	NRHP U.S. Historic District Contributing property
	New Mexico State Capitol	Santa Fe; 35°40′56.21″N 105°56′22.77″W	490 Old Santa Fe Trail	1964–1966	35 (est.)	Only round state capitol
	New York State Capitol	Albany; 42°39′9.19″N 73°45′26.36″W	State Street & Washington Avenue	1867–1899	220	NHL, NRHP U.S. Historic District Contributing property
	North Carolina State Capitol North Carolina State Legislative Building	Raleigh; 35°46′49″N 78°38′21″W; 35°46′59.53″N 78°38′20.24″W	1 E Edenton Street (capitol) 16 W Jones Street (legislative building)	1833–1840 1963 (Legislative Building)	98	NHL, NRHP U.S. Historic District Contributing property The State Capitol is no longer used by the state legislature, which now meets in the State Legislative building
	North Dakota State Capitol	Bismarck; 46°49′14.93″N 100°46′57.87″W	600 E Boulevard Avenue	1920–1924; 1931–1934 (office tower & wing)	242	
	Ohio Statehouse	Columbus; 39°57′41″N 82°59′56″W	1 Capitol Square	1837–1861	158	NHL, NRHP
	Oklahoma State Capitol	Oklahoma City; 35°29′32.21″N 97°30′12.14″W	2300 N Lincoln Boulevard	1914–1917; 2000–2002 (dome)	255	NRHP
	Oregon State Capitol	Salem; 44°56′19.43″N 123°1′48.35″W	900 Court Street NE	1935; 1977 (wings)	162	NRHP
	Pennsylvania State Capitol	Harrisburg; 40°15′52″N 76°53′0″W	501 N 3rd Street	1904–1906	272	NHL, NRHP U.S. Historic District Contributing property
	Rhode Island State House	Providence; 41°49′51″N 71°24′54″W	82 Smith Street	1895–1904	223	NRHP
	South Carolina State House	Columbia; 34°0′1.56″N 81°1′59.33″W	1100 Gervais Street	1855–1907	180	NHL, NRHP
	South Dakota State Capitol	Pierre; 44°22′1.8″N 100°20′46.87″W	500 E Capitol Avenue	1905–1911	161	NRHP
	Tennessee State Capitol	Nashville; 36°9′57″N 86°47′3″W	600 Dr. M.L.K. Jr. Boulevard	1845–1859	206	NHL, NRHP
	Texas State Capitol	Austin; 30°16′29″N 97°44′26″W	1100 Congress Avenue	1881–1888; 1993 (underground extension)	311	NHL, NRHP Largest state capitol
	Utah State Capitol	Salt Lake City; 40°46′38″N 111°53′17″W	350 State Street	1912–1916; 2004–2008 (major restoration and renovation)	286	NRHP
	Vermont State House	Montpelier; 44°15′44″N 72°34′51″W	115 State Street	1834–1836	136	NHL, NRHP
	Virginia State Capitol	Richmond; 37°32′19.53″N 77°26′0.94″W	1000 Bank Street	1785–1790; 1904–1906 (wings); restored, renovated and expanded 2004–2007	83	NHL, NRHP Second-oldest active state capitol and meeting site for the Confederate Congress (1861–1865)
	Washington State Capitol	Olympia; 47°02′08″N 122°54′18″W	416 Sid Snyder Avenue SW	1919–1928 (legislative building)	287	NRHP U.S. Historic District
	West Virginia State Capitol	Charleston; 38°20′11″N 81°36′44″W	1900 Kanawha Boulevard E	1924–1932	292	NRHP U.S. Historic district Contributing property
	Wisconsin State Capitol	Madison; 43°4′28″N 89°23′5″W	2 E Main Street	1906–1917; 1988–2002 (major renovation and restoration)	284	NHL, NRHP
	Wyoming State Capitol	Cheyenne; 41°8′25″N 104°49′11″W	200 W 24th Street	1886–1890; 1915–1917 (House and Senate chambers)	146	NHL, NRHP

== Territorial and federal district capitols ==
Photograph	Capitol name	Location	Years of current capitol construction	Notes
	American Samoa Fono Building	Fagatogo; 14°16′42″S 170°41′20″W	1973	Demolished in 2017; replacement is under construction.
	John A. Wilson Building; District Building	Washington, D.C. 38°53′41″N 77°1′54″W	1904–1908	NRHP Originally called the District Building until renamed in 1994 after district councilor John A. Wilson
	Guam Congress Building	Hagåtña; 13°28′30″N 144°45′8″E	1949	NRHP
	Northern Mariana Islands Commonwealth Legislature Building	Capitol Hill; 15°12′42″N 145°45′17″E	1948	
	Puerto Rico Commonwealth Capitol	San Juan; 18°28′8″N 66°6′22″W	1921–1929	NRHP
	United States Virgin Islands Legislature Building	Charlotte Amalie; 18°20′24″N 64°55′46″W	1828	

== See also ==
- List of capitals in the United States
- Cherokee National Capitol
- Choctaw Nation Capitol
- Chickasaw Nation Capitol
- Creek National Capitol
- Symbolism of domes
