= GiGi Hayes =

American politician

Member-elect of the Alabama House of Representatives from the 52nd district
- Assuming office November 3, 2026
- Succeeding: Kelvin Datcher

Personal details
- Party: Democratic

GiGi Hayes is an American politician. A member of the Democratic Party, she is the member-elect for the 52nd district of the Alabama House of Representatives.
