= Hattie Hooker Wilkins =

American politician (1875–1949)

- Born: Hattie Hooker; July 28, 1875; Selma, Alabama, United States
- Died: 1949 (aged 73–74)
- Education: Normal College Nashville, Tennessee
- Occupations: Politician, suffragist, and women's rights activist
- Known for: First woman elected to a seat in the Alabama Legislature
- Spouse: Joseph G. Wilkins (m. 1898)

Hattie Wilkins (née Hooker) (July 28, 1875 – 1949) was an American Progressive Era suffragist and women's rights activist who is best known for being the first woman elected to a seat in the Alabama Legislature. She was inducted into the Alabama Women's Hall of Fame in 1997.

== Family and early life ==
Hattie Hooker, the daughter of Frederick Josiah Hooker and Alexina (Fellows) Hooker, was born on July 28, 1875, at Selma, Alabama, in Dallas County. She was educated at Boss Calloway's School in Selma, and later attended Normal College in Nashville, Tennessee, to prepare to teach school. Along with all of her schooling she was also involved with the local church, the Broad Streed Presbyterian Church.

After graduating in 1894, she began a career in teaching, up until her marriage. In 1898, Hattie married Joseph G. Wilkins, an industrialist, and they resided in Selma. Together they had four children, although one of her children died at the age of three after drinking lye water. When her family was asked about her most noteworthy accomplishments, they answered with a statement that "her most significant accomplishment was that of wife and mother, and maker of a beautiful home that is a center of refinement and those lovely characteristics that go to make the perfect home life."

== Suffragist and women's rights activist ==
Wilkins was one of the first suffragists in the state of Alabama. Wilkins was a founding member of the Alabama Equal Suffrage Association and the Alabama League of Women Voters. Wilkins explained her ardor for women's rights, along with the right to vote, with the following statement: "Self-direction or freedom of choice is necessary to the highest mental and spiritual development of a human being. Because democracy gives to each person this opportunity for development, democracy is right. Because democracy is right, Woman Suffrage is right."

== Legislator ==
After women gained suffrage, Wilkins stayed involved in politics and in 1922, she was one of three candidates for a seat in the 1923 Alabama Legislature. Wilkins beat the incumbent candidate for the Alabama House of Representatives, and became the first woman elected to a seat in the Alabama Legislature. Wilkins joined the legislature as a democrat with the belief that in a nation of both men and women, the government should cater to the needs of men and women alike. Her main agenda was aimed towards reforming education, healthcare and the special needs of her constituents while being head of the committee on public health. Her efforts as a legislator gained the respect of her colleagues within the legislation. She decided not to run for a second term but upon leaving she was gifted, by her colleagues, with an inscribed cup that said: "To Mrs. Wilkins, the First Woman Member of the Alabama House of Representatives, a Token of Esteem From Her Fellow Members, 1923."

== Death and legacy ==
Wilkins died in 1949.

In 1977, Wilkins was selected as one of twenty-five Alabama women who were highlighted in the historical exhibit Faces and Voices of Alabama Women. This is a permanent collection at the University of Alabama in Tuscaloosa. She was once again memorialized in 1997, when she was inducted into the Alabama Women's Hall of Fame. This was hosted by Judson College in Marion, Perry County.
