= Jennifer Fidler =

American politician (born 1970)

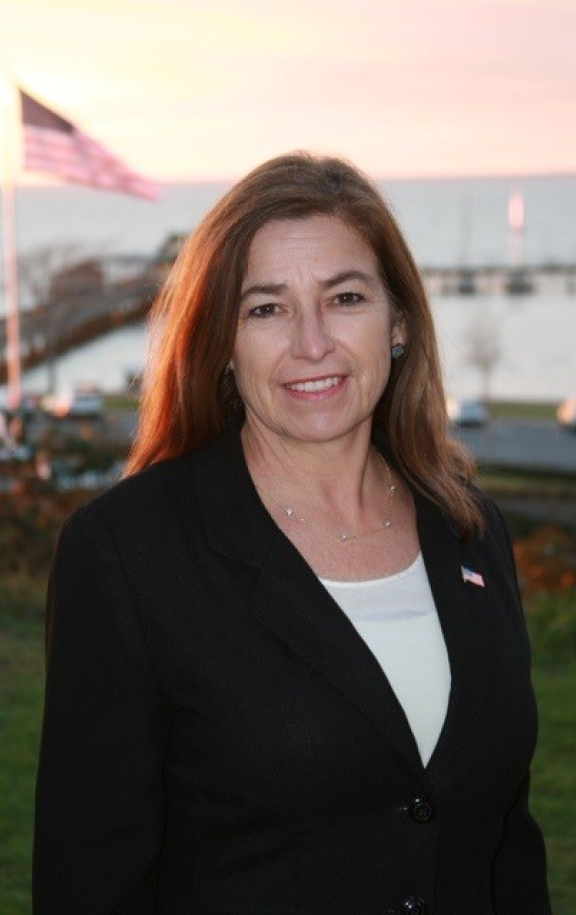

Member of the Alabama House of Representatives from the 94th district
- Incumbent
- Assumed office November 9, 2022
- Preceded by: Joe Faust

Personal details
- Born: June 19, 1970 (age 56) Mobile, Alabama, U.S.
- Party: Republican
- Spouse: Reagan Scroggins
- Education: undergraduate degree, master’s degree in education
- Alma mater: Auburn University, Troy University, Coastal Alabama Community College

Jennifer Fidler (born June 19, 1970) is an American politician who has served as a Republican member of the Alabama House of Representatives since November 8, 2022. She represents Alabama's 94th House district.

== Electoral history ==
Fidler was elected on November 8, 2022, in the 2022 Alabama House of Representatives election against Libertarian opponent Margaret Helveston. She assumed office the next day on November 9, 2022.

== Education ==
Fidler has an undergraduate degree from Auburn University in Ornamental Horticulture, obtained in 1992, and a master's degree in education from Troy University in 2001. She also attended Coastal Alabama Community College.

Alabama House of Representatives
Preceded by Joe Faust	Member of the Alabama House of Representatives; 2022–present	Succeeded by incumbent
