= Alabama House of Representatives =

Lower house of the Alabama legislature

Coordinates: 32°22′37″N 86°17′57″W

- Alabama State Legislature

Type
- Type: Lower house
- Term limits: None

History
- New session started: March 7, 2023

Leadership
- Speaker: Nathaniel Ledbetter (R) since January 10, 2023
- Speaker pro tempore: Chris Pringle (R) since January 10, 2023
- Majority Leader: Paul Lee (R) since February 18, 2026
- Minority Leader: Anthony Daniels (D) since February 8, 2017

Structure
- Seats: 105
- Political groups: Majority: Republican (74); Minority: Democratic (31)
- Length of term: 4 years
- Authority: Article IV, Alabama Constitution
- Salary: $53,913 per year

Elections
- Voting system: First-past-the-post
- Last election: November 3, 2026 (105 seats)
- Next election: November 5, 2030 (105 seats)
- Redistricting: Legislative Control

Meeting place
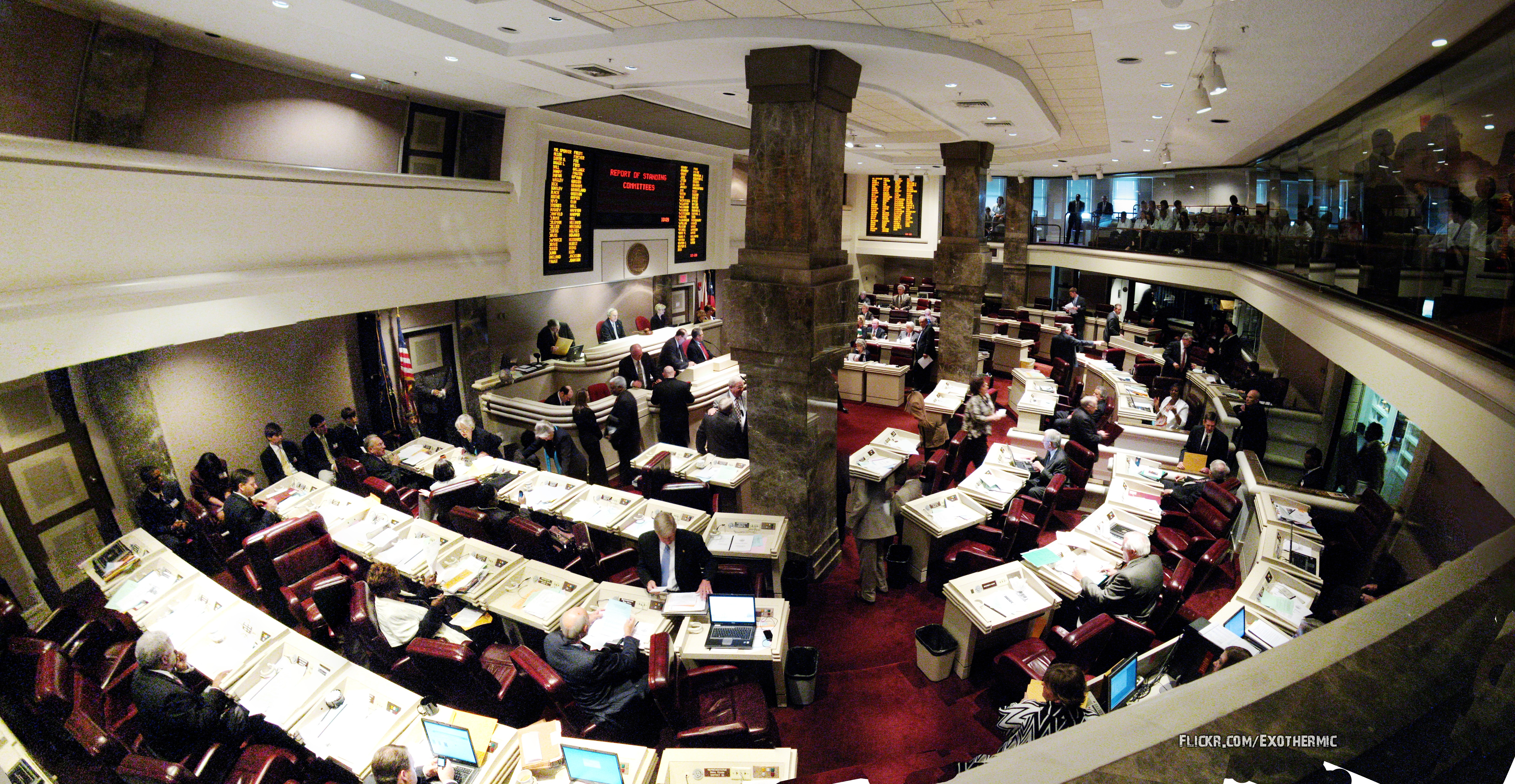
- House of Representatives; Alabama State House; Montgomery, Alabama

Website
- Alabama House of Representatives

Rules
- Alabama House of Representatives Rules

The Alabama House of Representatives is the lower house of the Alabama Legislature, the state legislature of the state of Alabama. The House is composed of 105 members representing an equal number of districts, with each constituency containing at least 42,380 citizens. There are no term limits in the House. The House is also one of the five lower houses of state legislatures in the United States that is elected every four years. Other lower houses, including the United States House of Representatives, are elected for a two-year term.

The House meets at the Alabama State House in Montgomery. The speaker of the Alabama House of Representatives is its leader.

== Legal provisions ==
The Alabama House of Representatives is the lower house of the Alabama Legislature, with the upper house being the Alabama Senate. Both bodies are constitutionally required to convene annually at the Alabama State House. In quadrennial election years (e.g. 2018), they convene on the second Tuesday in January. In the first year after quadrennial election years (e.g. 2019), they convene on the first Tuesday in March. In the second and third years of quadrennium (e.g. 2020 and 2021), the Legislature convenes on the first Tuesday in February. From that date of convention, the House of Representatives must meet for 30 legislative days over the course of 105 calendar days.

The legislature is not permitted to call for special sessions, though they may determine the subject of those sessions by a two-thirds vote in the event that they do take place. Special sessions in the Alabama Legislature span 30 calendar days and meet for 12 of them.

=== Membership requirements ===
The Alabama House of Representatives consists of 105 members, each representing single-member legislative districts of equal size. State representatives have a term length of four years, uncommonly lengthy among lower legislative chambers in the United States. Members have been elected in what correspond with United States midterm election years since 1902.

In order to serve in the House, an individual must have attained the age of 21. The person must also be a qualified voter who has resided in the state of Alabama for at least three years and in their legislative district for at least one year. In accordance with Section 46 of the Constitution of Alabama, "the terms of office of the senators and representatives shall commence on the day after the general election at which they are elected, and expire on the day after the general election held in the fourth year after their election." As a result, representatives formally assume their positions on the day after Election Day in early November.

=== Leadership ===
The most powerful individual in the chamber is the speaker of the House, who is elected by all 105 representatives. Other leadership positions include the speaker pro tempore (also elected by the entire chamber) and the majority leader (elected by the majority party caucus).

The minority party is headed by the minority leader, who is elected by the minority party caucus.

=== Compensation ===
Constitutional Amendment 57 provides the methods for setting legislative compensation. Since 2021, representatives earn $51,734 per year. Representatives are also allotted $85 per day for single overnight stays or $100 per day for multiple overnight stays in order to accommodate lodging needs. The presiding officer of the House of Representatives earns an additional $18,000 per year.

No retirement benefits are available to representatives.

=== Legislative process ===
House bills are referred to their committees of jurisdiction by the speaker. Bills can be introduced at any point in the legislative session.

The governor of Alabama has the authority to use a line-item veto on appropriations bills as long as they are returned to the legislature before its adjournment. In most circumstances, during the legislative session, the governor has six days to consider vetoing legislation before it automatically becomes law. If session has concluded, the governor has 10 days to consider legislation. Vetoes can be overturned by a simple majority vote in both chambers of the Alabama Legislature.

=== Legislative staffing ===
State representatives are given year-round personal staff at the Capitol, as well as some staff who are shared between members. Representatives for select counties are entitled to shared district office staff. All committees have paid clerical staff, while only some committees have additional professional staff.

=== Committees ===
Committee members and committee chairpersons are both assigned by the speaker.

There are currently 33 standing committees in the House. They are as follows:

- Agriculture and Forestry
- Baldwin County Legislation
- Boards, Agencies and Commissions
- Children and Senior Advocacy
- Commerce and Small Business
- Constitution, Campaigns and Elections
- County and Municipal Government
- Economic Development and Tourism
- Education Policy
- Ethics and Campaign Finance
- Financial Services
- Fiscal Responsibility
- Health
- Insurance
- Jefferson County Legislation
- Judiciary
- Lee County Legislation
- Limestone County Legislation
- Local Legislation
- Madison County Legislation
- Military and Veterans Affairs
- Mobile County Legislation
- Montgomery County Legislation
- Public Safety and Homeland Security
- Rules
- Shelby County Legislation
- State Government
- Technology and Research
- Transportation, Utilities and Infrastructure
- Tuscaloosa County Legislation

== Composition ==
Affiliation	Party (Shading indicates majority caucus)		Total	Vacant
Affiliation	Republican	Democratic	Total	Vacant
End of previous session	76	29	105	0
November 4, 2026	74	31	105	0
Latest voting share	70.5%	29.5%		

== House leadership ==
Position	Name	Party	District
Speaker of the House	Nathaniel Ledbetter	Republican	24th–Rainsville
Speaker pro tempore	Chris Pringle	Republican	101st–Mobile
Clerk of the House	John Treadwell		

=== Majority leadership ===
Position	Name	Party	District
Majority Leader	Paul Lee	Republican	86th–Dothan
Majority Whip	James Lomax	Republican	20th–Huntsville
Majority caucus vice-chair	Chip Brown	Republican	105th–Mobile
Majority caucus secretary/treasurer		Republican	

=== Minority leadership ===
Position	Name	Party	District
Minority Leader	Anthony Daniels	Democratic	53rd–Huntsville
Minority caucus chair	Ontario Tillman	Democratic	56th–Bessemer
Minority caucus vice-chair	Mary Moore	Democratic	59th–Birmingham
Minority caucus party whip	Curtis Travis	Democratic	72nd-Tuscaloosa
Minority caucus whips	Kenyatte Hassell	Democratic	78th–Montgomery
Minority caucus whips	GiGi Hayes	Democratic	52nd–Birmingham
Minority caucus whips	Marilyn Lands	Democratic	10th–Huntsville
Minority caucus secretary/treasurer	Kelvin Lawrence	Democratic	69th–Hayneville
Minority caucus policy member at-large	Prince Chestnut	Democratic	67th-Valley Grande

== House roster ==
District	Name	Party	Residence	First elected	Counties represented
1	Maurice McCaney	Rep	Killen	2026	Lauderdale
2	Ben Harrison	Rep	Athens	2022	Lauderdale, Limestone
3	Bubba Underwood	Rep	Tuscumbia	2022	Colbert, Lauderdale
4	Parker Moore	Rep	Decatur	2018↑	Limestone, Madison, Morgan
5	Danny Crawford	Rep	Athens	2016	Limestone
6	Andy Whitt	Rep	Ardmore	2018	Limestone, Madison
7	Ernie Yarbrough	Rep	Trinity	2022	Colbert, Lawrence, Morgan
8	Patrick Johnson	Rep	Decatur	2026	Morgan
9	Scott Stadthagen	Rep	Hartselle	2018	Morgan
10	Marilyn Lands	Dem	Huntsville	2024↑	Madison
11	Heath Allbright	Rep	Holly Pond	2025↑	Blount, Cullman
12	Cindy Myrex	Rep	Bremen	2025↑	Cullman
13	Mike Elliott	Rep	Jasper	2026	Walker
14	Tim Wadsworth	Rep	Arley	2014	Cullman, Jefferson, Walker, Winston
15	Nell Brown	Dem	McCalla	2026	Jefferson, Shelby
16	Bryan Brinyark	Rep	Windham Springs	2024↑	Fayette, Jefferson, Tuscaloosa
17	Phil Segraves	Rep	Guin	2026	Lamar, Marion, Winston
18	Jamie Kiel	Rep	Russellville	2018	Colbert, Franklin
19	Laura Hall	Dem	Huntsville	1993↑	Madison
20	James Lomax	Rep	Huntsville	2022	Madison
21	Rex Reynolds	Rep	Huntsville	2018↑	Madison
22	Ritchie Whorton	Rep	Owens Cross Roads	2014	Jackson, Madison
23	Mike Kirkland	Rep	Scottsboro	2022	Jackson
24	Nathaniel Ledbetter	Rep	Rainsville	2014	DeKalb
25	Allison Montgomery	Dem	Madison	2026	Limestone, Madison
26	Brock Colvin	Rep	Albertville	2022	Marshall
27	Jeana Ross	Rep	Guntersville	2024↑	Marshall
28	Mack Butler	Rep	Rainbow City	2022	Etowah
29	Mark Gidley	Rep	Gadsden	2022	Calhoun, Etowah
30	Craig Lipscomb	Rep	Gadsden	2012	Etowah, St. Clair
31	Troy Stubbs	Rep	Prattville	2022	Elmore
32	Debra Foster	Dem	Anniston	2026	Calhoun, Talladega
33	Ben Robbins	Rep	Montgomery	2021↑	Coosa, Talladega
34	David Standridge	Rep	Oneonta	2012	Blount
35	Steve Hurst	Rep	Munford	1998	Calhoun, Clay, Talladega
36	Randy Wood	Rep	Anniston	2002	Calhoun, St. Clair, Talladega
37	Jeff Monroe	Rep	Five Points	2026	Chambers, Lee, Randolph
38	Kristin Nelson	Rep	Lanett	2026↑	Chambers, Lee
39	Ginny Shaver	Rep	Leesburg	2018	Cherokee, DeKalb
40	Chad Robertson	Rep	Heflin	2022	Calhoun, Cleburne
41	Corley Ellis	Rep	Columbiana	2016	Shelby
42	Ivan Smith	Rep	Clanton	2019↑	Autauga, Chilton
43	Arnold Mooney	Rep	Birmingham	2014	Shelby
44	Danny Garrett	Rep	Trussville	2014	Jefferson
45	Susan DuBose	Rep	Hoover	2022	Jefferson, Shelby, St. Clair
46	David Faulkner	Rep	Homewood	2014	Jefferson
47	Mike Shaw	Rep	Hoover	2022	Jefferson
48	Lloyd Peeples	Rep	Vestavia Hills	2026	Jefferson, Shelby
49	Russell Bedsole	Rep	Alabaster	2020↑	Bibb, Chilton, Shelby
50	Bill Morris	Rep	Moody	2026	St. Clair
51	Allen Treadaway	Rep	Morris	2006	Jefferson
52	GiGi Hayes	Dem	Birmingham	2026	Jefferson
53	Anthony Daniels	Dem	Huntsville	2014	Madison
54	Neil Rafferty	Dem	Birmingham	2018	Jefferson
55	Travis Hendrix	Dem	Birmingham	2023↑	Jefferson
56	Ontario Tillman	Dem	Bessemer	2022	Jefferson
57	Patrick Sellers	Dem	Birmingham	2022	Jefferson
58	Rolanda Hollis	Dem	Birmingham	2017↑	Jefferson
59	Mary Moore	Dem	Birmingham	2002	Jefferson
60	Alicia Escott Lumpkin	Dem	Birmingham	2026	Jefferson
61	Ron Bolton	Rep	Northport	2022	Pickens, Tuscaloosa
62	Bill Lamb	Rep	Tuscaloosa	2022	Tuscaloosa
63	Norman Crow	Rep	Tuscaloosa	2026↑	Tuscaloosa
64	Donna Givens	Rep	Loxley	2022	Baldwin
65	John Knapp	Rep	Tibbie	2026	Baldwin, Choctaw, Clarke, Washington
66	Alan Baker	Rep	Brewton	2006	Baldwin, Escambia
67	Prince Chestnut	Dem	Valley Grande	2017↑	Dallas, Perry
68	Thomas Jackson	Dem	Thomasville	1994	Clarke, Conecuh, Marengo, Monroe, Perry, Wilcox
69	Kelvin Lawrence	Dem	Hayneville	2014	Autauga, Lowndes, Montgomery, Wilcox
70	Christopher J. England	Dem	Tuscaloosa	2006	Tuscaloosa
71	Artis J. McCampbell	Dem	Demopolis	2006	Marengo, Pickens, Sumter, Tuscaloosa
72	Curtis Travis	Dem	Tuscaloosa	2022	Bibb, Greene, Hale, Tuscaloosa
73	Kenneth Paschal	Rep	Pelham	2021↑	Shelby
74	Jasmyne Crimiel	Dem	Montgomery	2026	Montgomery
75	Reed Ingram	Rep	Mathews	2014	Elmore, Montgomery
76	Patrice McClammy	Dem	Montgomery	2022↑	Montgomery
77	Tashina Morris	Dem	Montgomery	2018	Montgomery
78	Kenyatté Hassell	Dem	Montgomery	2021↑	Montgomery
79	Joe Lovvorn	Rep	Auburn	2016	Lee
80	Chris Blackshear	Rep	Smiths Station	2016	Lee, Russell
81	Ed Oliver	Rep	Alexander City	2018	Lee, Tallapoosa
82	Pebblin Warren	Dem	Tuskegee	2005↑	Lee, Macon
83	Jeremy Gray	Dem	Opelika	2018	Lee, Russell
84	Berry Forte	Dem	Clayton	2010	Barbour, Bullock, Russell
85	Rick Rehm	Rep	Dothan	2022	Henry, Houston
86	Paul Lee	Rep	Dothan	2010	Houston
87	Jeff Sorrells	Rep	Hartford	2018	Geneva, Houston
88	Jerry Starnes	Rep	Prattville	2022	Autauga, Elmore
89	Marcus Paramore	Rep	Troy	2022	Dale, Pike
90	Chris Sells	Rep	Greenville	2014	Butler, Coffee, Conecuh, Crenshaw, Montgomery
91	Jody Linton	Rep	Enterprise	2026	Coffee
92	Matthew Hammett	Rep	Dozier	2022	Coffee, Covington, Escambia
93	Steve Clouse	Rep	Ozark	1994	Dale, Houston
94	Jennifer Fidler	Rep	Fairhope	2022	Baldwin
95	Frances Holk-Jones	Rep	Foley	2022	Baldwin
96	Danielle Duggar	Rep	Daphne	2026	Baldwin
97	Adline Clarke	Dem	Mobile	2013↑	Mobile
98	Napoleon Bracy Jr.	Dem	Saraland	2010	Mobile
99	Sam Jones	Dem	Mobile	2018	Mobile
100	Mark Shirey	Rep	Mobile	2022	Mobile
101	Chris Pringle	Rep	Mobile	2014	Mobile
102	Shane Stringer	Rep	Mobile	2018	Baldwin, Mobile
103	Barbara Drummond	Dem	Mobile	2014	Mobile
104	Margie Wilcox	Rep	Mobile	2014	Mobile
105	Chip Brown	Rep	Mobile	2018	Mobile

- ↑ Member was first elected in a special election.

== Past composition of the House ==
Throughout most of the state's history, the Democratic Party has held the majority in the Alabama House of Representatives except for a few brief exceptions. The Whig Party controlled the lower house in 1819 and again from 1821 to 1823, and for the last time from 1837 to 1838.

After the Civil War and emancipation, granting of citizenship and the franchise to freedmen, most joined the Republican Party. Politics became competitive for several years. Republicans, white and black, held the majority of seats during the Reconstruction period from 1868 to 1870, and again from 1872 to 1874.

Among the House's historical firsts was the election of its first African-American members in 1868, when 27 black Republicans were elected. Among those African Americans elected to the lower house in 1872 was Rev. Mentor Dotson, a teacher. His granddaughter Helen Elsie Austin in 1930 was the first African-American woman to graduate from University of Cincinnati Law School, and in 1937 the first black and first woman to be appointed as state assistant attorney general of Ohio. She had a career as counsel to several federal agencies, was active in civil rights, and served a decade as a US Foreign Service officer in Africa.

Beginning in 1876, white Democrats regained control of the state house, through a combination of fraud, intimidation, and armed attacks on Republicans. At the turn of the 20th century, they passed laws that essentially disenfranchised both blacks and poor whites, causing a dramatic drop in voter rolls. Alabama white Democrats helped form the Solid South in Congress. For decades a failure to redistrict according to census returns resulted in the state legislature being dominated by rural counties and conservative Democrats.

In 1922 the first female member was elected to the State House: Hattie Hooker Wilkins of Dallas County, who served a single four-year term.

Some 136 years of Democratic control of the State House ended in November 2010. Beginning with the 2010 general election, Republicans swept to a large majority in the state house. They increased this margin in the elections in 2014 and 2018.

=== Session history ===
Election	Election map (Note: Results of preceding election, not including party switches or special elections.)	Speaker	Session dates	Composition (Note: At beginning of session.)		
Election	Election map	Speaker	Session dates	D	R	I
1994		James S. Clark (D)	March 7, 1995 – July 31, 1995	73	32	0
1994		James S. Clark (D)	February 6, 1996 – May 15, 1996	73	32	0
1994		James S. Clark (D)	February 4, 1997 – May 19, 1997	71	34	0
1994		James S. Clark (D)	January 13, 1998 – April 27, 1998	68	37	0
1998		Seth Hammett (D)	March 2, 1999 – June 9, 1999	69	36	0
1998		Seth Hammett (D)	February 1, 2000 – May 15, 2000	69	36	0
1998		Seth Hammett (D)	February 6, 2001 – May 21, 2001	68	37	0
1998		Seth Hammett (D)	January 8, 2002 – April 17, 2002	67	38	0
2002		Seth Hammett (D)	March 4, 2003 – June 16, 2003	63	42	0
2002		Seth Hammett (D)	February 3, 2004 – May 17, 2004	63	42	0
2002		Seth Hammett (D)	February 1, 2005 – May 16, 2005	63	42	0
2002		Seth Hammett (D)	January 10, 2006 – April 17, 2006	62	43	0
2006		Seth Hammett (D)	March 6, 2007 – June 7, 2007	62	43	0
2006		Seth Hammett (D)	February 5, 2008 – May 19, 2008	62	43	0
2006		Seth Hammett (D)	February 3, 2009 – May 15, 2009	62	43	0
2006		Seth Hammett (D)	January 12, 2010 – April 22, 2010	60	45	0
2010		Mike Hubbard (R)	March 1, 2011 – June 9, 2011	39	66	0
2010		Mike Hubbard (R)	February 7, 2012 – May 16, 2012	39	66	0
2010		Mike Hubbard (R)	February 5, 2013 – May 20, 2013	38	66	1
2010		Mike Hubbard (R)	January 14, 2014 – April 4, 2014	37	67	1
2014		Mike Hubbard (R)	March 3, 2015 – June 4, 2015	33	72	0
2014		Mike Hubbard (R)	February 2, 2016 – May 4, 2016	33	72	0
2014		Mac McCutcheon (R)	February 7, 2017 – May 19, 2017	33	72	0
2014		Mac McCutcheon (R)	January 9, 2018 – March 29, 2018	33	72	0
2018		Mac McCutcheon (R)	March 5, 2019 – May 31, 2019	28	77	0
2018		Mac McCutcheon (R)	February 4, 2020 – May 18, 2020	28	77	0
2018		Mac McCutcheon (R)	February 2, 2021 – May 17, 2021	28	77	0
2018		Mac McCutcheon (R)	January 11, 2022 – April 7, 2022	28	77	0
2022		Nathaniel Ledbetter (R)	March 7, 2023 – June 6, 2023	28	77	0
2022		Nathaniel Ledbetter (R)	February 6, 2024 – May 9, 2024	29	76	0

== See also ==
- Government of Alabama
- Alabama Senate
- Impeachment in Alabama
- Alabama Republican Party
- Alabama Democratic Party
