= Constitution of Alabama =

American state constitution

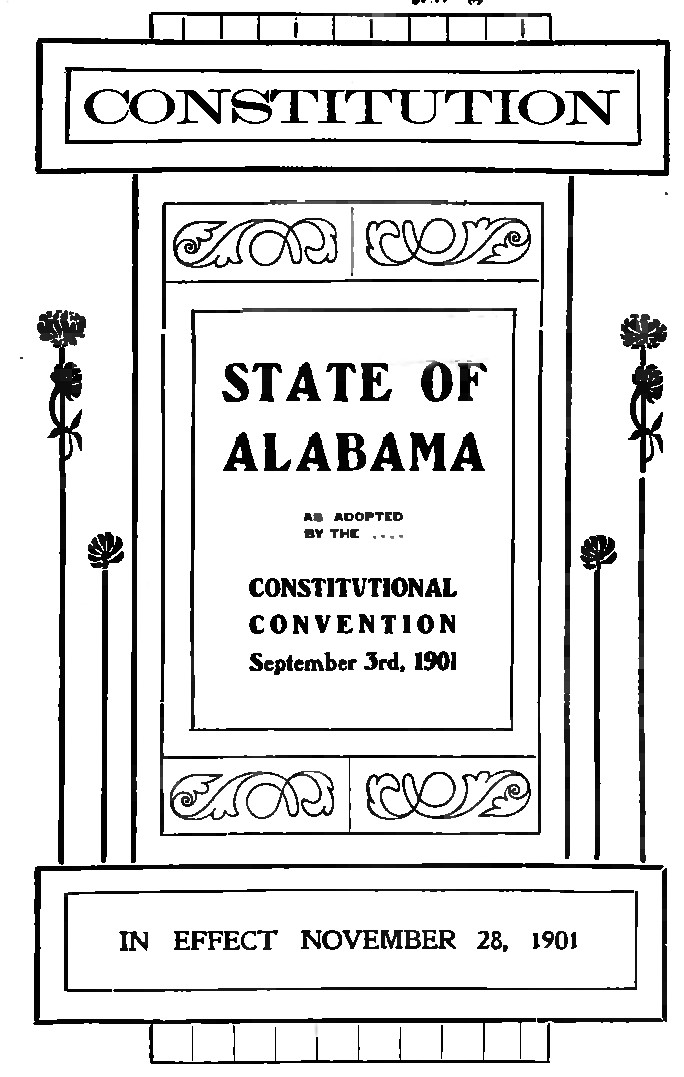
Constitution of Alabama- Frontispiece

The Constitution of the State of Alabama is the state constitution of the U.S. state of Alabama. It was adopted on November 28, 2022, as a recodification of the Alabama Constitution of 1901 which had been in effect since November 28, 1901, with the current version being Alabama's seventh constitution, making it the most recent of the 50 U.S. state constitutions.

The Constitution of Alabama is currently the longest active written constitution in the world at 369,380 words, more than two-and-a-half times the length of the second-longest, the English-language version of the Constitution of India.

== History ==
Alabama has had seven constitutions to date, all but the current one established via State Conventions: 1819 (converting Alabama Territory into a State), 1861 (Secession), 1865 (Reconstruction), 1868 (Reconstruction), 1875 (ending Reconstruction), 1901 (Jim Crow) and the current document, adopted in 2022. Governor Kay Ivey formally proclaimed the new constitution to be in effect on Monday, November 28, 2022, shortly after the state's election results were certified.

== Recompilation of the Alabama Constitution of 1901 ==
The current Alabama Constitution is a recompilation of the Alabama Constitution of 1901. The recompilation had five objectives, as follows:

- arranging it in proper articles, parts, and sections;
- removing all racist language (examples of racist language being removed included Section 102 of Article IV of the former Constitution, which forbade "marriage between any white person and a Negro, or descendant of a negro".);
- deleting duplicative and repealed provisions;
- consolidating provisions regarding economic development; and
- arranging all local amendments by county of application.

== General overview ==
The Alabama Constitution, in common with all other state constitutions, defines a tripartite government organized under a presidential system. Executive power is vested in the Governor of Alabama, legislative power in the Alabama State Legislature (bicameral, composed of the Alabama House of Representatives and Alabama Senate), and judicial power in the Judiciary of Alabama.

Even after the recompilation of the constitution and the removal of obsolete, duplicative, and overtly racist provisions, the constitution is still the longest in America at an estimated 369,380 words, being more than three times the length of the Constitution of Texas. Further, many of the issues which plagued the 1901 Constitution still exist, including the heavy centralization of power at the state level over local issues (Note: As an example, 37 entire pages are devoted solely to issues involving Mobile County, Alabama.) and a large part of the tax code (both at the state and local levels) being written into the constitution itself.
