= List of Confederate monuments and memorials in Alabama =

Confederate monuments and memorials in Alabama

This is a list of Confederate monuments and memorials in Alabama that were established as public displays and symbols of the Confederate States of America (CSA), Confederate leaders, or Confederate soldiers of the American Civil War. Part of the commemoration of the American Civil War, these symbols include monuments and statues, flags, holidays and other observances, and the names of schools, roads, parks, bridges, counties, cities, lakes, dams, military bases, and other public works. (Note: "In an effort to assist the efforts of local communities to re-examine these symbols, the SPLC launched a study to catalog them. For the final tally, the researchers excluded nearly 2,600 markers, battlefields, museums, cemeteries and other places or symbols that are largely historical in nature.")

This list does not include items which are largely historic in nature such as historic markers or battlefield parks if they were not established to honor the Confederacy. Nor does it include figures connected with the origins of the Civil War or white supremacy, but not with the Confederacy.

== Monuments and memorials ==
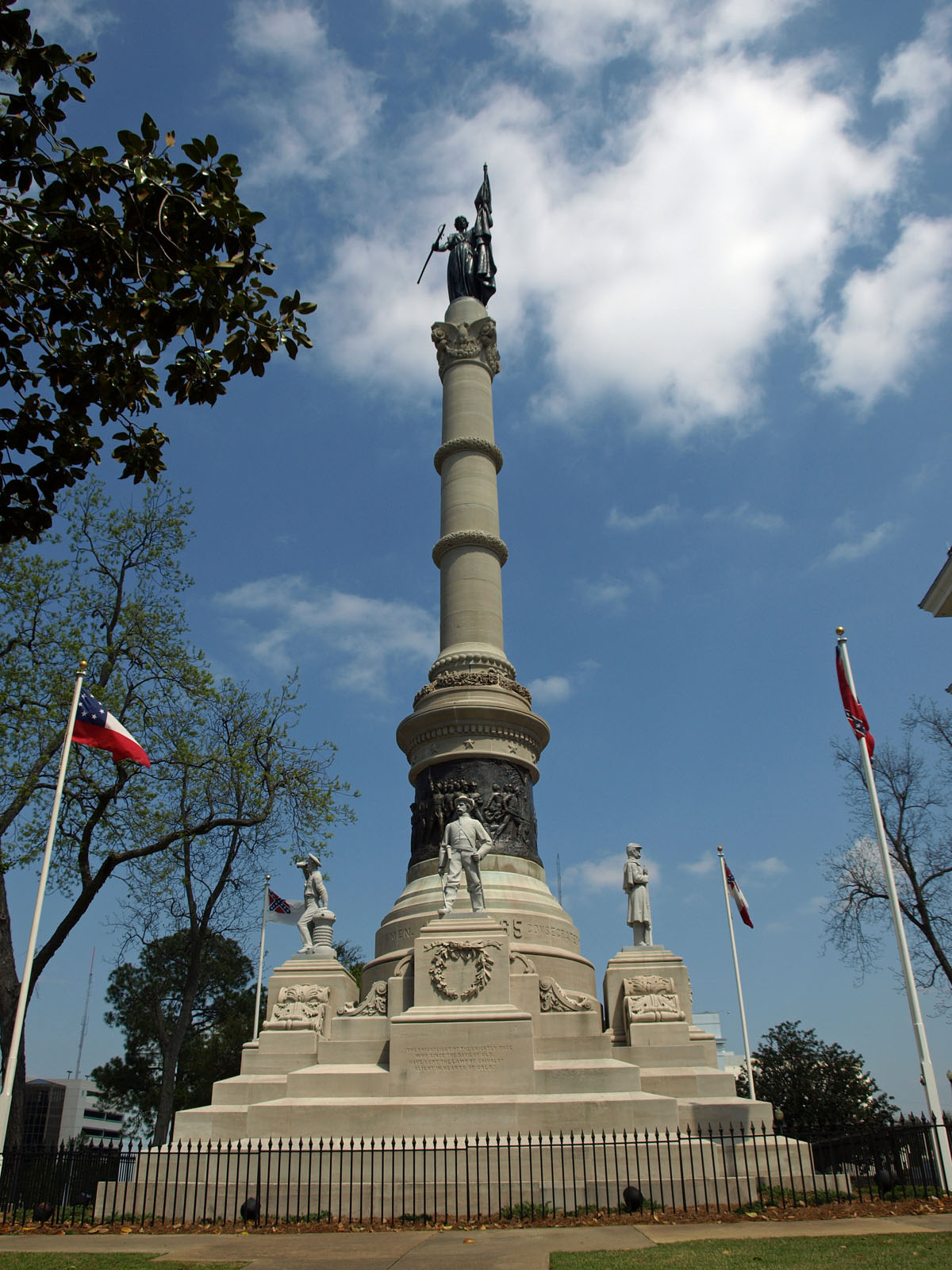
Monument to Confederate Soldiers and Sailors, by Alabama by sculptor Alexander Doyle, at the Alabama State Capitol

As of 24 June 2020, there are at least 122 public spaces with Confederate monuments in Alabama.

The 2017 Alabama Memorial Preservation Act was passed to require local governments to obtain state permission before removing Confederate monuments and memorials.

=== State capitol ===
- Confederate Memorial Monument, also known as the "Monument to Confederate Soldiers and Sailors" (1898). On June 24, 2015, in the wake of the Charleston church shooting on June 17, 2015, on the order of Governor Robert J. Bentley, the four Confederate flags, and their poles, were removed.
- Jefferson Davis Presidential Star, marble portico (1897). "Placed by the Sophie Bibb Chapter Daughters of the Confederacy on the Spot where Jefferson Davis Stood when Inaugurated President of the C.S.A. Feb. 18, 1861"
- Jefferson Davis (1940), by UDC
- John Allan Wyeth – M.D., L.L.D., marker. Fought in Confederate Army.

=== State symbols ===
Coat of arms of Alabama

Flag of the Governor since 1939

- Alabama Coat of Arms (1923) and the State Seal include the Confederate Battle Flag.
- Alabama State Flag (1895) The Alabama Department of Archives and History found in 1915 that the flag was meant to "preserve in permanent form some of the more distinctive features of the Confederate battle flag, particularly the St. Andrew's cross." According to historian John M. Coski, the adoption of Alabama's flag coincided with the rise of Jim Crow laws and segregation, as other former Confederate slave states, such as Mississippi and Florida, also adopted new state flags based on Confederate designs around the same time when those states instituted Jim Crow segregation laws themselves:
- The Governor's version of the State Flag includes St Andrew's Cross plus the State Coat of Arms with the Confederate Battle Flag inclusion and the military crest on the bottom.

=== State holidays ===
- Robert E. Lee Day, celebrated together with Martin Luther King Jr. Day on the third Monday in January
- Confederate Memorial Day, celebrated the fourth Monday in April
- Jefferson Davis Day, Celebrated the first Monday in June

=== Buildings ===
- Montgomery: First White House of the Confederacy

=== Monuments ===
==== Courthouse monuments ====
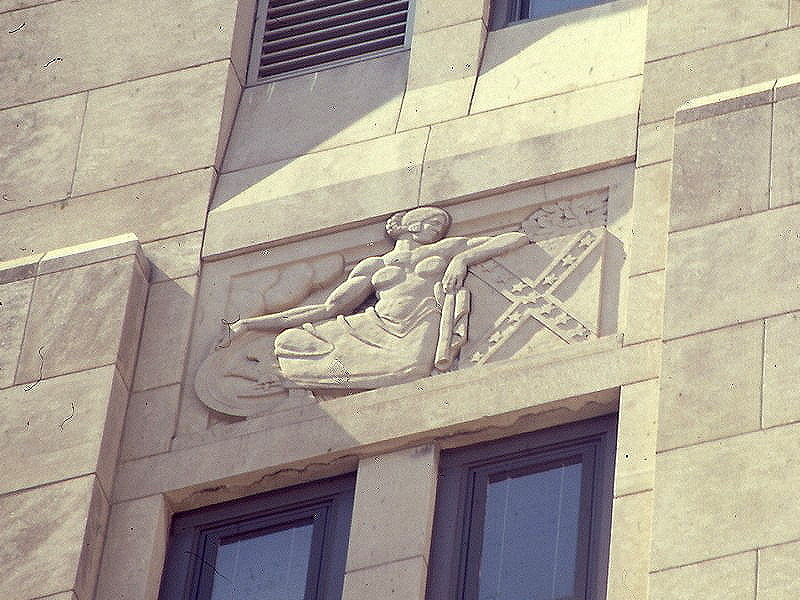
Panel on Jefferson County Court House, Birmingham, 1932

Pickens County War Memorial in Carrollton

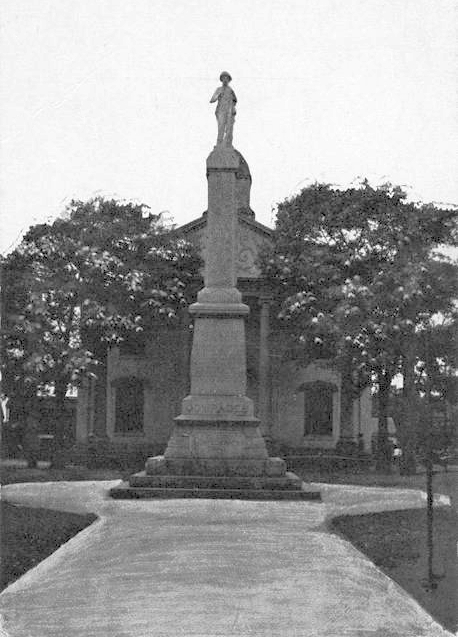
Confederate Monument, Clayton (circa 1910)

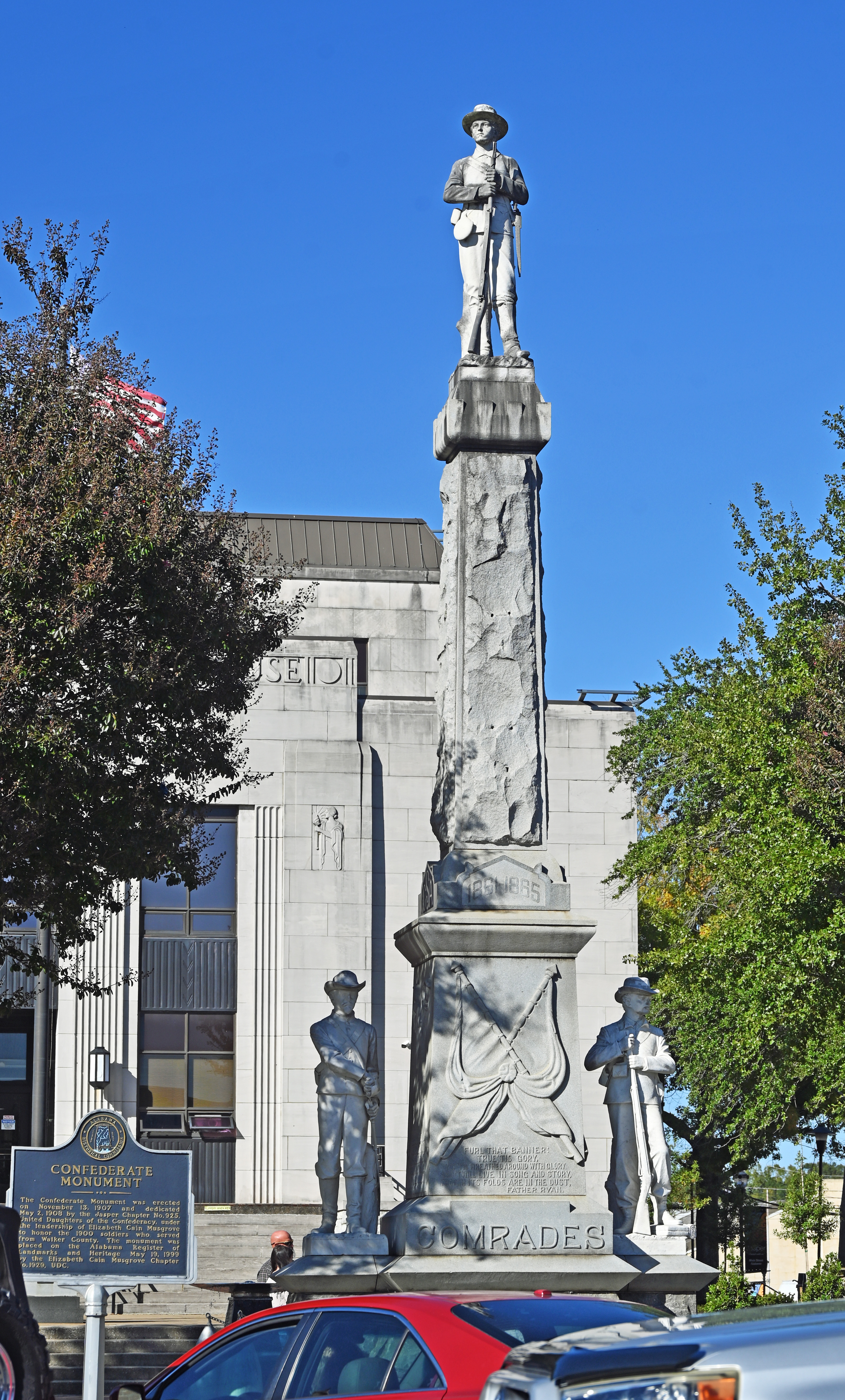
Confederate Monument in Jasper, Alabama, showing cavalryman and infantryman

- Ashville: Confederate Soldiers of Ashville Monument, St. Clair County Courthouse (1923) by United Daughters of the Confederacy, (UDC) Ashville Chapter.
- Athens: Limestone County Confederate Soldiers Memorial, Limestone County Courthouse (1922) by United Confederate Veterans (UCV) and UDC.
- Butler: Confederate Monument, Choctaw County Courthouse (1936) by UDC, Choctaw Ruffin Dragoon Chapter.
- Carrollton: Confederate War Memorial, Pickens County Courthouse (1927).
- Centre: Confederate Memorial, Cherokee County Courthouse (1988) by SCV, Emma Sansom Camp No. 27.
- Centreville: Confederate Monument, Bibb County Courthouse (1910) by UDC, Leonard Calloway Pratt Chapter No. 1056.
- Clayton: Confederate Monument (1909); UDC monument at Barbour County Courthouse Square.
- Decatur: Confederate Monument, near Morgan County Courthouse (1922) by UDC, Joe Wheeler Chapter No. 291.
- Fayette: Confederate Monument, Fayette County Courthouse (1929) by UDC, Fayette Chapter.
- Florence: Confederate Monument, Lauderdale County Courthouse (1903) Ladies Memorial Association.
- Greensboro: Confederate Monument, Hale County Courthouse (1904) Ladies Memorial Association of Greensboro.
- Jasper: Confederate Monument, Walker County Courthouse (1907) Jasper County Chapter 925 by UDC.
- Livingston: Confederate Monument, Sumter County Courthouse (1908) by UDC, Sumter Chapter.
- Marion: UDC Monument at Marion Courthouse Square to Nicola Marschall, designer of the original Confederate flag and Confederate uniform. In Marion there is also a pre-Civil War monument to the faithful slave.
- Moulton: Confederate Monument, Lawrence County Courthouse (2006) by SCV, Lt. J. K. McBride Camp No. 241 and the Alabama Division.
- Tuscumbia: Confederate Veterans Monument, Colbert County Courthouse (1911) by UDC, Tuscumbia Chapter.

==== Other public monuments ====
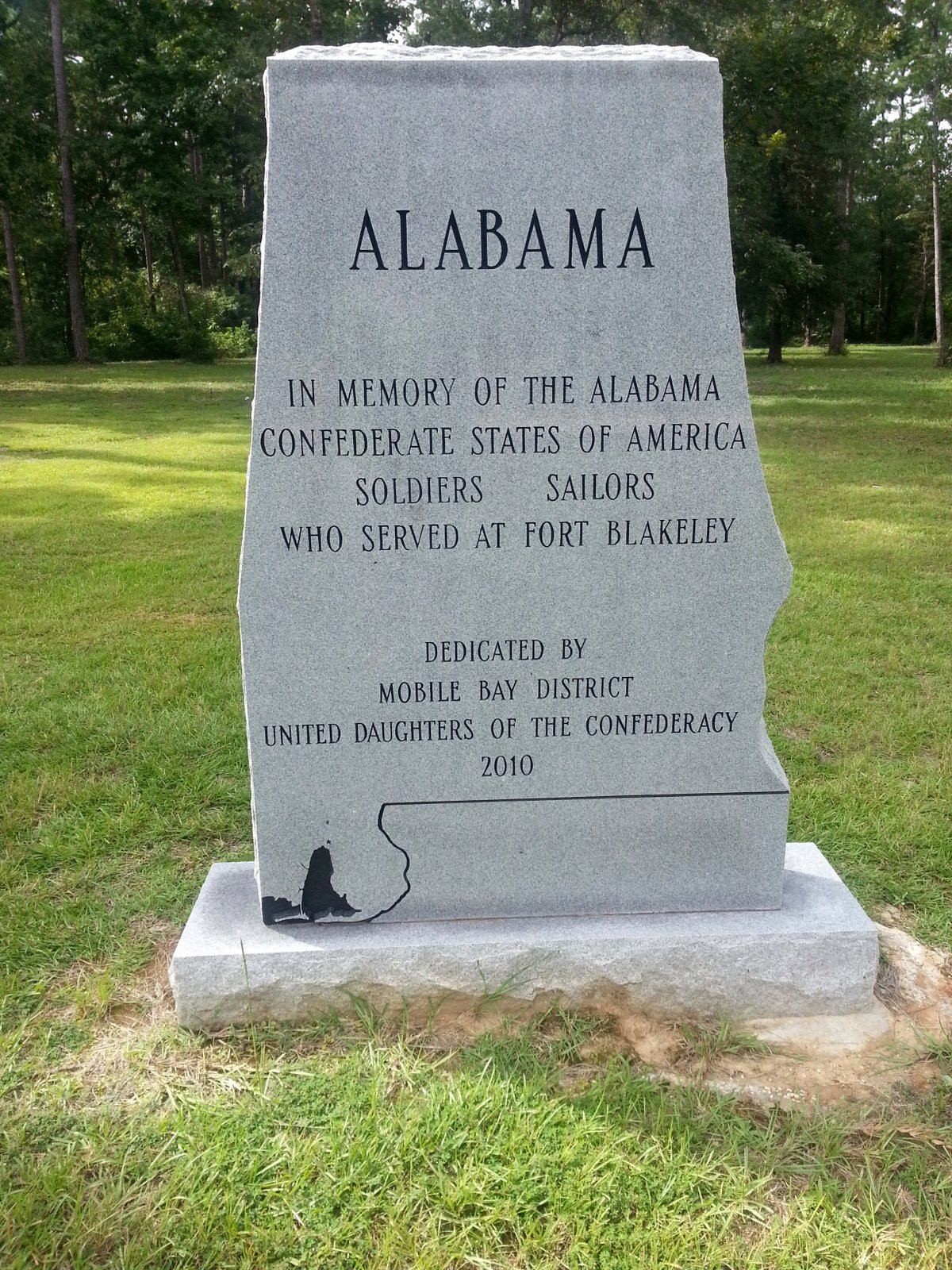
Confederate monument at Blakeley, Alabama

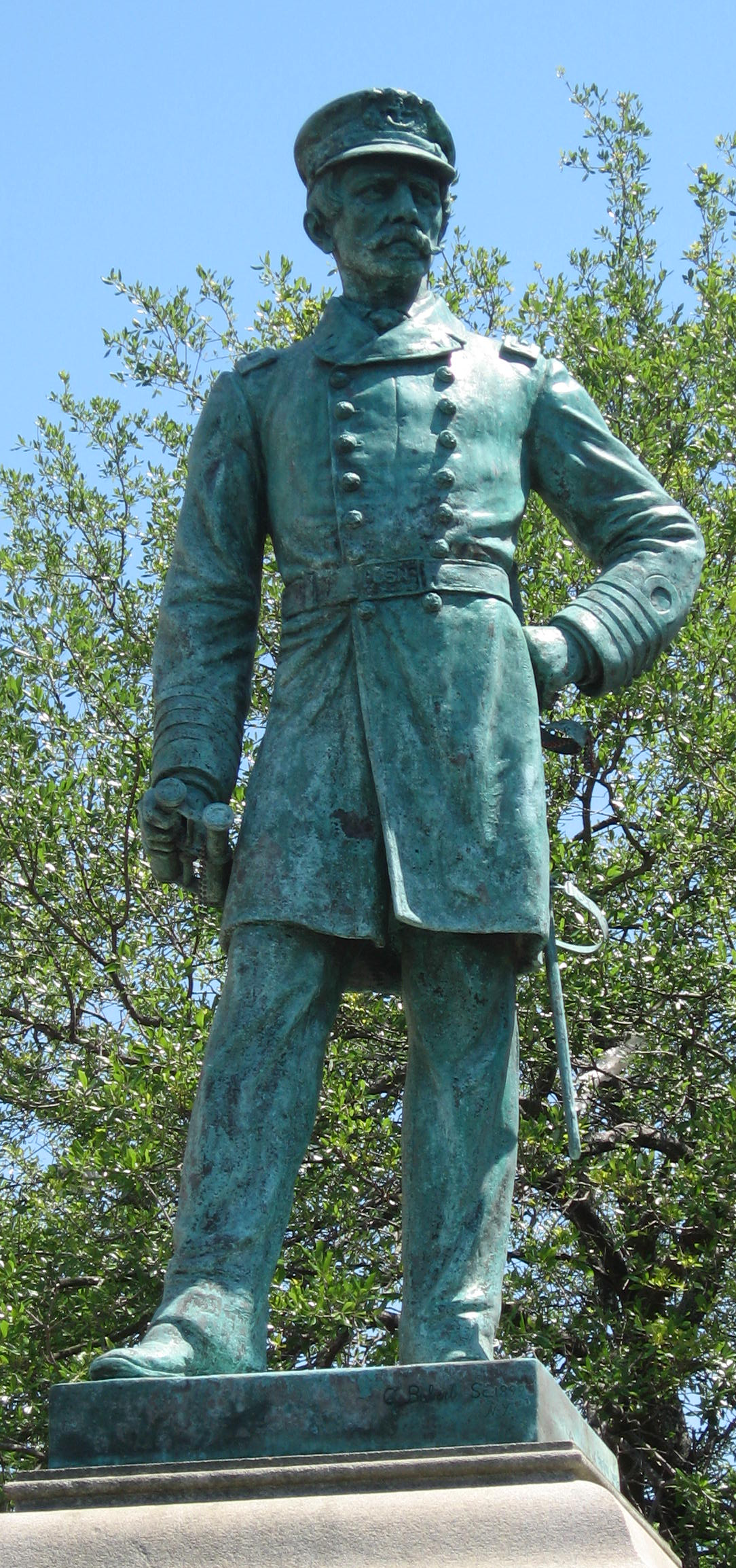
Raphael Semmes monument in Mobile, Alabama by sculptor Caspar Buberl

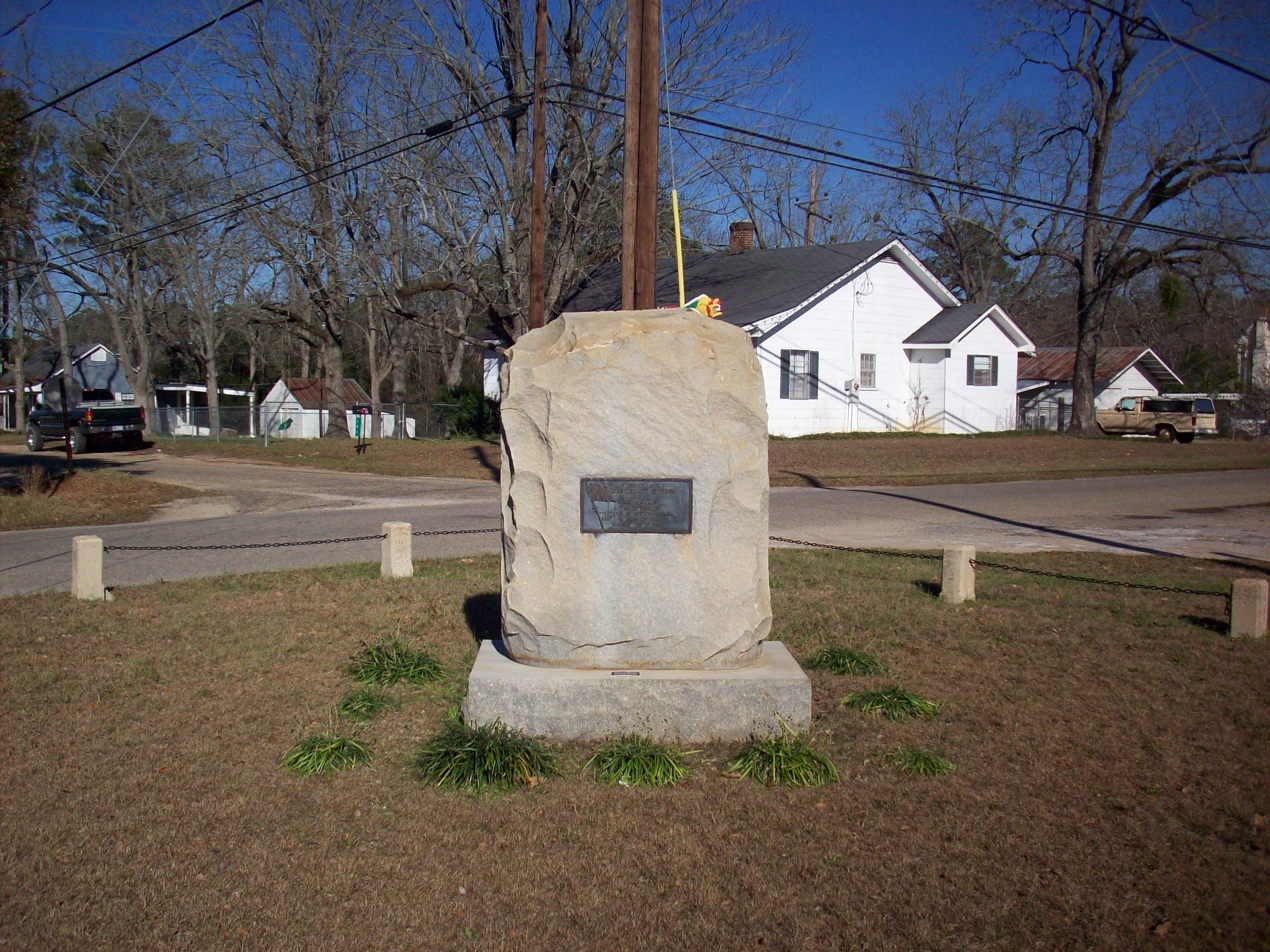
Monument to the Confederate victory in the Battle of Newton, Newton, Alabama

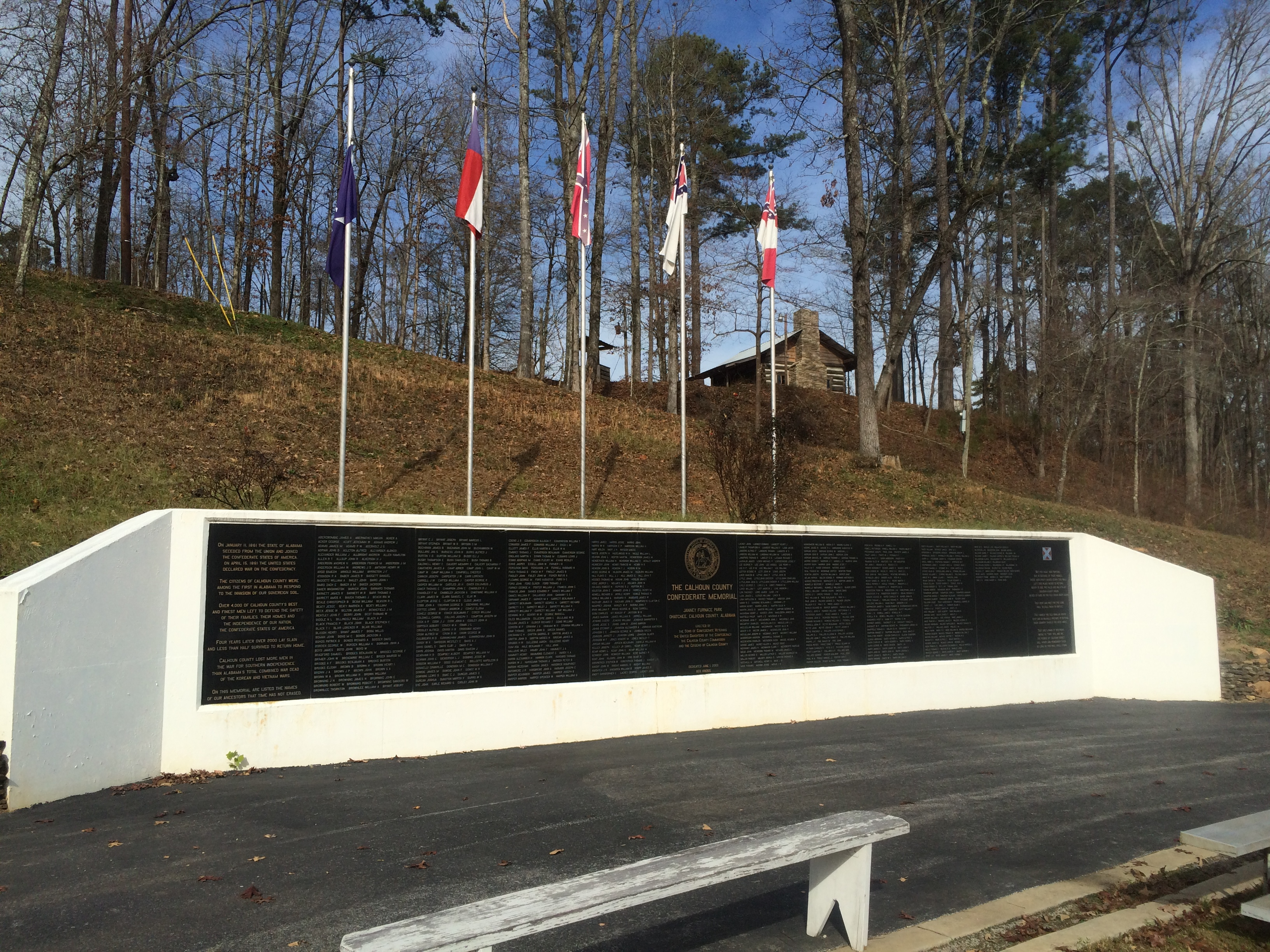
Calhoun County Confederate Memorial in Ohatchee, Alabama

- Anniston: Major John Pelham Monument, Quintard Avenue (1905) through the efforts of Clarence J. Owens, president of Anniston College for Young Ladies. Removed in 2020.
- Athens: Limestone County Confederate Soldiers Memorial, Athens City Cemetery (1909) by UDC, Joseph E. Johnston Chapter
- Birmingham: Confederacy Rock, University of Alabama, (1914) by UDC Alabama Division, to commemorate University of Alabama students who served in the Confederate Army. The Board of Trustees of The University of Alabama ordered the Rock and its plaques removed on June 15, 2020.
- Blakeley: UDC monument (2010) at Historic Blakeley State Park dedicated to Confederate soldiers and sailors who served at Fort Blakeley
- Demopolis:
  - Confederate Monument (1910). The statue was toppled on July 16, 2016 when a policeman accidentally crashed his patrol car into the monument; the statue fell from its pedestal and was heavily damaged. In 2017, the Demopolis city council voted 3–2 to move the damaged Confederate statue to a local museum and to install a new obelisk memorial that honors both the Union and the Confederate soldiers.
  - Breastworks Confederate Memorial (1941)
  - Confederate Square, as it was named in 1923 at the request of the UDC, remains the official name of the Demopolis Town Square.
- Eufaula: Confederate Monument (1905) by UDC, Barbour County Chapter
- Fort Mitchell: Inscription on the horse mounting stone of CSA General James Cantey, at Fort Mitchell National Cemetery
- Fort Payne: Confederate Monument (1913) by UDC and SCV of DeKalb County, Alabama
- Gadsden:
  - Emma Sansom and Nathan Bedford Forrest Monument (1907) by UDC, Gadsden Chapter.
  - Turkey Town Monument (1992) by SCV, Turkey Town Valley Camp #1512
- Greenville: Butler County Confederate Memorial, "Our Confederate Dead", at Confederate Park (1903) by UDC of Butler County, Alabama, Father Ryan Chapter
- Hamilton: Confederate Veterans Bicentennial Memorial (1977)
- Hayneville: Soldiers of Lowndes County Who Died in Service, Hayneville Town Square
- Headland: Henry County Confederate Memorial (1936) by UDC, Headland Chapter No. 1673
- Huntsville: Confederate Soldier Memorial, erected near the Madison County Courthouse (1905) by UDC. Moved to Maple Hill Cemetery in 2020.
- Jacksonville: Confederate Monument, Jacksonville Town Square (1909). Bears a quote from Jefferson Davis: "Let none of the survivors of these men offer in their behalf the penitential plea, 'They believed they were right.' Be it ours to transmit to posterity our unequivocal confidence in the righteousness of the cause for which these men died."
- Lowndesboro: Our Confederate Soldiers Monument (1929) by the Lowndesboro Chapter of UDC of Lowndes County, Alabama.
- Midway:
  - Granite boulder marker at Hwy 82 & 51 erected to commemorate the Jefferson Davis Highway and Soldiers of the Confederacy
  - Confederate Memorial Marker at corner of Hwy 82 and Main Street in honour of Midway Guards prior drill grounds erected by UDC (1960)
- Millbrook: Robinson Springs Camp Confederate Monument (1913) by UCV Camp No. 396, Elmore County, Alabama
- Mobile:
  - Statue of Admiral Raphael Semmes, on Government Street near the Bankhead Tunnel (1900) by SCV, Raphael Semmes Camp 11 Removed June 5, 2020.
  - Confederate Fortification Monument (1940), Mobile National Cemetery
- Montgomery:
  - State Capitol. See above.
  - UDC monument (1942) on Dexter Avenue: "Along this street moved the inaugural parade of Jefferson Davis when he took the oath of office as President of the Confederate States of America February 18, 1861. Dixie was played as a band arrangement for the first time on this occasion."
  - Robert E. Lee statue, Robert E. Lee High School (1908)
- Munford: A. J. Buttram Monument (1914) by UDC, John Tyler Morgan Chapter
- Opelika: Confederate Monument (1911) by UDC, Robert E. Lee Chapter
- Newton: Monument dedicated to the Confederate victory in the Battle of Newton
- Ohatchee: Calhoun County Confederate Memorial (2003) at Janney Furnace Park, "the world's largest black granite Confederate Memorial"
- Ozark: Dale County Confederate Soldiers Monument (1910) Stonewall Jackson Chapter by UDC No. 667 of Dale County, Alabama
- Prattville:
  - Confederate Monument, City Hall Square (1908) by UDC
  - UDC monument (1916) to Prattville Dragoons, on grounds of Prattville Primary School
- Rogersville: CSA Gen. Joseph Wheeler Monument, Joe Wheeler State Park (2006) by SCV, Freeman's Battery Forrest's Artillery Camp No. 1939

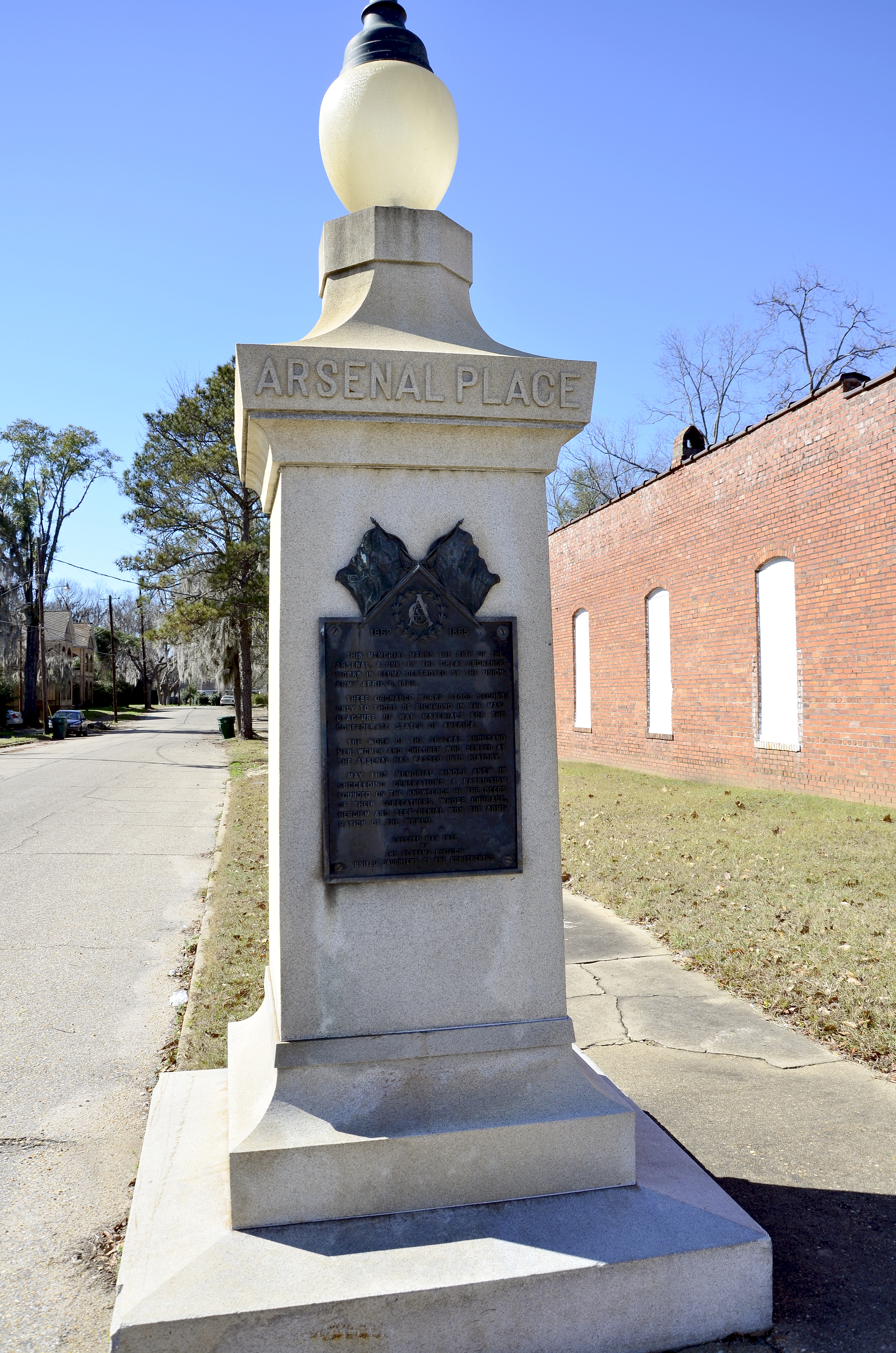
"Arsenal Place" memorial in Selma, Alabama

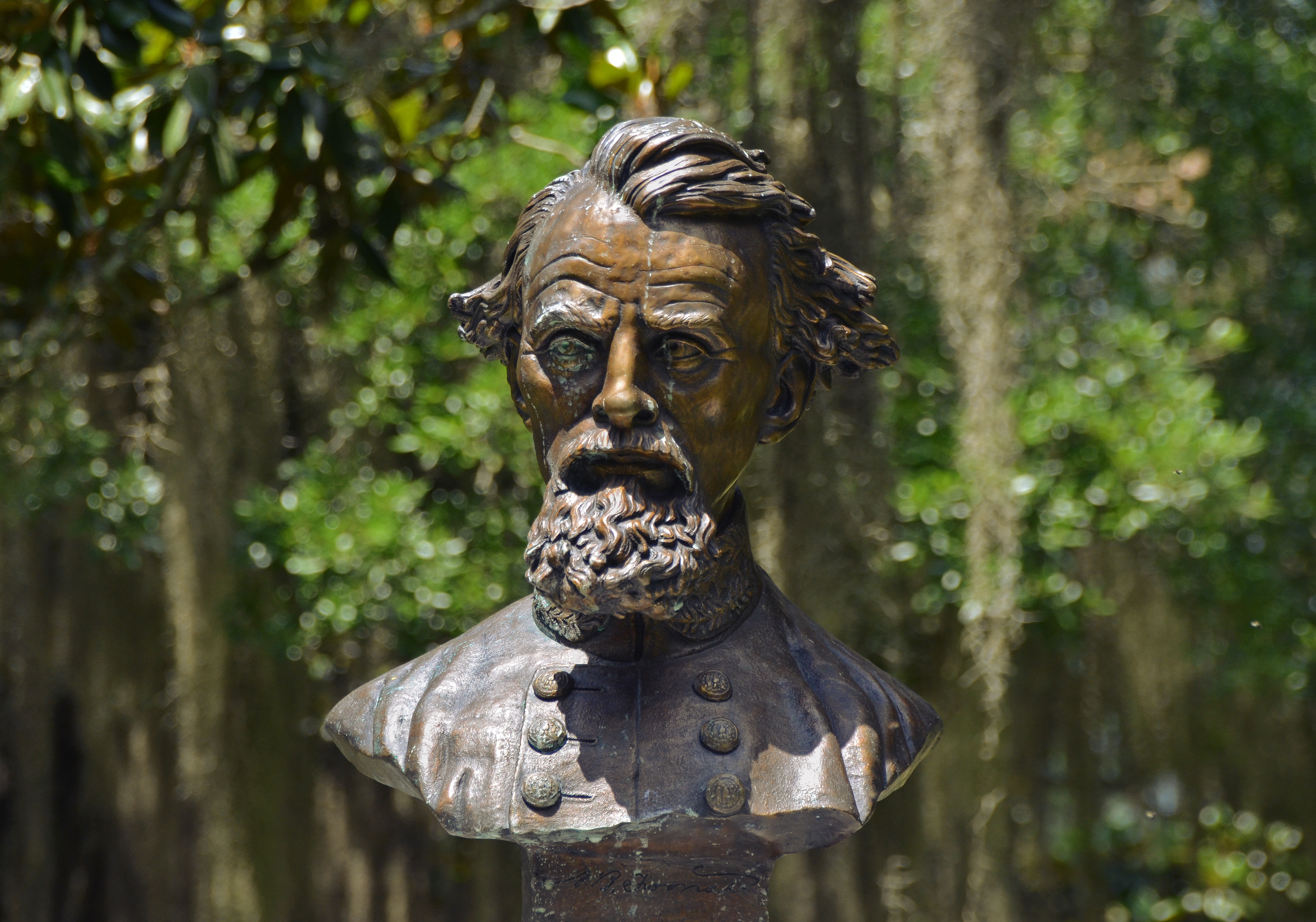
Bust of Nathan Bedford Forrest in Old Live Oak Cemetery.

- Selma:
  - The Edmund Pettus Bridge (1940), on US Route 80, is named for Edmund Pettus, Confederate General and Alabama Grand Dragon of the KKK. This is the beginning of the Selma to Montgomery National Historic Trail (1996), commemorating the Selma to Montgomery civil rights marches of 1965.
  - Defense of Selma Memorial (1907) by UDC
  - Memorial boulder marking The Selma Ordnance and Naval Foundry "destroyed by the Federals 1865," placed "in honor of the memory of hundreds of faithful men who made these great works a base for war material for the entire Confederate Army and Navy." (1917) Alabama Division United Daughters of Confederacy.
  - "Arsenal Place" memorial (1931), marking the site of the Confederate ordnance works "destroyed by the Union Army April 6, 1865"
  - A memorial arch on the grounds of the Federal Building honors Confederate Generals and Senators John Tyler Morgan and Edmund Pettus
  - Old Live Oak Cemetery, a Selma city-owned property, incorporates various features including:
    - Jefferson Davis Memorial Chair – an inscribed stone chair
    - Confederate Memorial Circle (1878) Confederate Memorial Association
    - The Nathan Bedford Forrest Bust Monument (2000). Built partly with city funds, sponsored by Friends of Forrest and UDC. It was first located at the Vaughan-Smitherman Museum, but during protest over Forrest's KKK links trash was dumped on it and it was damaged during an apparent attempt to remove the bust from its foundation. It was then moved to the Cemetery's Confederate Circle. The bust was then stolen in 2012 and has not been recovered, despite a $20,000 reward; the present bust is a replacement. The base is inscribed, under a Confederate flag: "Defender of Selma, Wizard of the Saddle, untutored genius, the first with the most. This monument stands as testament of our perpetual devotion and respect to Lt. Gen. Nathan Bedford Forrest, C.S.A., 1821-1877, one of the South's finest heroes. In honor of Gen. Forrest's unwavering defense of Selma, the great state of Alabama, and the Confederacy, this memorial is dedicated. Deo vindice."
    - A Confederate Soldier Monument (pre-1881) with cannons protecting it
    - Graves and memorials to four CSA generals: John Tyler Morgan, Edmund Winston Pettus, Nathaniel H. R. Dawson, William J. Hardee and Confederate Navy Commander Catesby ap Roger Jones
    - A building historically used for concerts and Confederate Memorial Day celebrations
    - Elodie Todd Dawson Monument (sister-in-law to President Lincoln, strong advocate for the Confederacy)
- Tallassee
  - Confederate Armory. When Richmond was threatened by Union troops, the Confederacy moved its armory to Tallassee. It is the only Confederate armory to survive the war. Only the brick shell of the large building survives. There is a historical marker.
  - Confederate Officers' Quarters, 301, 303 (demolished), 305, and 307 King Street. Made necessary by the relocation of the armory. After the Civil War, Confederate Brigadier-General Birkett Davenport Fry lived at 301 King Street until 1880. The building is currently used as a law firm office, but there is a historical marker.
- Troy: "Comrades" Confederate Monument (1908) Pike Monumental Association, UCV, and UDC of Pike County, Alabama
- Tuscaloosa: University of Alabama Civil War Memorial, South entrance of the University of Alabama's Amelia Gayle Gorgas Library (1914) by UDC, Alabama Division
- Tuscaloosa County: UDC monument (1977) at Tannehill Ironworks, where Confederate munitions and iron were manufactured

==== Private monuments ====
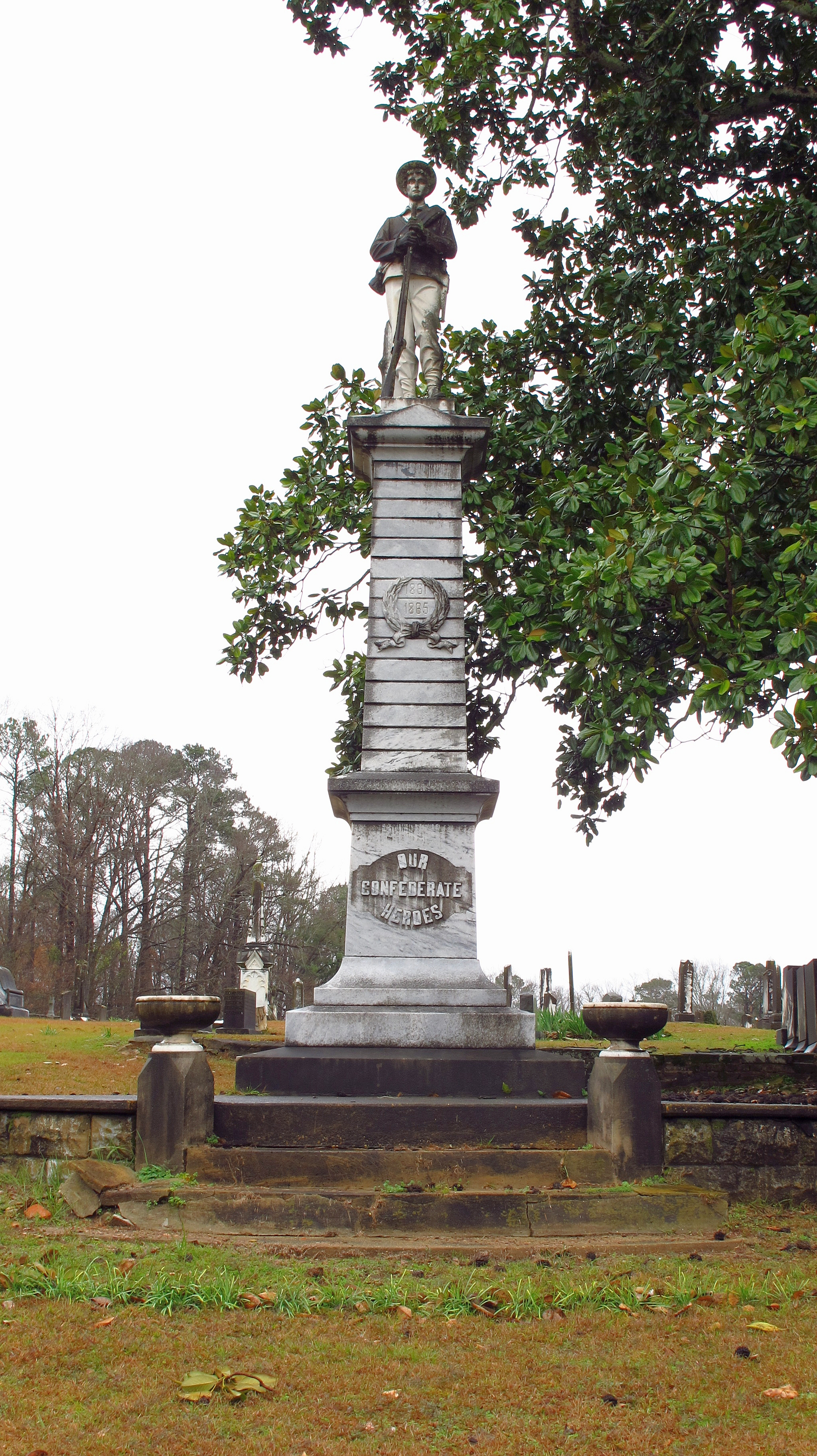
Mesopotamia Cemetery, Eutaw, Alabama

- Auburn: Auburn Guard Monument, Pine Hill Cemetery (1893) Ladies Memorial Association, forerunner of UDC
- Birmingham: Confederate Monument, Elmwood Cemetery (1906), UCV, Camp Hardee
- Boligee: Confederate Monument, Bethsalem Cemetery (1896) Ladies Memorial Association
- Calera: Shelby Springs Memorial
- Camden: Confederate Monument (1880) Ladies Memorial and Wilcox Monumental Associations, Wilcox County, Alabama
- Crenshaw County, near Brantley: In August, 2017, the new Unknown Alabama Confederate Soldiers Monument was installed in Confederate Veterans Memorial Park on Route 331, 3 miles north of Brantley. The park, established in 2015, is privately owned.
- Eutaw: Confederate monument in Mesopotamia Cemetery.
- Gainesville:
  - Confederate Dead Monument, Gainesville Cemetery (1876) Ladies Memorial Association of Gainesville
  - Forrest Confederate Monument (1923) by UDC
- Jacksonville: The Gallant Pelham Statue, Jacksonville City Cemetery (1905) by UDC, John H. Forney Chapter
- Mobile: Confederate Rest and Monument, Magnolia Cemetery (1874)
- Plattville: marker in front of Mulbry Grove Cottage, the "meeting place where the Prattville Dragoons, a Civil War unit, was organized in 1861.
- Talladega: Confederate Memorial. Oak Hill Cemetery
- Tuscaloosa: Confederate Monument, Greenwood Cemetery (1880) by the Ladies Memorial Association
- Tuskegee: Tuskegee Confederate Monument, erected October 6, 1906 by UDC of Macon County, Alabama. The UDC owns both the monument and the town park it is located in. There have been several unsuccessful attempts to tear it down or have it removed legally. As of 2018, the UDC has stopped removing spray-painted defacement, "because it would only be repeated".
- Union Springs: Confederate Monument, Old City Cemetery (The Confederate Cemetery) (1893) Ladies Memorial Association
- Wetumpka: Wetumpka Light Guards Memorial

=== Inhabited places ===
- Bullock County (1866) named for secessionist politician and CSA Col. Edward Bullock
- Chilton County (1868) named for William Parish Chilton, judge and member of the Confederate Provisional Congress
- City of Clanton (1866) seat of Chilton County named for CSA Brig. Gen. James H. Clanton
- Cleburne County (1866) named for CSA Maj. Gen. Patrick Cleburne
- Hale County (1867) named for CSA Lt. Col. Stephen F. Hale; also a member of the Provisional Confederate States Congress
- Lee County (1866) named for Robert E. Lee.
- Beauregard, Alabama (unincorporated) in Lee County named for CSA Gen. P.G.T. Beauregard
- Wheeler, Alabama (unincorporated), location of the National Register of Historic Places-listed Joseph Wheeler Plantation, both named for the Confederate General Joseph Wheeler.

=== Parks, water features and dams ===
- Brantley: Confederate Veterans Memorial Park, privately owned
- Demopolis: Confederate Park is the town square named so in 1923 at the request of UDC.
- Florence: McFarland Park and Recreation Area, named for Confederate Maj. Robert McFarland
- Greenville: Confederate Park (1910)
- Marbury: Confederate Memorial Park. The site operated as the Old Soldiers Home for Confederate Veterans from 1902 to 1939. In 1964, the Alabama State Legislature established the memorial park, which now hosts a museum and archives
- Miami: Robert E. Lee Park
- Mountain Creek: Confederate Memorial Park and Alabama Confederate Soldiers Home
- Rogersville: Joe Wheeler State Park (1949) beside Wheeler Lake and Wheeler Dam all named for Confederate General and U.S. Congressman Joseph Wheeler

=== Roads ===
- Anniston: Quintard Avenue
- Dauphin Island: Beauregard Street
- Fair Hope: Jeff Davis Street
- Gardendale: Robert E. Lee Drive
- Hodges: Robert E. Lee Drive
- Leeds: Robert E. Lee Street
- Livingston:
  - Forrest Drive
  - Hood Street, named for CSA Lt. Gen. John Bell Hood
  - Jefferson Davis Drive
  - Lee Street
  - Longstreet Drive, named for CSA Gen. James Longstreet.
  - Morgan Drive, named for CSA Gen. John Hunt Morgan
  - Stonewall Street
- McCalla: Confederate Parkway
- Millbrook: Robert E. Lee Drive
- Mobile:
  - Beauregard Street
  - Forrest Street
  - Johnston Street, named for CSA Gen. Albert Sidney Johnston
  - Polk Street, named for CSA Lt. Gen. Leonidas Polk
  - Robert E. Lee Street
  - Van Dorn Street, named for CSA Maj. Gen. Earl Van Dorn
- Montgomery:
  - Beauregard Street
  - Early Street
  - Jefferson Davis Avenue
- Ozark:
  - Jeb Stuart Court
  - Stonewall Circle
- Selma:
  - Forrest Avenue
- Trussville: Robert Lee Street

=== Schools ===
- Huntsville: Lee High School (1957), home to the Lee Generals
- Montgomery:
  - Jefferson Davis High School (1968)
  - Sidney Lanier High School (1910)
- Opelika:
  - Beauregard Elementary School (2001) new campus on Lee County Rd 300 constructed, previously shared location with high school
  - Beauregard High School (1923)
- Satsuma: Robert E. Lee Elementary School
- Selma:
  - John Tyler Morgan Academy, a segregation academy founded in 1965
- Skipperville: G.W. Long High School, home of the Rebels, who formerly used a variant of Ole Miss's "Colonel Reb" Logo
- Vestavia Hills: Vestavia Hills High School, home of the Rebels. Until 2017, the school mascot was the Rebel Man, a Confederate Flag-waving Civil War rebel and plantation owner

=== City symbols ===
- Mobile: city flag includes the city seal which incorporates the third national flag of the Confederacy along with other flags.
