= List of killings by law enforcement officers in the United States in the 1920s =

This is a list of people reported killed by non-military law enforcement officers in the United States in the 1920s century, whether in the line of duty or not, and regardless of reason or method. The listing documents the occurrence of a death, making no implications regarding wrongdoing or justification on the part of the person killed or officer involved. Killings are arranged by date of the incident that caused death. Different death dates, if known, are noted in the description. This page lists 100 people.

== 1920s ==
The table below lists 100 people.

Date	Name (age) of deceased	State (city)	Description
1929-12-28	William "Dinky" Quan (28)	Illinois (Chicago)	
1929-12-28	William Wilson (33)	Illinois (Chicago)	
1929-12-28	William Ryan	Illinois (Chicago)	
1929-12-18	Julian Rachel	Illinois (Bloomington)	
1929-08-07	Joseph Mair (20)	Minnesota (Minneapolis)	
1928-05-07	O.A. Morrisey	California (San Diego)	
1929-05-07	Stephen Koriwcerc (35)	Illinois (Chicago)	
1929-04-24	Ottmer Herman Fleming (21)	Washington, DC	
1928-12-26	Joseph "Frank" Orlando (28)	Illinois (Chicago)	
1928-04-06	Emmett Winfrey (20)	Missouri (St. Louis)	
1928-03-28	Mrs. Deking	Illinois (Aurora)	
1928-02-28	John Jackman (19)	Michigan (Detroit)	
1928-01-09	John "Jack Rabbit" Bunk	Illinois (Chicago)	
1928-01-09	Unnamed man (alias "Punk")	Illinois (Chicago)	
1927-11-22	Frank Herbert	Illinois (Chicago)	
1927-09-07	Unnamed man	Texas (Breckenridge)	
1927-08-28	Lester Wright (29)	Connecticut (Hartford)	
1927-08-13	Harry Booth (32)	Florida (Miami)	
1927-04-07	Anton "Tony Van Oosbree (24)	Iowa (Sioux City)	
1927-03-30	Joseph Clemente	Illinois (Chicago)	
1927-03-06	Unnamed man (possibly G. Ricca)	California (San Francisco)	
1927-02-12	Unnamed man	Georgia (Atlanta)	
1927-01-05	Oscar Brooks (45)	Alabama (Brantley)	Policemen entered Brooks' house on his farm searching for liquor after he had asked them for a warrant, which they refused. After they obtained a gallon of alcohol, they confronted him on his yard, opening fire upon him. He was unarmed.
1926-10-28	John "Bum" Rogers	New York (Manhattan)	
1926-10-22	Lawrence Bolton (25)	Ohio (Athens)	
1926-10-22	Lloyd Hunder a.k.a. Mike Bartley	Virginia (Staunton)	
1926-10-02	Walter Dunn	Tennessee (Johnson City)	
1926-09-13	James Monroe (26)	Florida (Miami)	
1926-06-16	Eddie "Black Cat" Jones	Texas (Dallas)	
1926-06-09	Lee Hurney	Oklahoma (Picher)	
1926-06-09	Charles Mays	Oklahoma (Picher)	
1926-06-08	Unnamed man	Texas (Brownsville)	
1926-04-30	Louis Burns (20)	Iowa (Cedar Rapids)	
1926-04-30	Floyd Laston (18)	Iowa (Cedar Rapids)	
1926-04-13	Wiley Flowers	Oklahoma (Sapuplpa)	
1926-03-24	Walter Boyd (35)	Indiana (Indianapolis)	
1925-11-16	Minnie Schleissler (21)	New Jersey (Jersey City)	
1925-10-06	C. R. Thompson	New Hampshire (Concord)	
1925-09-25	John Eden (66)	Oklahoma (Broken Bow)	
1925-09-23	Earl Williams	Nebraska (Omaha)	
1925-09-10	Claud Combs	Oklahoma (Altus)	
1925-08-24	Robert Elliott (25)	Tennessee (Spring City)	
1925-08-21	Walter Derosier (20)	Massachusetts (Worcester)	
1925-07-29	Unnamed man	Illinois (Chicago)	
1925-07-29	Unnamed man	Illinois (Chicago)	
1925-04-13	Leo Spence (20)	Illinois (Marion)	
1925-03-09	Unnamed man	New Jersey (Jersey City)	
1924-12-18	Franklin Myler	Nebraska (Omaha)	
1924-11-20	J. H. Sims	Missouri (Kansas City)	
1924-09-16	George Rae (34)	Pennsylvania (West Newton)	Chief George Rae was shot and killed by a man he admonished along with other people at a street party for disturbing the peace.
1924-08-15	Jack Jones	Georgia (Savannah)	
1924-08-04	John Tripioni	Louisiana (New Orleans)	
1924-02-27	Roy McLeroy	Texas (Lufkin)	
1924-02-05	Robert Wood	West Virginia (Charleston)	
1923-10-17	B.B. Rogers (50+)	Texas (Marshall)	Sheriff Rodgers and Constable Proctor shot each other to death in a fight.
1923-10-17	W. B. Procter (50+)	Texas (Marshall)	Sheriff Rodgers and Constable Proctor shot each other to death in a fight.
1923-09-13	Unnamed man	West Virginia (Huntington)	
1923-07-30	John Etter	Oklahoma (Ponca City)	
1923-06-25	Melvine Bayles	California (Los Angeles)	
1923-06-25	Ed Frohn	California (Los Angeles)	
1923-01-21	William Sprague	Texas (El Paso)	
1922-12-06	Unnamed man	California (Oakland)	
1922-11-27	Allen Marrs (31)	California (Los Angeles)	
1922-11-27	C. Willets (25)	California (Los Angeles)	
1922-11-11	Unnamed Black man	Texas (Abilene)	
1922-11-03	Jack Kennedy	Missouri (Wittenburg)	
1922-11-03	Harvey Logan	Missouri (Wittenburg)	
1922-10-23	William McMahon	California (Oakland)	
1922-10-23	Henry Schafffer	California (Oakland)	
1922-10-12	Lou Trider	Missouri (St. Louis)	
1922-09-27	George Price (40)	Arkansas (Eureka Springs)	
1922-09-27	Si Wilson (40)	Arkansas (Eureka Springs)	
1922-09-27	Charles Price (25)	Arkansas (Eureka Springs)	
1922-08-05	John Kalman (40)	Ohio (Newark)	
1922-07-17	Oliver Frazier	Minnesota (St. Paul)	
1922-06-26	Seif [Unknown Last Name]	Georgia (Augusta)	
1922-06-05	Magnum Hicks	Georgia (Atlanta)	
1922-05-13	Unnamed man	Illinois (Chicago)	
1922-05-13	Unnamed man	Illinois (Chicago)	
1922-05-07	Henry Andrews	Louisiana (Shreveport)	
1922-05-05	Bud Ballew	Texas (Wichita Falls)	
1922-04-26	Joe Holiday	Alabama (Anniston)	
1922-04-26	C.B. Hurst	Alabama (Anniston)	
1922-04-22	James Huey	Arkansas (Fort Smith)	
1922-02-21	Juan d'Assumpeau	Rhode Island (Pawtucket)	
1922-01-21	Robert Hooker	Illinois (Chicago)	
1922-01-06	John J. Doyle	Missouri (St. Louis)	
1921-09-30	Unnamed man	California (Visalia)	
1921-09-30	Unnamed man	California (Visalia)	
1921-09-16	Ace Ford (20)	Oklahoma (Ardmore)	
1921-06-09	Thomas Kelly (48)	Ohio (Toledo)	
1921-06-09	John Janeck	Illinois (Chicago)	
1921-02-08	Tom Burns (30)	Utah (Salt Lake City)	
1921-01-28	Eugene Wiley (14)	Oklahoma (Muskogee)	
1921-01-15	G. N. Burkhart	Arkansas (Hot Springs)	
1920-12-15	Unnamed man	Connecticut (South Norwalk)	
1920-05-14	Horace Walton (32)	Illinois (Chicago)	
1920-04-09	Unnamed hispanic man	Texas (Laredo)	
1920-04-09	Unnamed hispanic man	Texas (Laredo)	
1920-04-09	Unnamed hispanic man	Texas (Laredo)	

== See also ==
- Death in custody § United States
- Henry A. Wallace Police Crime Public Database
- List of cases of police brutality
- List of countries with annual rates and counts for killings by law enforcement officers
- List of law enforcement officers killed in the line of duty in the United States
- List of law enforcement officers convicted for an on-duty killing in the United States
- List of shootings by US immigration agents
- List of police reforms related to the George Floyd protests
- List of unarmed African Americans killed by law enforcement officers in the United States
- Lists of killings by law enforcement officers
- Police brutality in the United States
- Police misconduct § United States
- Police riot § United States
- Police use of deadly force in the United States
