= Wesley Person Jr. =

American basketball player

No. 1 – Brussels Basketball
- Position: Shooting guard
- League: BNXT League

Personal information
- Born: August 1, 1995 (age 31) Brantley, Alabama, U.S.
- Listed height: 6 ft 3 in (1.91 m)
- Listed weight: 185 lb (84 kg)

Career information
- High school: Brantley (Brantley, Alabama)
- College: Troy (2014–2018)
- NBA draft: 2018: undrafted
- Playing career: 2018–present

Career history
- 2018–2019: Roseto Sharks
- 2020–2021: Egis Körmend
- 2021–2022: Newcastle Eagles
- 2022–2023: Szedeák
- 2023–2024: Korihait
- 2024: Feniks 2010
- 2024–2025: Korihait
- 2025–2026: BK Opava
- 2026–present: Brussels Basketball

Wesley Person Jr. (born August 1, 1995) is an American professional basketball player for Brussels Basketball of the BNXT League. Person played college basketball for the Troy Trojans.

== Professional career ==
After going undrafted in the 2018 NBA draft, it was reported on July 18, 2018, that Person signed his first professional basketball contract, a one-year deal with the Roseto Sharks of the Serie A2 Basket.

On October 26, 2019, Person was selected by the Maine Red Claws with the 4th pick in the 2nd round of the 2019 NBA G League Draft and was included in the training camp roster. However, he was later waived on November 9, 2019, before the Maine Red Claws finalized the opening night roster.

On February 19, 2020, Egis Körmend announced that they had brought Person to replace Erjon Kastrati.

On September 8, 2021, the Newcastle Eagles announced that they had signed Person to replace Matt Scott, who had suffered a season-ending injury.

For the 2023–24 season, Person signed with Korihait in Finnish Korisliiga.

On July 16, 2026, he signed with Brussels Basketball of the BNXT League for a second stint.

== Personal life ==
Born in Brantley, Alabama, Wesley Person Jr. is the son of former NBA player Wesley Person, and nephew of former NBA player Chuck Person. Wesley Jr.'s cousin, Adrian Person, is a former nationally ranked JUCO basketball player who averaged a national best 31 points per game at Southern Union State Community College in Wadley, Alabama in 1997.
