= Wesley Person =

American basketball player (born 1971)

Personal information
- Born: March 28, 1971 (age 55) Brantley, Alabama, U.S.
- Listed height: 6 ft 6 in (1.98 m)
- Listed weight: 200 lb (91 kg)

Career information
- High school: Brantley (Brantley, Alabama)
- College: Auburn (1990–1994)
- NBA draft: 1994: 1st round, 23rd overall pick
- Drafted by: Phoenix Suns
- Playing career: 1994–2005
- Position: Shooting guard / small forward
- Number: 11, 1, 7, 10

Career history
- 1994–1997: Phoenix Suns
- 1997–2002: Cleveland Cavaliers
- 2002–2003: Memphis Grizzlies
- 2003–2004: Portland Trail Blazers
- 2004: Atlanta Hawks
- 2004–2005: Miami Heat
- 2005: Denver Nuggets

Career highlights
- NBA All-Rookie Second Team (1995); First-team All-SEC (1994); Second-team All-SEC (1993); No. 11 retired by Auburn Tigers

Career NBA statistics
- Points: 8,192 (11.2 ppg)
- Rebounds: 2,402 (3.3 rpg)
- Assists: 1,234 (1.7 apg)
- Stats at NBA.com
- Stats at Basketball Reference
Medals
Men's basketball
Representing United States
FIBA U21 World Championship
Gold medal – first place	1993 Valladolid	National team
FIBA U19 World Championship
Gold medal – first place	1991 Edmonton	National team

Wesley Lavon Person (born March 28, 1971) is an American former professional basketball player who played in the National Basketball Association (NBA). After his playing career, Person became a women's basketball assistant coach and then the head men's basketball coach at Enterprise-Ozark Community College. He was fired from the latter position in 2010.

Selected by the Phoenix Suns 23rd overall in the 1994 NBA draft out of Auburn University, Person played for seven teams throughout his career. He played three seasons for the Suns, five for the Cleveland Cavaliers, 82 games over two seasons for the Memphis Grizzlies, 33 games for the Portland Trail Blazers, nine games for the Atlanta Hawks, sixteen games for the Miami Heat and 25 for the Denver Nuggets. Person retired with career averages of 11.2 points, 3.3 rebounds, and 1.7 assists per game. According to Complex Sports, Person is the 13th greatest three-point shooter of all time.

== NBA career ==
=== Phoenix Suns (1994–1997) ===
On June 29, 1994, the Phoenix Suns drafted Person with the 23rd overall pick in the 1994 NBA draft. Person played his first three seasons in Phoenix, where he averaged 12.2 points per game, 3.4 rebounds per game, and 1.5 assists per game in 240 games. He also had a 45.8% field goal percentage and a 40.7% 3-point percentage. Furthermore, he was named to the NBA All-Rookie Second Team in his rookie season.

=== Cleveland Cavaliers (1997–2002) ===
On October 1, 1997, Person was involved in a three-team trade in which he was traded with Tony Dumas to the Cleveland Cavaliers, where he would spend the majority of his career. Antonio McDyess was traded to the Suns, and three first-round draft picks were traded to the Denver Nuggets. In his first season with Cleveland, he led the NBA in three-pointers made. In five seasons with the franchise, he averaged 12.0 points per game, 3.6 rebounds per game, and 2.0 assists per game. He had a 46.1% field goal percentage and a 42.2 3-point percentage.

=== Memphis Grizzlies (2002–2003) ===
On June 26, 2002, Person was traded to the Memphis Grizzlies for Nick Anderson and Matt Barnes. He would average 11.0 points per game, 2.9 rebounds per game, and 1.7 assists per game in his first season with Memphis. During his second season with the franchise, he averaged 5.2 points per game, 1.1 rebounds per game, and 1.4 assists per game.

=== Portland Trail Blazers (2003–2004) ===
On December 3, 2003, Person was traded, along with a 2004 1st round draft pick (Sergei Monia), to the Portland Trail Blazers for Bonzi Wells. In 33 games for Portland, he would average 6.5 points per game, 2.2 rebounds per game, and 1.2 assists per game.

=== Atlanta Hawks (2004) ===
On February 9, 2004, Person was traded with Rasheed Wallace to the Atlanta Hawks for Shareef Abdur-Rahim, Dan Dickau, and Theo Ratliff. His tenure with Atlanta was the shortest stint of his career, as he played only 9 games for the franchise. He averaged 4.4 points per game, 2.8 rebounds per game, and 0.6 assists per game while he was with the team.

=== Miami Heat (2004–2005) ===
On August 11, 2004, Person signed with the Miami Heat as a free agent. In Miami, he would have the lowest points per game average of his career: 3.9. Person also averaged 1.4 rebounds per game and 0.7 assists per game. On March 1, 2005, he was waived by the team.

=== Denver Nuggets (2005) ===
Two days after being waived, Person signed with the Denver Nuggets. His stint with the Nuggets would be his final NBA tenure. During his 25 games with Denver, he averaged 8.1 points per game, 2.4 rebounds per game, and 1.1 assists per game. Person retired at the end of the season.

== NBA career statistics ==
Legend
GP	Games played	GS	Games started	MPG	Minutes per game
FG%	Field goal percentage	3P%	3-point field goal percentage	FT%	Free throw percentage
RPG	Rebounds per game	APG	Assists per game	SPG	Steals per game
BPG	Blocks per game	PPG	Points per game	**Bold**	Career high
*	Led the league

=== Regular season ===
Year	Team	GP	GS	MPG	FG%	3P%	FT%	RPG	APG	SPG	BPG	PPG
1994–95	Phoenix	78	56	23.1	.484	.436	.792	2.6	1.3	.6	.3	10.4
1995–96	Phoenix	**82**	47	31.8	.445	.374	.771	3.9	1.7	.7	.3	12.7
1996–97	Phoenix	80	42	29.1	.453	.413	.798	3.7	1.5	1.1	.3	13.5
1997–98	Cleveland	**82***	**82***	**39.0**	.460	.430	.776	**4.4**	**2.3**	**1.6**	**.6**	14.7
1998–99	Cleveland	45	42	29.8	.453	.375	.604	3.2	1.8	.8	.4	11.2
1999–00	Cleveland	79	38	26.0	.428	.424	.792	3.4	1.8	.5	.2	9.2
2000–01	Cleveland	44	22	21.8	.438	.405	.800	3.0	1.5	.6	.3	7.1
2001–02	Cleveland	78	78	35.8	**.495**	.444	.798	3.8	2.2	1.0	.5	**15.1**
2002–03	Memphis	66	44	29.4	.456	.433	.814	2.9	1.7	.6	.3	11.0
2003–04	Memphis	16	0	17.8	.308	.256	.750	1.1	1.4	.3	.1	5.2
2003–04	Portland	33	0	18.8	.476	.474	.760	2.2	1.2	.3	.2	6.5
2003–04	Atlanta	9	0	14.7	.333	.421	**1.000**	2.8	.6	.3	.1	4.4
2004–05	Miami	16	3	12.9	.439	.381	**1.000**	1.4	.7	.4	.0	3.9
2004–05	Denver	25	0	18.4	.485	**.485**	.556	2.4	1.1	.5	.2	8.1
Career		733	454	28.3	.457	.418	.778	3.3	1.7	.8	.3	11.2

=== Playoffs ===
Year	Team	GP	GS	MPG	FG%	3P%	FT%	RPG	APG	SPG	BPG	PPG
1995	Phoenix	**10**	**10**	24.7	.410	.378	**.917**	2.1	1.1	.3	.2	9.6
1996	Phoenix	4	4	**45.8**	.393	.310	.800	5.8	.8	**.8**	.3	14.3
1997	Phoenix	5	1	32.6	**.472**	**.424**	.778	**6.6**	1.2	**.8**	**.6**	**15.6**
1998	Cleveland	4	4	34.0	.379	.368	.750	2.3	**2.5**	.8	.0	8.0
2005	Denver	4	0	13.5	.429	.375	.000	.3	.3	.3	.0	3.8
Career		27	19	29.0	.417	.373	.821	3.2	1.1	.5	.2	10.3

== Personal life ==
Born in Brantley, Alabama, Person is the younger brother of former NBA player Chuck Person, and his son Wesley Jr. played college basketball at Troy University and was selected by the Maine Red Claws in the 2019 NBA G League draft. Wesley's nephew, Adrian Person, is a former nationally ranked JUCO basketball player who averaged a national best 31 points per game at Southern Union State Community College in Wadley, Alabama in 1997.

== See also ==
- List of National Basketball Association career 3-point field goal percentage leaders
