= Statue of Jefferson Davis (Montgomery, Alabama) =

Statue in Montgomery, Alabama

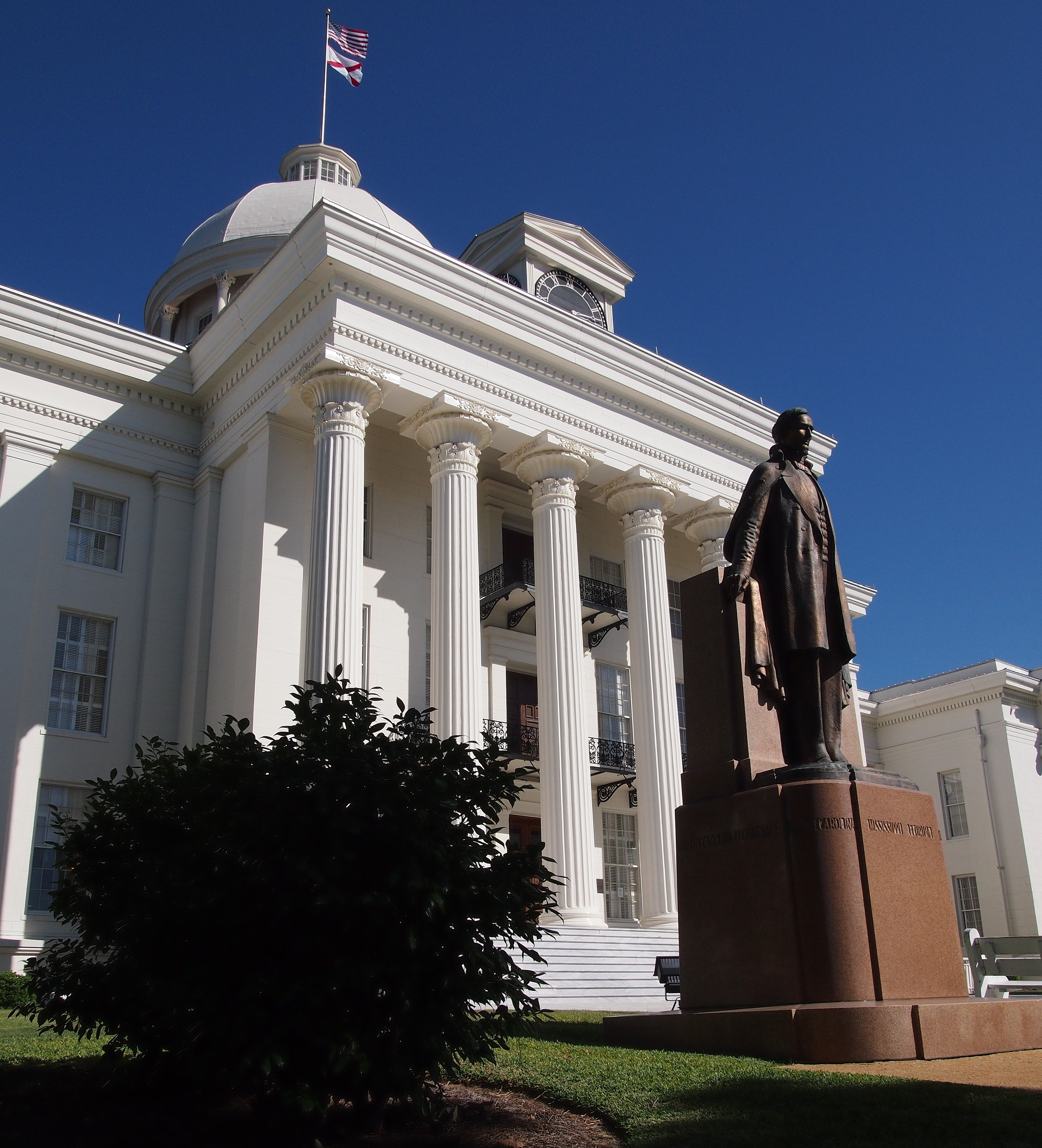
- The statue in 2011
- Artist: Frederick Cleveland Hibbard
- Year: 1940
- Medium: Bronze sculpture
- Subject: Jefferson Davis
- Location: Montgomery, Alabama, United States; 32.377852°N 86.300879°W

A bronze sculpture of Jefferson Davis by Frederick Cleveland Hibbard is installed outside the Alabama State Capitol in Montgomery, Alabama, United States.

== Description and history ==
The statue was dedicated on November 19, 1940. It measures approximately 9 ft. 6 in. x 4 ft. 2 in. x 2 ft., and rests on a base that granite measures approximately 10 ft. 1 in. x 7 ft. 9 1/2 in. x 6 ft. 8 in. The artwork was surveyed by the Smithsonian Institution's "Save Outdoor Sculpture!" program in 1993.

== See also ==
- 1940 in art
- Confederate Memorial Monument
- List of Confederate monuments and memorials
- List of memorials to Jefferson Davis
