= Confederate Soldier Memorial (Huntsville, Alabama) =

Monument to the Confederate Army in Huntsville, Alabama

- Confederate Monument
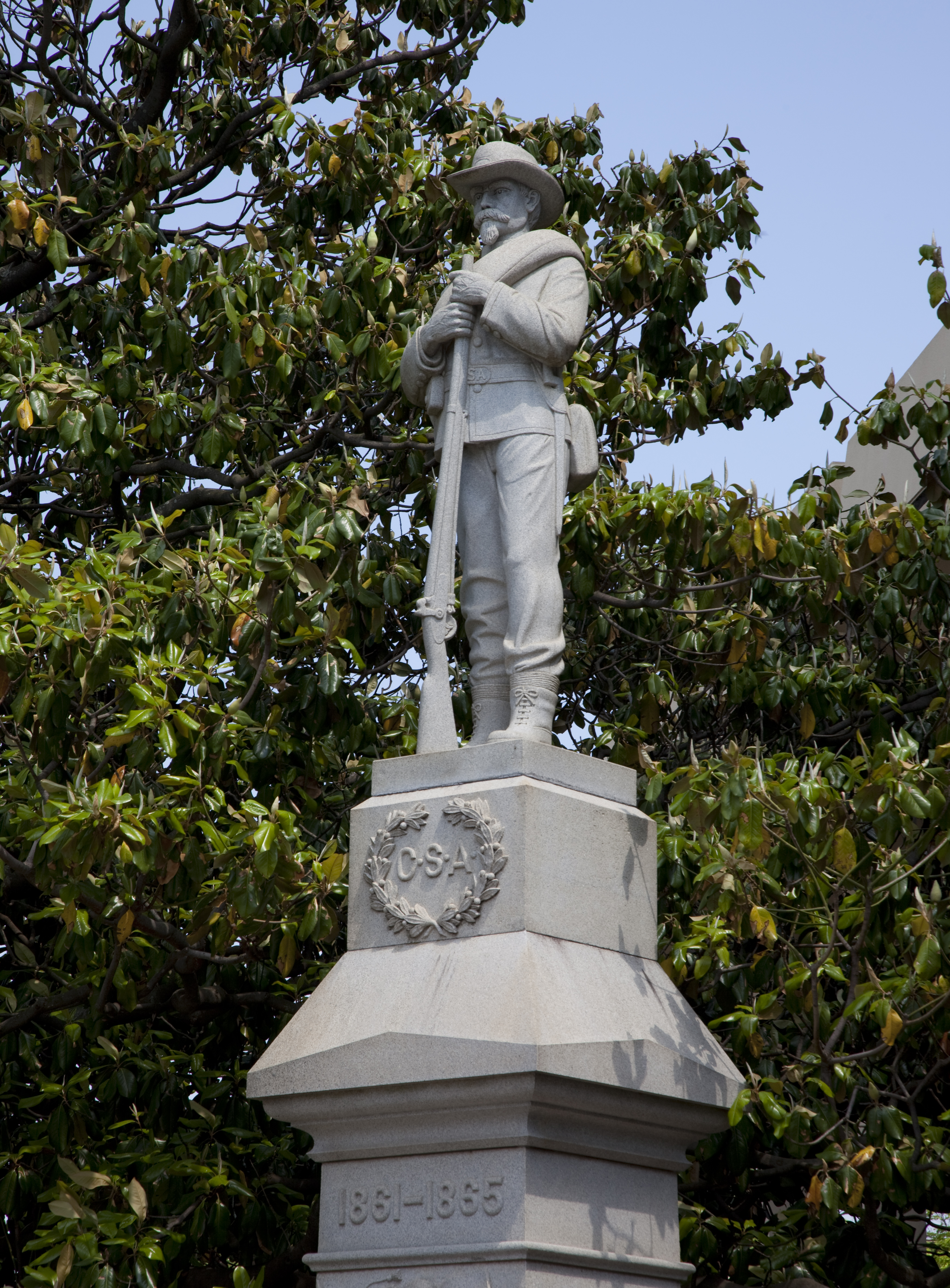
- The memorial in 2010
- Year: 1905
- Location: Huntsville, Alabama, U.S.
- 34.73102°N 86.57129°W

The Confederate Soldier Memorial, or Confederate Monument, is located in the Maple Hill Cemetery in Huntsville, Alabama.

== Description ==
The monument consists of a life-sized granite statue of a Confederate soldier holding a rifle. The base underneath the statue is engraved with text praising what it describes as the "noble cause" of the Confederacy and commemorating those who lost their lives fighting for it, including Huntsville local General John Hunt Morgan.

== History ==
The memorial was erected in 1905 by the Daughters of the Confederacy near the Madison County Courthouse.

In 1966, the courthouse next the Confederate Soldier Memorial was demolished to make room for a new courthouse. The memorial was moved across the street and laid on its side near a row of pre-Civil War structures that were also being demolished. The Confederate soldier statue was accidentally crushed by a falling wall; the base was unharmed. The Daughters of the Confederacy successfully sued the demolition company and used their winning to construct a new statue on the surviving base. In 1968, the partially reconstructed statue was re-dedicated back in its original position.

In early June 2020, the monument was protested against in the aftermath of the May 2020 murder of George Floyd. On June 10, 2020, the seven person Madison County Commission voted unanimously to seek approval from a state committee to move the monument to the Maple Hill Cemetery, but the Alabama Monument Preservation Committee responded that approving such a move would be outside of their authority. Under the 2017 Alabama Memorial Preservation Act, the county must seek permission to remove historical markers that have been in place for twenty to forty years; it contains no process for the removal of markers that have been in place for over forty years such as the Confederate Soldier Memorial. If the memorial is removed without state permission, the county would be fined $25,000.

On the night of October 22, 2020 or the early morning of October 23, 2020, the city removed the monument from the Courthouse Square. It was relocated to nearby Maple Hill Cemetery in a section containing graves of Confederate soldiers.

== See also ==
- List of Confederate monuments and memorials in Alabama
- List of monuments and memorials removed during the George Floyd protests
