= Lavinia Stoddard =

American poet, school founder

- Born: June 29, 1787; Guilford, Connecticut, U.S.
- Died: November 8, 1820 (aged 33)
- Occupations: poet, school founder
- Spouse: William Stoddard (m. 1811, died)
- Writing career
- Language: English
- Notable work: "The Soul's Defiance"

Lavinia Stoddard (née Stone; June 29, 1787 – November 8, 1820) was an American poet and school founder from Connecticut. She spent her early years in New Jersey, where she received her education. After marrying physician William Stoddard, she co-founded and ran an academy in Troy, New York, which became known for its educational work in the community. Stoddard wrote numerous poems that were published anonymously in periodicals, including "The Soul’s Defiance", which reflected her personal experiences and was widely reprinted in nineteenth-century American anthologies. She spent her final years in Alabama due to ill health and died there in 1820.

== Early life and education ==
Lavinia Stone was born in Guilford, Connecticut, June 29, 1787. Her father was Elijah Stone. While she was an infant, the family removed to Paterson, New Jersey.

In Paterson, she received the kind of education in the schools as was at the time common to the children of farmers.

== Career ==
In 1811, she married Dr. William Stoddard, of Stratford, Connecticut. He was a graduate of Yale University in 1804; a graduate of the Medical School of the University of Pennsylvania in 1810, and a member of the Rensselaer County Medical Society in 1817.

In the then flourishing village of Troy, New York, on the Hudson River, the husband and wife established an academy, which they conducted for several years. Here, they were friends of Francis Wayland, D.D., LL.D., afterwards of Brown University, and were both noticed in his memoir in a complimentary way.

Stoddard wrote many poems, which were printed anonymously in the public journals. Her brother stated that the poem entitled "The Soul's Defiance" was interesting to her immediate friends for the truthfulness with which it portrayed her own experience. This was written in a period of suffering and with a sense of injury. It was the last of her compositions, and perhaps the best. It was included in most of the anthologies published in the United States in the 19th century.

== Personal life ==
Stoddard became ill with consumption, and about the year 1818, she removed with her family to Blakeley, Alabama, where Dr. Stoddard soon after died. Partially recovering her own health, she revisited Troy, but the severity of the climate induced her to return to Blakeley, where she died within a year of her husband. She died November 8, 1820, and was buried at the Blakeley Cemetery.

== "The Soul's Defiance" ==
I SAID to Sorrow’s awful storm,
That beat against my breast,
Rage on—thou may’st destroy this form,
And lay it low at rest;
But still the spirit that now brooks
Thy tempest, raging high,
Undaunted on its fury looks
With steadfast eye.

I said to Penury’s meagre train,
Come on—your threats I brave;
My last poor life-drop you may drain,
And crush me to the grave;
Yet still the spirit that endures
Shall mock your force the while,
And meet each cold, cold grasp of yours
With bitter smile.

I said to cold Neglect and Scorn,
Pass on—I heed you not;
Ye may pursue me till my form
And being are forgot;
Yet still the spirit, which you see
Undaunted by your wiles,
Draws from its own nobility
Its high-born smiles.

I said to Friendship’s menaced blow,
Strike deep—my heart shall bear;
Thou canst but add one bitter woe
To those already there;
Yet still the spirit that sustains
This last severe distress
Shall smile upon its keenest pains,
And scorn redress.

I said to Death’s uplifted dart,
Aim sure—oh, why delay?
Thou wilt not find a fearful heart—
A weak, reluctant prey;
For still the spirit, firm and free,
Unruffled by this last dismay,
Wrapt in its own eternity,
Shall pass away.
