= Confederate Memorial Monument =

Monument in then U.S. state of Alabama

- United States
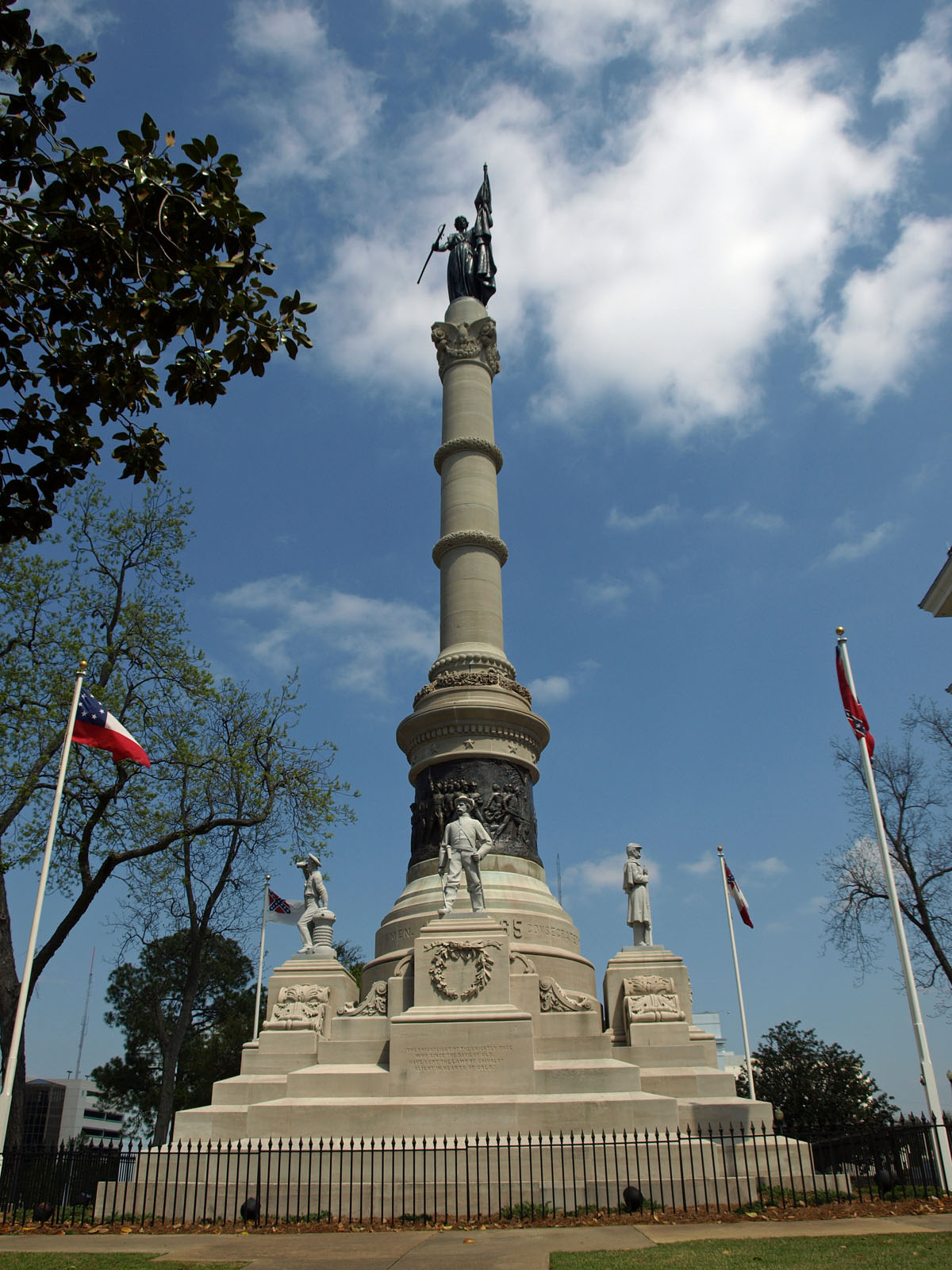
- The Confederate Memorial Monument in 2009. The four Confederate flags were removed in the wake of the Charleston shooting in 2015.
- For Alabama's more than 122,000 Confederate veterans of the Civil War
- Established: December 7, 1898
- Location: 32.3784°N 86.3006°W; Alabama State Capitol
- Designed by: Gorda C. Doud

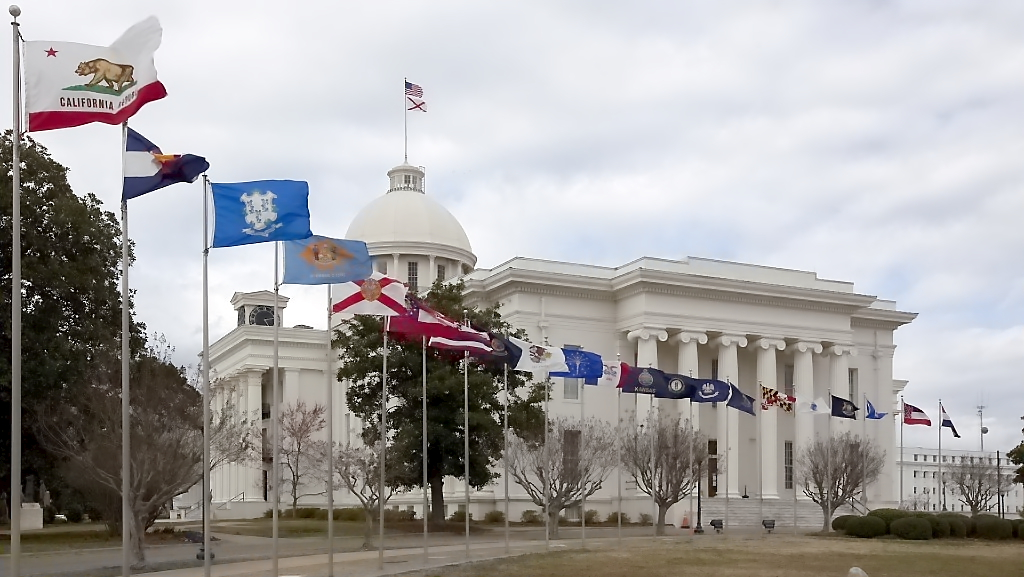
View of the west (front) and south facades with the Avenue of Flags in the foreground.

The Confederate Memorial Monument is a monument installed outside the Alabama State Capitol.

== Description and history ==
On the north side of Capitol Hill there is a monument dedicated to Alabama's more than 122,000 Confederate veterans of the Civil War, known as the Confederate Memorial Monument. The 88-foot (27 m) tall monument was dedicated on December 7, 1898, although it had been planned as early as November 1865. Funding for the monument included $20,000 in the form of two grants from the state legislature, $10,000 contributed by the Ladies Memorial Association of Alabama, $6,755 from the Historical and Monumental Association of Alabama that was formed in 1865 to support the erection of this monument, and $5,000 from politicians.

Design of the monument was done by Gorda C. Doud and executed by sculptor Alexander Doyle of New York City. The design features a stepped base surmounted by statuary representing the four branches of the military. Centered on top of this is a monumental bronze and limestone column, topped with a bronze figure by Doyle representing "Patriotism." The cornerstone was laid by Jefferson Davis on April 29, 1886.

The base was built with Alabama limestone from Russellville, but problems occurred with the limestone for the column being found to be faulty. Although records are not complete, recent analysis has indicated that the column was eventually built using stone from Bedford, Indiana. Relations between Doyle and his monument clients had soured by the late 1880s. The remaining granite figures for the base, representing the military branches, were contracted from Barnicoat Monuments in Quincy, Massachusetts.

Critics have repeatedly called for the monument's removal, stating that it promotes white supremacy. These removal attempts have met with considerable resistance from preservationists and others. The monument was vandalized in 2007, with black paint sprayed on the granite and limestone.

On the morning of June 24, 2015, the flagpoles containing the Flags of the Confederate States of America, along with the Confederate Battle Flag, were removed on the orders of Governor Robert J. Bentley. This act was done in the wake of the Charleston church shooting of June 17, 2015, after which many states responded to calls to prohibit Confederate flags from being displayed on public property. Bentley stated he found no laws or policies requiring the flags to stay up, and wanted to prevent any distractions from state legislative work.

== See also ==
- List of Confederate monuments and memorials in Alabama
