= Blakeley, Alabama =

- Blakeley
- U.S. National Register of Historic Places
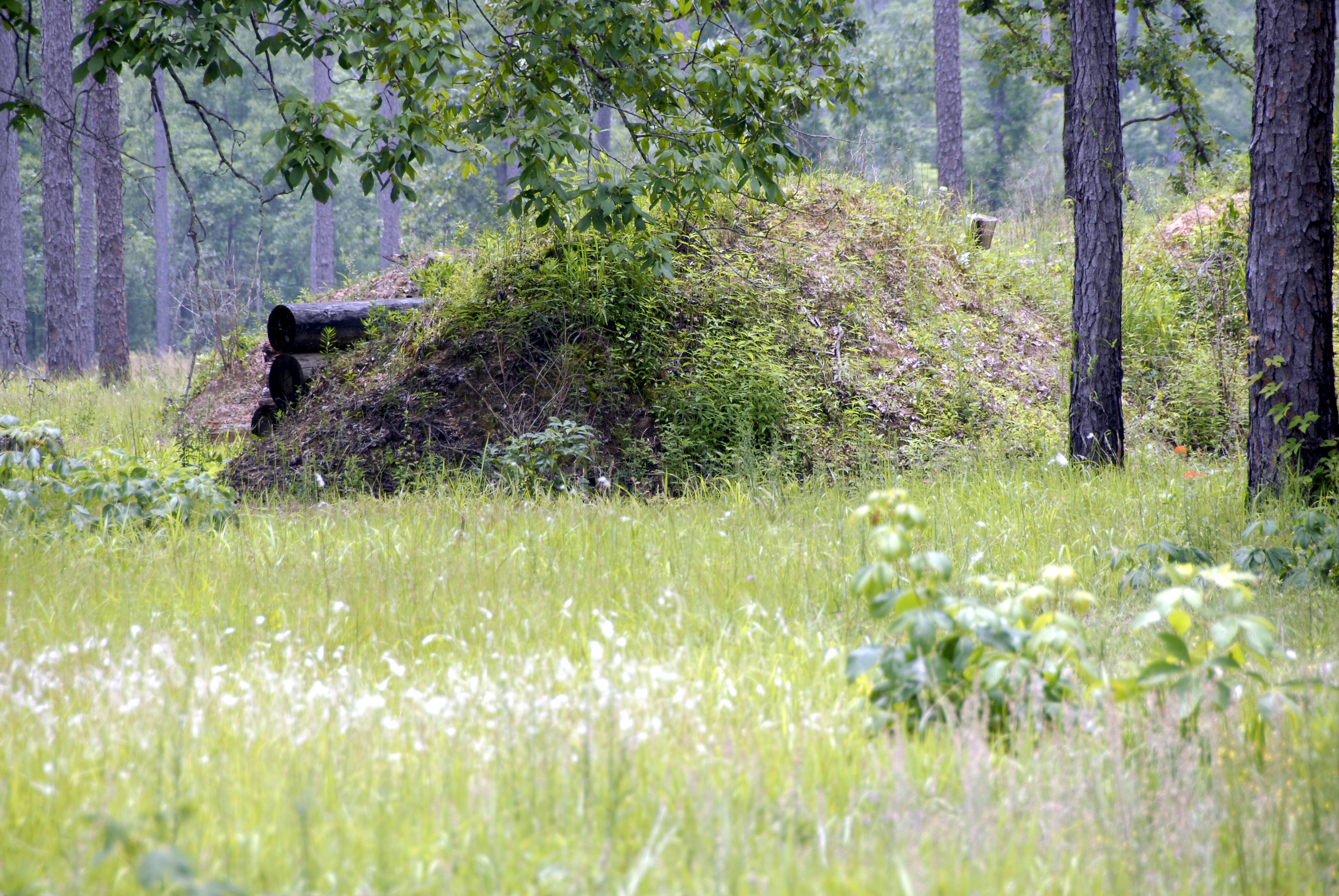
- The Boyaux fortification at the Blakeley battleground

- Location within Alabama Location within the United States
- Location: Baldwin County, Alabama, along the Tensaw River north of Spanish Fort
- Nearest city: Spanish Fort
- Coordinates: 30°44′32″N 87°55′27″W
- Built: 1813
- NRHP reference No.: 74000397
- Added to NRHP: June 25, 1974

Blakeley is a ghost town in Baldwin County, Alabama, United States. During the height of its existence, Blakeley was a thriving town which flourished as a competitor to its western neighbor, Mobile. Blakeley was the county seat for Baldwin County from 1820 until 1868, when the county government was moved south to Daphne. Blakeley was the location of a major fort during the Civil War. One of the last battles of the Civil War was fought here in April 1865, as Union soldiers overran Confederates. The town is now in an Alabama historic state park known as Historic Blakeley State Park, north of Spanish Fort.

Before the town was established and populated by European settlers, Native Americans had lived in the area. A burial mound was found near the site of the town and was excavated. Four skulls, various bones and copper ornaments were found. Blakeley was located along the Mobile Tensaw delta where the Mississippian culture flourished around AD 1250-1500 at the Bottle Creek site.

In the 1700s while the Mobile Bay region was claimed by the French, an allied native group from Florida called the Apalachees established a village here. Later British and Spanish colonial era settlers farmed the area before it came under American control in 1813.

In 1813, Blakeley was founded by Josiah Blakeley, "an entrepreneur and adventurer from Connecticut" who moved to Mobile in 1806. He purchased 7,000 acres (2,800 ha) of land in the northeastern portion of Mobile Bay. In 1813 he hired a surveyor to lay out the town of Blakeley and sold the first 10 lots. On January 6, 1814, the Mississippi Territorial Legislature authorized Josiah Blakeley to lay out a town to be known as Blakeley. It received official incorporation from the State of Alabama in 1820.

After the War of 1812, Jacob Bell and David Brown became successful shipbuilders in Blakeley. They left for New York City in 1820 to found Brown & Bell, a shipyard famous for its clipper ships and steamships.

Blakeley had a "deep natural port, which was reachable by ships that could not cross the Dog River bar, a sandbar that sometimes impeded shipping access to Mobile." For some years, Blakeley competed with Mobile to be the top port in what was then the Alabama Territory.

A post office operated under the name "Blakeley" from 1826 to 1866.

In 1974, the ghost town was listed on the National Register of Historic Places.

== Notable person ==
- Lavinia Stoddard (1787–1820), poet, school founder
