= Unknown Alabama Confederate Soldiers Monument =

Coordinates: 31.623359°N 86.264580°W

- Interactive map of Unknown Alabama Confederate Soldiers Monument
- Location: Brantley, Alabama, United States
- Completion date: 2017

The Unknown Alabama Confederate Soldiers Monument is an outdoor stone marker and memorial installed three miles (4.8 km) north of Brantley, Alabama, in a privately owned Confederate Veterans Memorial Park.

== History ==
In 2017, the owner of the private Confederate Veterans Memorial Park in Crenshaw County, Alabama, announced the erection of the Unknown Alabama Confederate Soldiers Monument as a memorial to Confederate States of America soldiers whom had died in battle during the American Civil War but their bodies had never been recovered. At the unveiling ceremony, security and fences were erected around the site. The Sons of Confederate Veterans and United Daughters of the Confederacy attended, with many wearing historical uniforms and flying the Confederate flag. When the monument was unveiled, a cannons salute was fired. The construction of the monument came at a time when many other Confederate monuments were being removed from public display.

The date of the unveiling was controversial as it was announced shortly after a riot in Charlottesville, Virginia around the removal of a statue of Robert E. Lee. The organisers stated there was no coincidence as the monument had been planned nine months in advance and that the timing was only because it was made public two days after the riot. Plans were also made for a similar memorial to commemorate lost sailors of the Confederate States Navy.

== Design ==
The monument reads:

Unknown AL Soldier
C.S.A.
"Mother, I have
been found.
I am home."

It sits among existing monuments, replica cannons and tall flagpoles flying Confederate and other flags. More than 500 people attended the monument's dedication in 2017. Another source gives the number as 200.

== See also ==
- List of Confederate monuments and memorials
