= Confederate Monument (Troy, Alabama) =

- United States
- Used for those deceased
- Established: 1908
- Location: 31.8076°N 85.9718°W near Troy, Alabama

The Confederate Monument, also known as the "Comrades" Confederate Monument, is a Confederate memorial in Troy, Alabama, in the United States. The monument was installed in 1908 by the Pike Monumental Association, United Confederate Veterans, and the United Daughters of the Confederacy of Pike County, Alabama.

== See also ==
- Confederate Monument (Camden, Alabama)
- Confederate Monument (Fort Payne, Alabama)
- Confederate Monument (Ozark, Alabama)
- List of Confederate monuments and memorials
