= Confederate Monument (Camden, Alabama) =

- United States
- Used for those deceased
- Established: 1880
- Location: 31.99513°N 87.2936°W near Camden, Alabama

The Confederate Monument, also known as the Confederate Dead of Wilcox County, is an outdoor memorial in Camden, Alabama, in the United States. The monument was installed in 1880 by the Ladies Memorial and Wilcox Monumental Associations.

== See also ==
- Confederate Monument (Fort Payne, Alabama)
- Confederate Monument (Ozark, Alabama)
- Confederate Monument (Troy, Alabama)
- List of Confederate monuments and memorials
