= Confederate Monument (Fort Payne, Alabama) =

- United States
- Used for those deceased
- Established: 1913
- Location: 34.4440°N 85.7195°W near Fort Payne, Alabama

The Confederate Monument is a Confederate memorial in Fort Payne, Alabama, in the United States. The monument was installed in 1913, "erected through the efforts of the Sons and Daughters of the Confederacy, with the assistance of other interested citizens. The monument was originally located in the center of town and was moved to its present location at a later time.

== See also ==
- Confederate Monument (Camden, Alabama)
- Confederate Monument (Ozark, Alabama)
- Confederate Monument (Troy, Alabama)
- List of Confederate monuments and memorials
