= Confederate Monument (Ozark, Alabama) =

- United States
- Used for those deceased
- Established: 1910
- Location: 31.4584°N 85.6404°W near Ozark, Alabama

The Confederate Monument, also known as the Dale County Confederate Soldiers Monument, is a Confederate memorial in Ozark, Alabama, in the United States. The monument was installed in 1910 by the Stonewall Jackson Chapter, United Daughters of the Confederacy No. 667 of Dale County, Alabama.

== See also ==
- 1910 in art
- Confederate Monument (Camden, Alabama)
- Confederate Monument (Fort Payne, Alabama)
- Confederate Monument (Troy, Alabama)
- List of Confederate monuments and memorials
