= Historic Blakeley State Park =

State park in Baldwin County, Alabama, United States

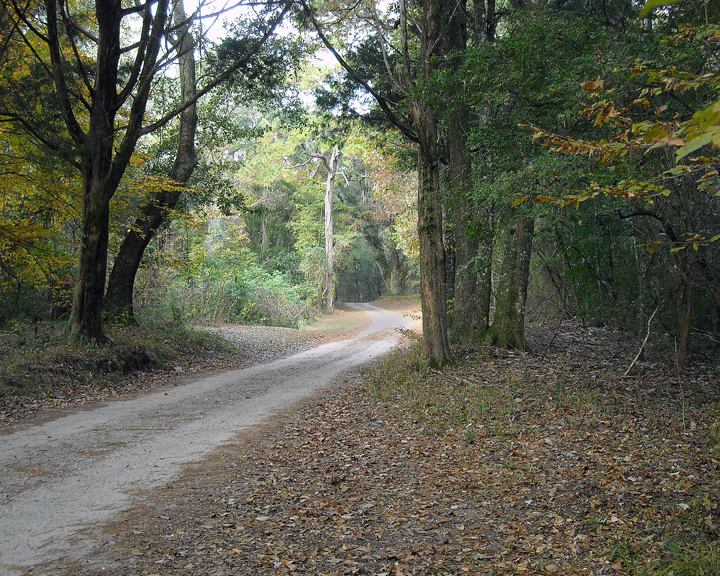
- A quiet road through the park

- Location within Alabama
- Location: Baldwin County, Alabama, United States
- Coordinates: 30°44′31″N 87°55′26″W
- Area: 2,000 acres (810 ha)
- Elevation: 46 ft (14 m)
- Established: 1976
- Administrator: Historic Blakeley
- Website: Official website

Historic Blakeley State Park is located on the site of the former town of Blakeley in Baldwin County, Alabama on the Tensaw River delta. The park encompasses an area once occupied by settlers in what was a thriving community on the river. Later, Confederate soldiers were garrisoned here and fought against Union forces in the last major battle of the U.S. Civil War.

== History ==
The park was founded by school teacher Mary Grice of Mobile, Alabama. In 1976, the park was established as a private not-for-profit foundation. The goal was to preserve and redevelop the area. In 1981, the Alabama Legislature named Blakeley a state park and created a separate state authority to oversee operations. Although it is called a state park, it is not operated by the Alabama Department of Conservation and Natural Resources. State funding was suspended during 2011, and the park is now fully funded by private contributions and gate receipts.

In 1993, Blakeley was named a Class A Civil War site by the United States Congress. The park is part of the Civil War Discovery Trail due to it being the site of the Battle of Fort Blakeley. Some remnants of battlefield operations remain including the Confederate breastworks that cross the park. Some effort is underway to restore the Confederate and Union constructs that supported the Battle of Fort Blakeley. That battle, involving over 16,000 soldiers, occurred on the same day as the Confederate surrender. African-American troops made up a significant number of the Union forces.

Little evidence remains today of the previous town of Blakeley. A few historical markers designate important locations such as a brick kiln and an old oak tree used as a hanging tree for the local courts. A river crossing here once linked Mobile and Baldwin counties. Prior to the establishment of the town of Blakeley, an ancient Native American village existed and, later, a large plantation occupied this location.

== Location and activities ==
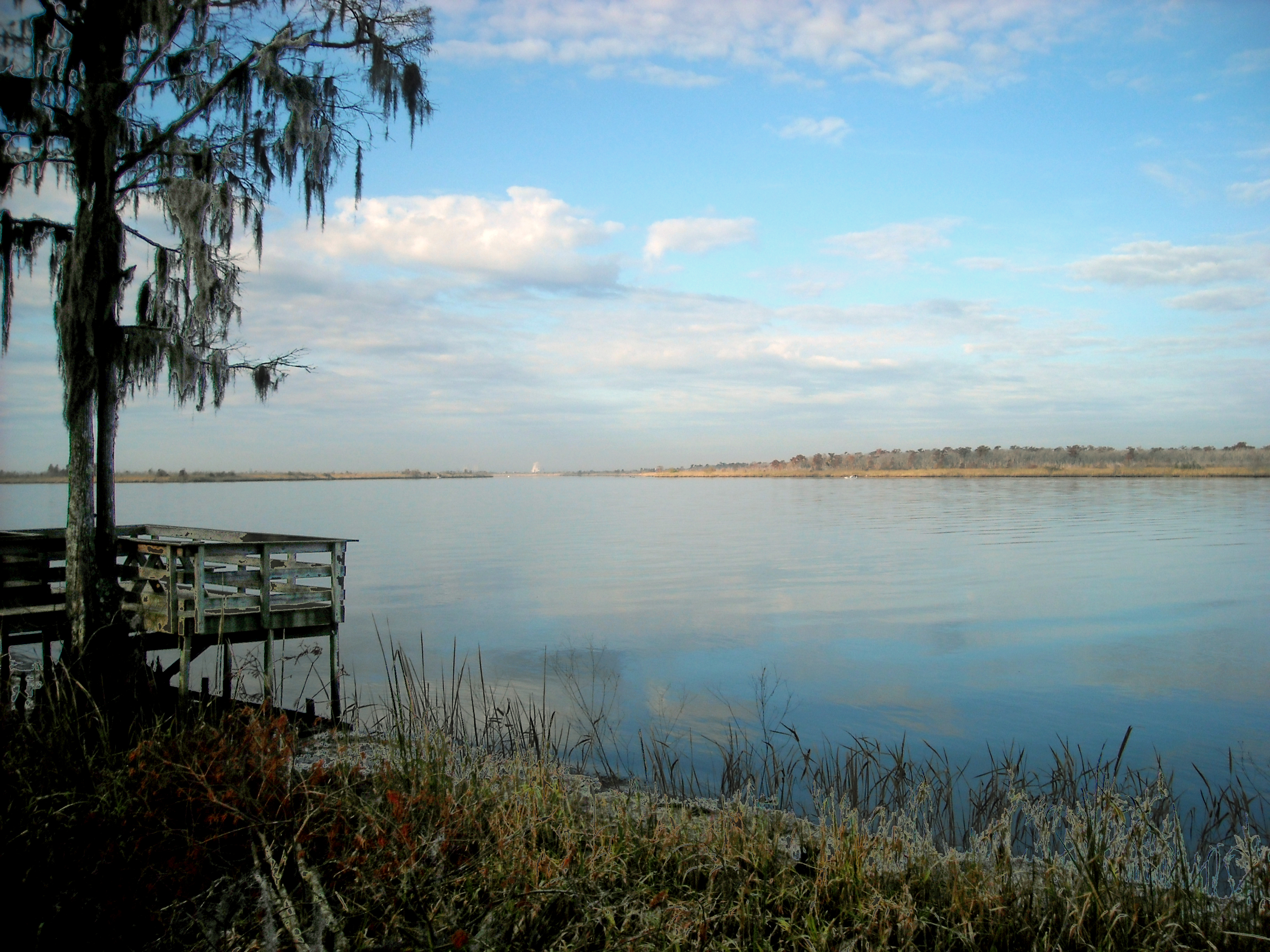
Tensaw River at Blakeley

The 2,000-acre (810 ha) park is located on Alabama 225 4.5 miles (7.2 km) north of the town of Spanish Fort, Alabama. The park is bounded on the east by the highway and by the river to the west. Mobile, Alabama can be seen in the distance across the river. Camping, both primitive and RV, is available year-round. Group campsites are also available. Numerous picnic areas and 20 miles (32 km) of hiking trails are found within the park. The park charges a fee for admission and for camping. A motorized launch takes guests on a tour of the delta region during warmer months. Special events are held at the Gatra Wehle Center.
