= Limestone County Confederate Soldiers Memorial =

Coordinates: 34.8031°N 86.9713°W

- Location: Limestone County Courthouse, Athens, Alabama
- Beginning date: 1909
- Dedicated to: Confederate soldiers

The Limestone County Confederate Soldiers Memorial is an outdoor marble Confederate memorial installed outside the Limestone County Courthouse in Athens, Alabama, in the United States. It was erected in 1909, and depicts a soldier standing at rest with the stock of his musket resting on the base.

The base of the statue includes a carved flag and the following inscription:

(on side of base) "IN MEMORY OF LIMESTONE'S SONS THIS MONUMENT IS ERECTED BY THEIR SURVIVORS AND JOSEPH E. JOHNSON CHAPTER U.D.C. 1909 (On opposite side of base:) ENOBLED BY TRIUMPH EXALTED BY DEFEAT THOMAS H. HOBBS CAMP NO 400 U.C.V. (On back of base:) THE KNIGHTLIEST OF THE KNIGHTLY RACE WHO, SINCE THE DAYS OF OLD HAVE KEPT THE LAMPS OF CHIVALRY ALIGHT IN THE HEARTS OF GOLD" from the poem, The Virginians of the Valley, by Francis Orray Ticknor.

== See also ==
- 1909 in art
- List of Confederate monuments and memorials
