= Demopolis Town Square =

Historic park in Alabama, United States

- Confederate Park
- U.S. National Register of Historic Places
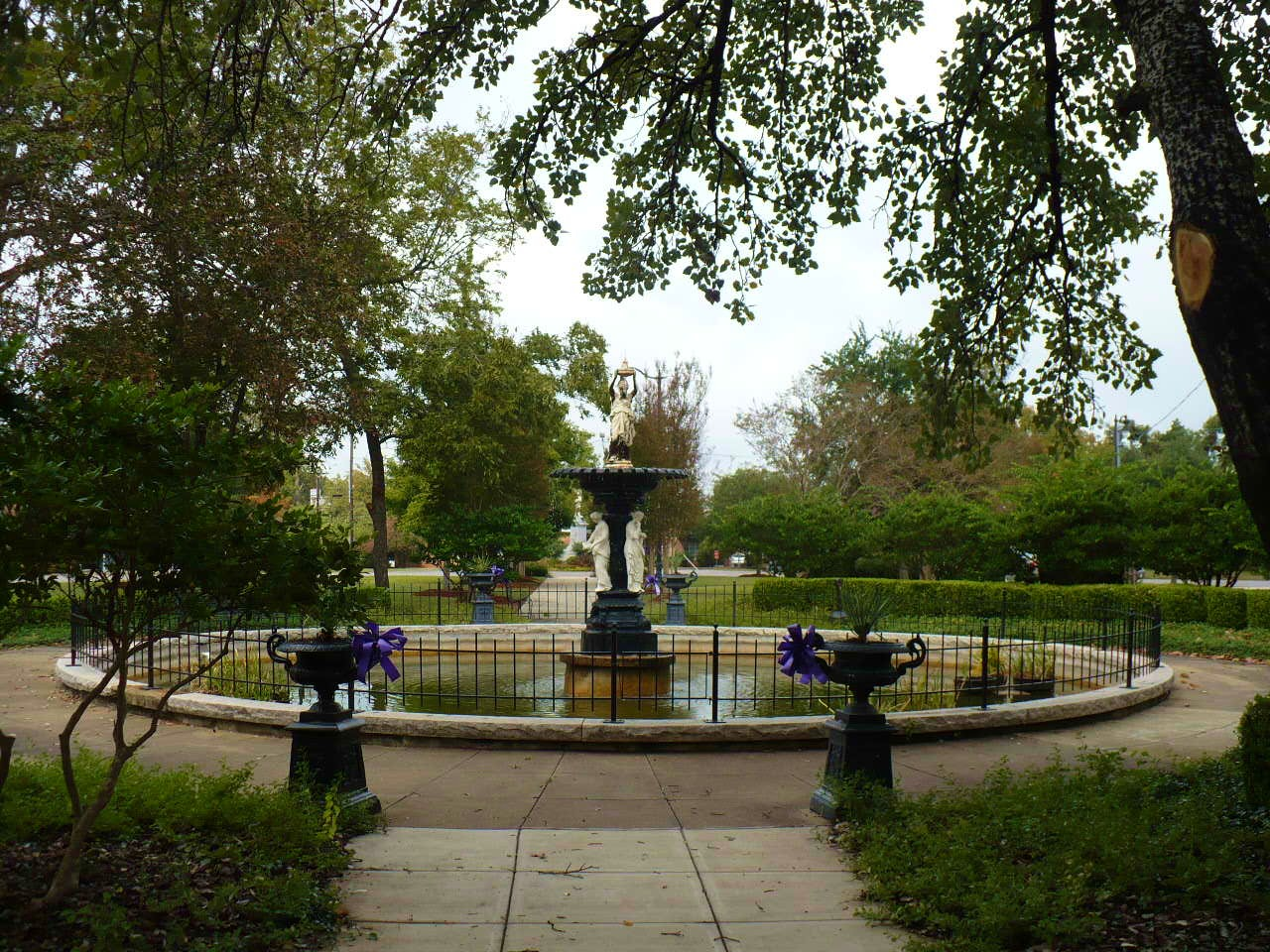
- The fountain in the center of the park in 2010.

- Location within Alabama Location within the United States
- Location: Demopolis, Alabama
- Coordinates: 32°31′4.32″N 87°50′17.49″W
- Area: 4 acres (1.6 ha)
- Built: 1819
- Architectural style: Greek Revival, Victorian
- NRHP reference No.: 75000319
- Added to NRHP: October 29, 1975

Demopolis Town Square, currently officially known as Confederate Park, is a historic park in the city of Demopolis, Alabama, United States. It is one of the oldest public squares in the state. Demopolis had its beginnings in 1817 with the Vine and Olive Colony, and the park was established in 1819. The park covers one city block, bounded by Main, Capitol, Walnut, and Washington Streets.

The park was renamed "Confederate Park" in 1923, at request of United Daughters of the Confederacy.

The park contains several historic structures, including a Victorian-era gazebo near the corner of Walnut Avenue and Washington Street, the Demopolis City Hall, built in 1869–70 as a courthouse annex, and the old Presbyterian Church, built in 1843 and now known as Rooster Hall. The former church served as the Marengo County Courthouse from 1868 until 1871, when the county seat was temporarily moved from Linden. The park's center features a large cast iron fountain that was installed in 1895. The park is often used for the city's festivals, most notably for many of the Christmas on the River events. The park was added to the National Register of Historic Places on 29 November 1975.
