= Brantley, Alabama =

- Town
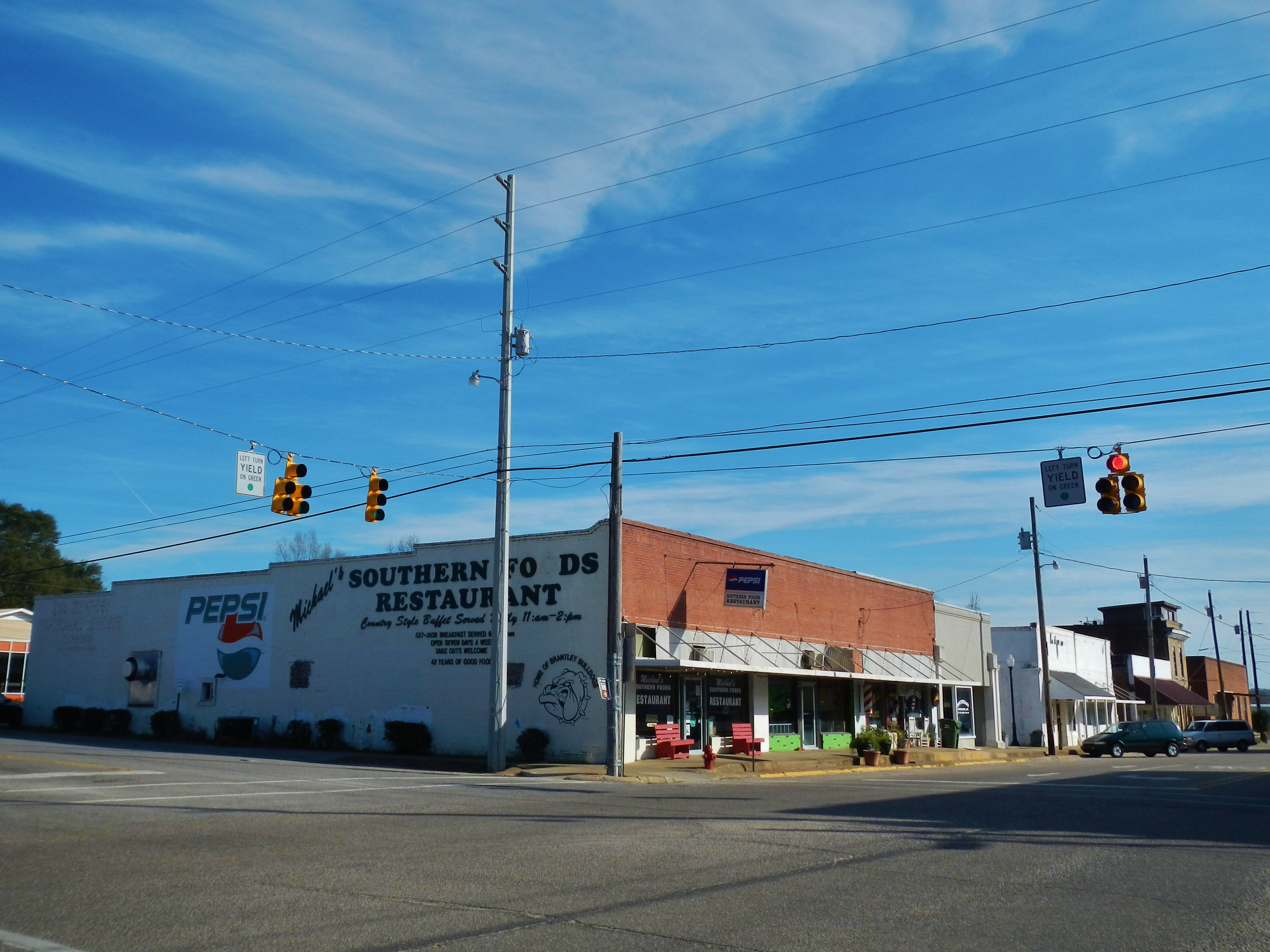
- Brantley in 2012

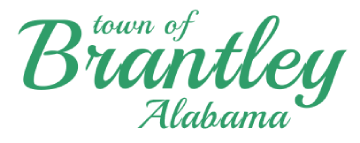
- Logo
- Nickname: "Front Porch Capital of the South"
- Location of Brantley in Crenshaw County, Alabama.
- Coordinates: 31°35′3″N 86°15′23″W
- Country: United States
- State: Alabama
- County: Crenshaw

Area
  - Total: 3.16 sq mi (8.18 km^{2})
  - Land: 3.11 sq mi (8.05 km^{2})
  - Water: 0.050 sq mi (0.13 km^{2})
- Elevation: 300 ft (90 m)

Population (2020)
  - Total: 825
  - Density: 265.5/sq mi (102.52/km^{2})
- Time zone: UTC-6 (Central (CST))
  - Summer (DST): UTC-5 (CDT)
- ZIP code: 36009
- Area code: 334
- FIPS code: 01-09016
- GNIS feature ID: 0154995
- Website: https://www.townofbrantley.org/

Brantley is a city in Crenshaw County, Alabama, United States. At the 2020 census, the population was 825. Brantley was incorporated in 1891 as a city.

== Geography ==
Brantley is located in southern Crenshaw County at 31°35'4" North, 86°15'24" West (31.584365, −86.256651).

According to the U.S. Census Bureau, the town has a total area of 3.16 square miles (8.18 km^{2}), of which 3.11 square miles (8.05 km^{2}) is land and 0.050 square miles (0.13 km^{2}), or 1.60%, is water. The town is located on high ground north of the Conecuh River.

== Demographics ==
Historical population
Census	Pop.	Note	%±
1900	390		—
1910	803		105.9%
1920	702		−12.6%
1930	1,053		50.0%
1940	1,126		6.9%
1950	1,102		−2.1%
1960	1,014		−8.0%
1970	1,066		5.1%
1980	1,151		8.0%
1990	1,015		−11.8%
2000	920		−9.4%
2010	809		−12.1%
2020	825		2.0%
U.S. Decennial Census; 2013 Estimate

=== Racial and ethnic composition ===
Brantley city, Alabama – Racial and ethnic composition Note: the US Census treats Hispanic/Latino as an ethnic category. This table excludes Latinos from the racial categories and assigns them to a separate category. Hispanics/Latinos may be of any race. Race and ethnicity were not surveyed for populations under 2,500 in 1980 and under 1,000 in 1990.
Race / Ethnicity (NH = Non-Hispanic)	Pop 1990	Pop 2000	Pop 2010	Pop 2020	% 1990	% 2000	% 2010	% 2020
White alone (NH)	624	546	450	449	61.48%	59.35%	55.62%	54.42%
Black or African American alone (NH)	387	369	311	340	38.13%	40.11%	38.44%	41.21%
Native American or Alaska Native alone (NH)	3	4	5	4	0.30%	0.43%	0.62%	0.48%
Asian alone (NH)	1	0	4	1	0.10%	0.00%	0.49%	0.12%
Native Hawaiian or Pacific Islander alone (NH)	x	0	0	0	x	0.00%	0.00%	0.00%
Other race alone (NH)	0	0	0	1	0.00%	0.00%	0.00%	0.12%
Mixed race or Multiracial (NH)	x	0	23	16	x	0.00%	2.84%	1.94%
Hispanic or Latino (any race)	0	1	16	14	0.00%	0.11%	1.98%	1.70%
Total	1,015	920	809	825	100.00%	100.00%	100.00%	100.00%

=== 2000 census ===
As of the census of 2000, there were 920 people, 406 households, and 261 families residing in the town. The population density was 291.1 inhabitants per square mile (112.4/km^{2}). There were 467 housing units at an average density of 147.8 per square mile (57.1/km^{2}). The racial makeup of the town was 59.35% White, 40.22% Black or African American and 0.43% Native American. 0.11% of the population were Hispanic or Latino of any race.

There were 406 households, out of which 28.8% had children under the age of 18 living with them, 38.2% were married couples living together, 23.2% had a female householder with no husband present, and 35.5% were non-families. 34.5% of all households were made up of individuals, and 19.7% had someone living alone who was 65 years of age or older. The average household size was 2.27 and the average family size was 2.90.

In the town, the population was spread out, with 24.9% under the age of 18, 5.9% from 18 to 24, 27.0% from 25 to 44, 21.5% from 45 to 64, and 20.8% who were 65 years of age or older. The median age was 40 years. For every 100 females, there were 73.3 males. For every 100 females age 18 and over, there were 63.7 males.

The median income for a household in the town was $21,574, and the median income for a family was $30,078. Males had a median income of $26,063 versus $20,000 for females. The per capita income for the town was $14,108. About 18.8% of families and 24.6% of the population were below the poverty line, including 33.5% of those under age 18 and 25.6% of those age 65 or over.

== Education ==
Brantley Public Schools are part of the Crenshaw County School District. Schools in the district include Luverne High School, Highland Home School and Brantley High School. Gregory Fought is the superintendent for the Crenshaw County Board of Education.

== Confederate monument ==
In August 2017, a new Confederate monument was installed in the Confederate Veterans Memorial Park in Brantley.

== Gallery ==
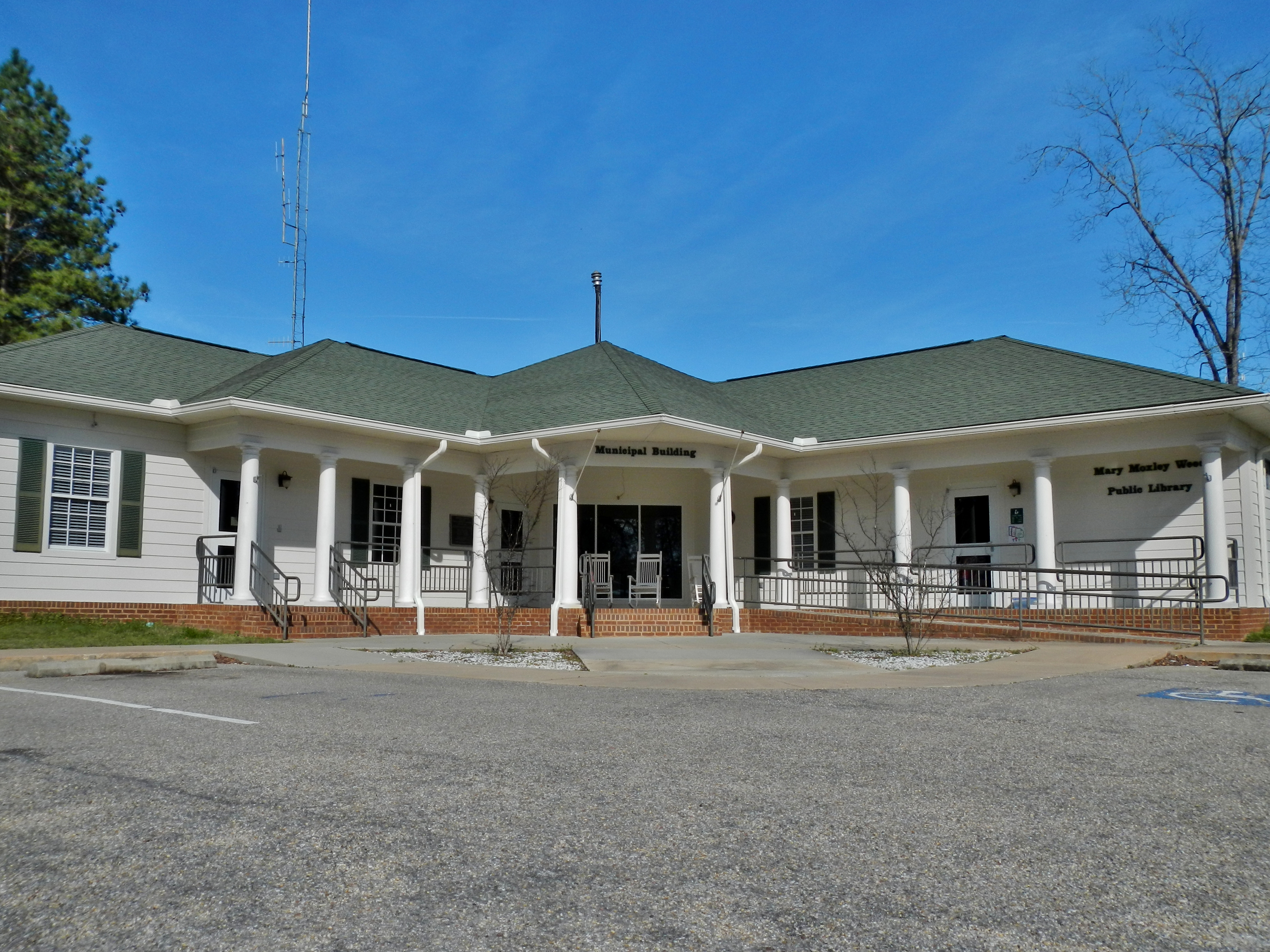
Brantley Municipal Building and Mary Moxley Weed Public Library

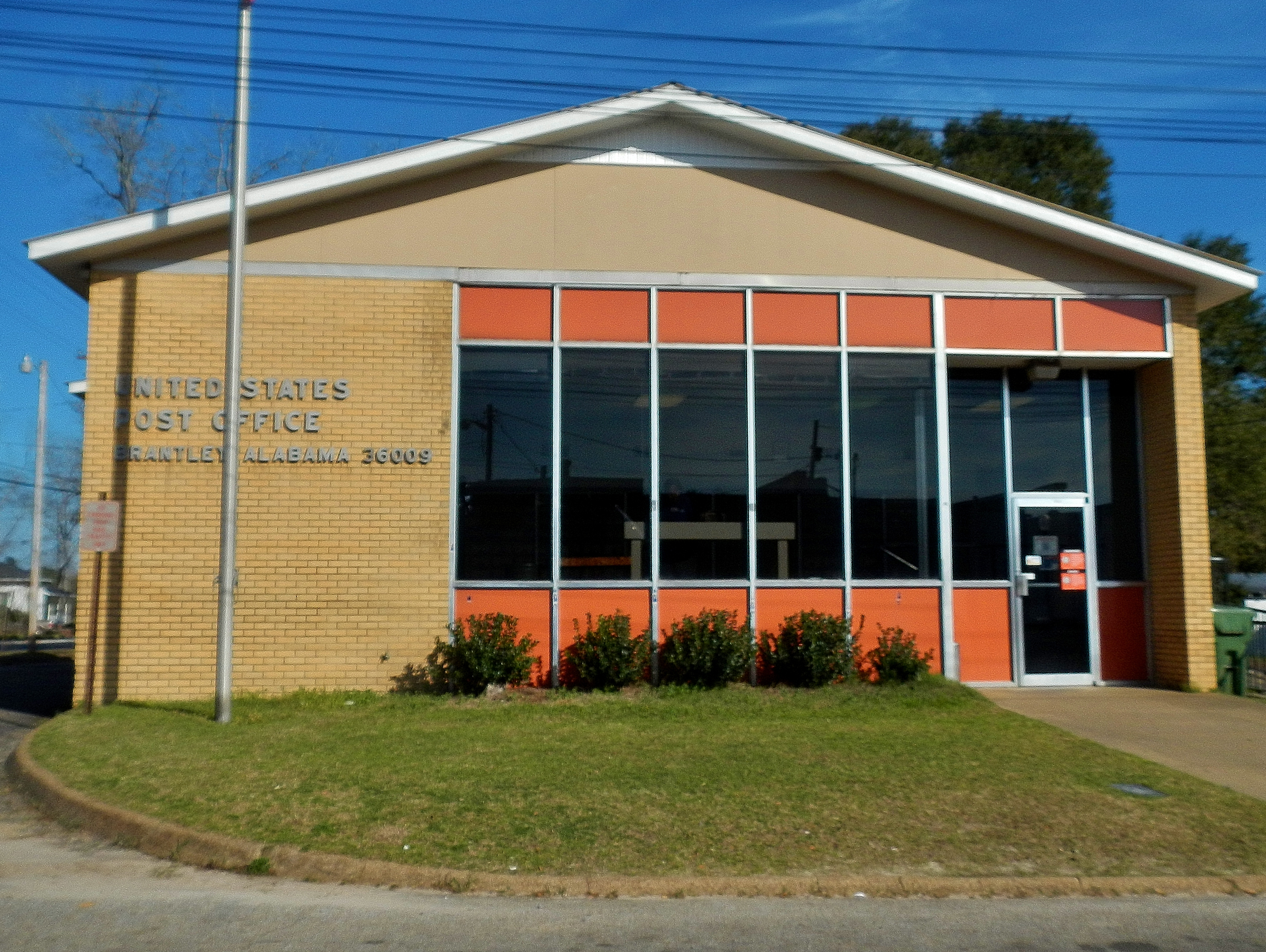
Brantley Post Office (ZIP code: 36009)

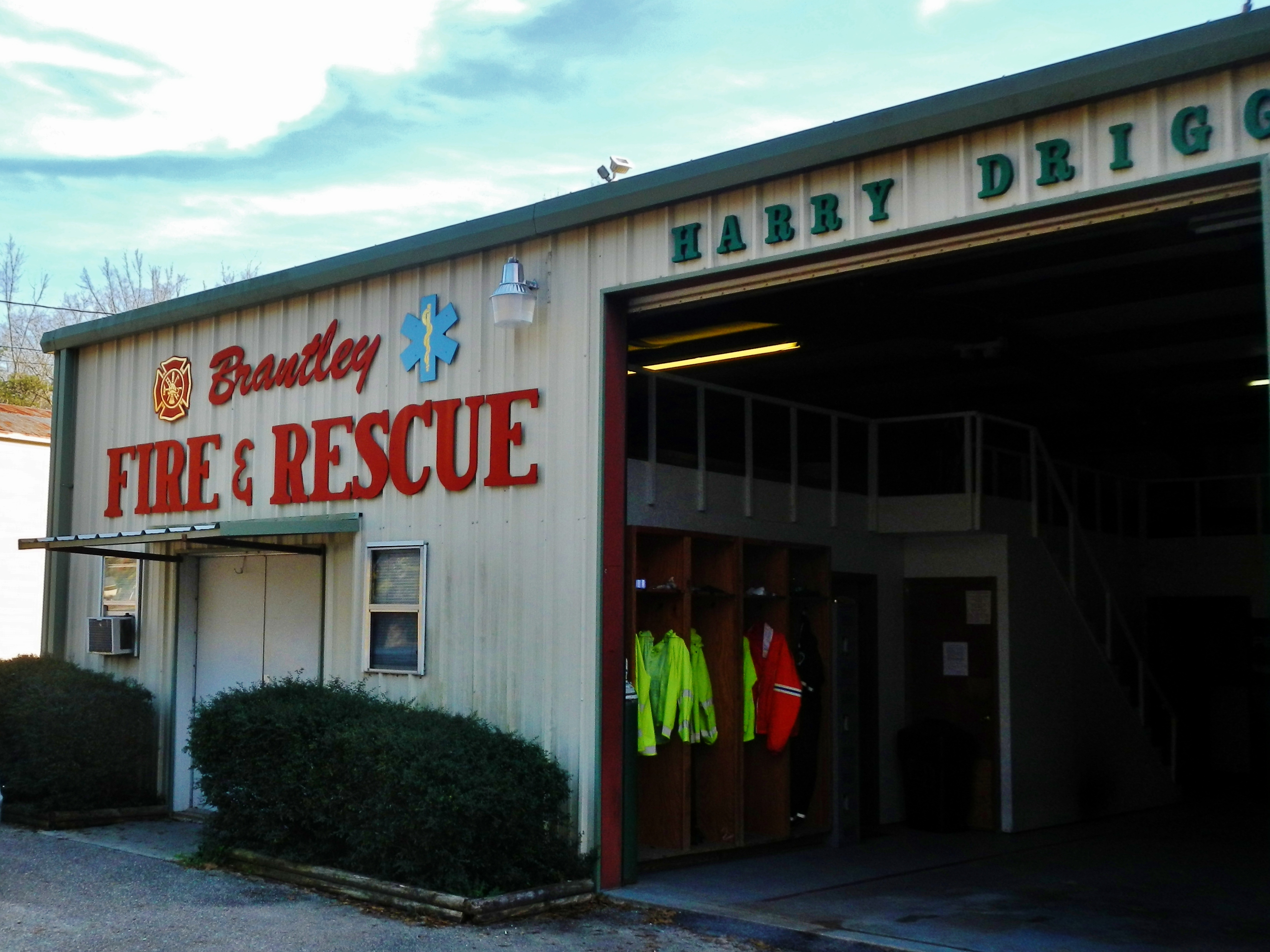
Brantley Fire Department

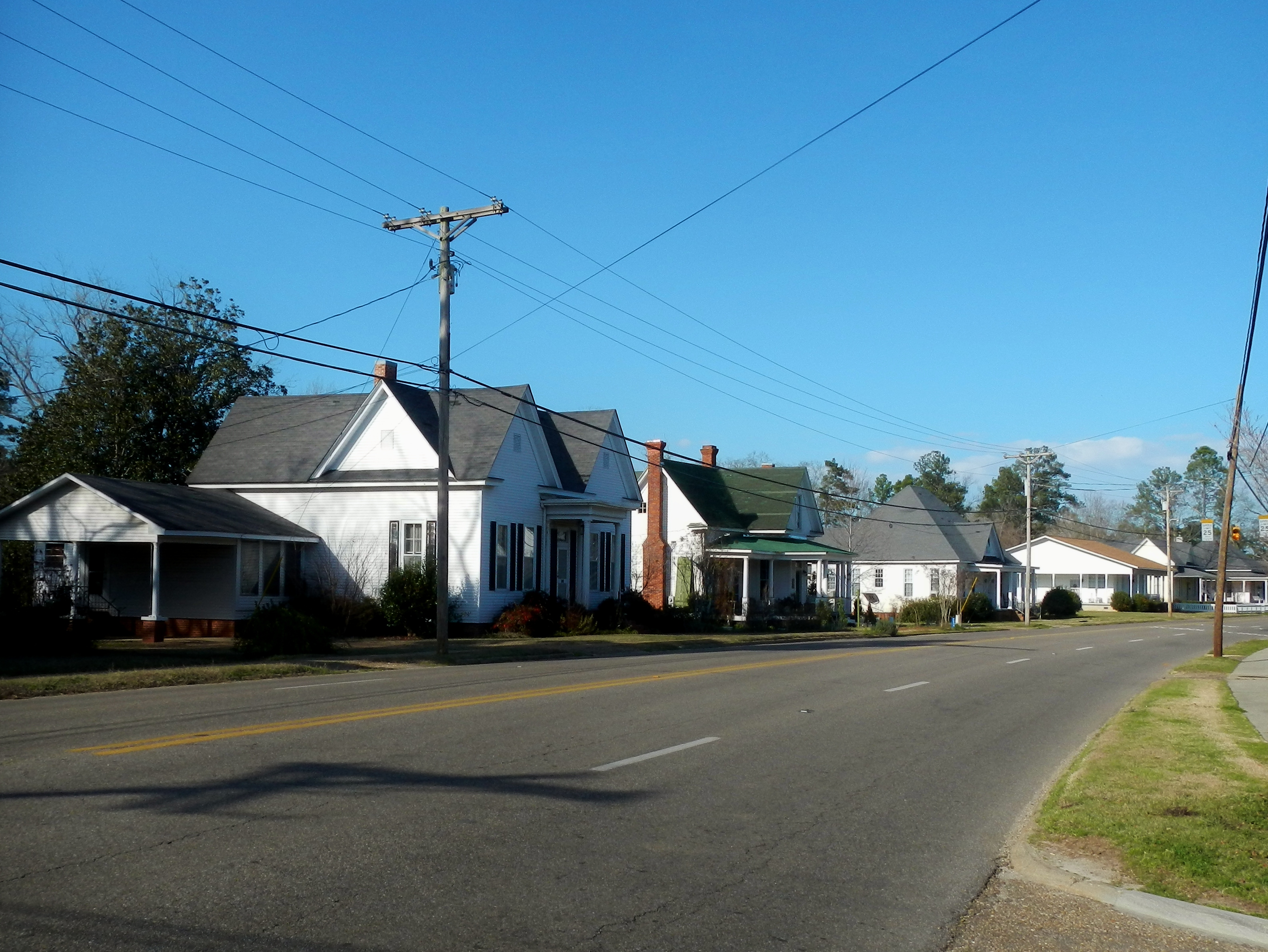
Brantley Historic District was placed on the National Register of Historic Places on June 2, 2004.

== Climate ==
The climate in this area is characterized by hot, humid summers and generally mild to cool winters. According to the Köppen Climate Classification system, Brantley has a humid subtropical climate, abbreviated "Cfa" on climate maps.

Climate data for Brantley, Alabama
Month	Jan	Feb	Mar	Apr	May	Jun	Jul	Aug	Sep	Oct	Nov	Dec	Year
Mean daily maximum °C (°F)	14 (58)	17 (62)	21 (69)	26 (79)	29 (85)	33 (91)	34 (93)	33 (92)	31 (88)	26 (79)	21 (70)	17 (62)	25 (77)
Mean daily minimum °C (°F)	0 (32)	2 (35)	5 (41)	10 (50)	14 (57)	18 (64)	20 (68)	19 (67)	17 (62)	9 (49)	4 (40)	1 (34)	10 (50)
Average precipitation cm (inches)	13 (5)	13 (5.2)	16 (6.3)	12 (4.8)	10 (4.1)	11 (4.4)	15 (6)	14 (5.4)	11 (4.2)	5.8 (2.3)	8.9 (3.5)	12 (4.9)	142 (56.1)
Source: Weatherbase

== Notable residents ==
- Chuck Person, basketball player
- Wesley Person, basketball player
- Wesley Person Jr., basketball player

== See also ==
- WXKD
