= Lizzie Rutherford =

Elizabeth “Lizzie” Rutherford Ellis
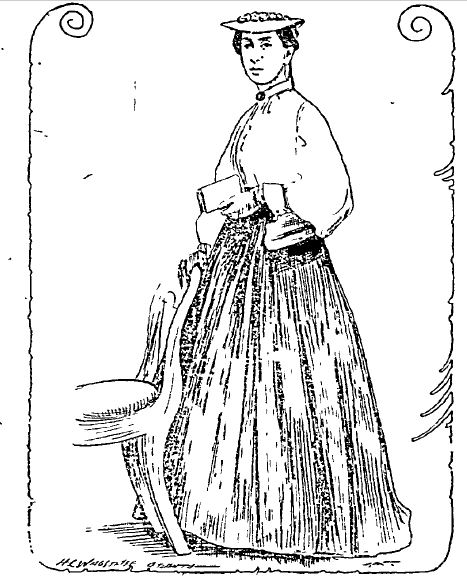
- from Columbus Enquirer, May 1, 1898
- Born: June 1, 1833; Georgia
- Died: March 31, 1873; Columbus, Georgia, United States
- Resting place: Linwood Cemetery, Columbus, Georgia
- Spouse: Capt. Roswell Ellis

Elizabeth Rutherford (later known as Mrs. Roswell Ellis) (1833-1873) was an American woman who is associated with the founding of Confederate Memorial Day, which itself is the forerunner of Memorial Day an annual holiday to decorate soldiers’ graves.

The basis for most biographies of Lizzie Rutherford is A History of the Origin of Memorial Day as Adopted by the Ladies’ Memorial Association of Columbus, Georgia, a revised history of the Memorial Day holiday published in 1898. These biographical sketches include the one in the New Georgia Encyclopedia by David S. Williams and Georgia's Landmarks, Memorials and Legends by Lucian Lamar Knight as well as shorter references like that in Race and Reunion by David Blight. Few delve any deeper.

== Early life and the Civil War ==
Elizabeth Rutherford was the daughter of Adolphus S. Rutherford and Susan Thweatt, born in Columbus, Georgia, on June 1, 1833. Her father was a clerk of the court and represented Muscogee County at the secession convention in 1861, along with Henry Benning and James N. Ramsey. She was active in soldiers’ welfare issues as Secretary of the Soldiers’ Aid Society as well as working personally with the wounded soldiers at local hospitals.

== Post-Civil War ==
Lizzie remained active with the Soldiers’ Aid Society until it the group was reconstituted as the Ladies’ Memorial Association of Columbus, Georgia (LMA) in early 1866.

The LMA, represented by its secretary and Lizzie's cousin, Mrs. Mary Ann Williams (also known as Mrs. Charles J. Williams) wrote a letter to the press proposing a new annual holiday to decorate soldiers’ graves and signed “Southern Women.”

The holiday was inaugurated across the South on April 26, 1866, with wide newspaper coverage in the North. Several stories focused on the observances in Columbus, Mississippi and Macon, Georgia where Union graves were also decorated. The observance in Augusta, Georgia also received a lot of press when a group of former slaves were refused permission to decorate Union graves in that city. On July 4, 1866, General John A. Logan mentioned the observance in a speech in Salem, Illinois.

The observances were repeated in 1867 and 1868. Logan, now commander-in-chief of the Grand Army of the Republic, adopted the holiday for the North on May 30, 1868. The April 26th version of the holiday became known as "Confederate Memorial Day" thereafter. Later that year, Lizzie married Captain Roswell Ellis of the Columbus Guards on November 24, 1868.

Lizzie died on March 31, 1873, and was honored by the soldiers whose welfare she had supported during the war. Mrs. Williams died a year later. Both were honored at subsequent Memorial Day observances.

During their lifetimes, it appears that neither lady personally sought credit for the founding of the holiday. However, after her death, Mrs. Williams was immediately credited for the origination of the holiday.

== Revisions to Memorial Day origin story ==
In the early 1890s, as the next generation of ladies began taking over the LMA, the story of the founding of Memorial Day began to change. In 1891, new headstones were ordered for the soldiers as well as Lizzie and Mrs. Williams. The inscription on Mrs. Williams' headstone reads "Mrs. Charles J. Williams, In loving recognition of her memorial work by her co-workers." Lizzie's headstone reads "The Soldiers' Friend, Lizzie Rutherford Ellis, She hath done what she could. - Mark xiv. 8, A loving tribute to our co-worker, Mrs. Lizzie Rutherford Ellis. In her patriotic heart, sprang the thought of our Memorial Day." This appears to be the first public claim that Lizzie originated the holiday.

In 1898 and with help of the United Daughters of the Confederacy, the LMA revised the history of the organization and put Lizzie forward as the suggestor of the holiday. Affidavits were procured from the two surviving attendees of the LMA organizational meeting; Mrs. Woolfolk and Mrs. Dexter as well as Jane Martin, the daughter of another of the original attendees.

In their book, The Genesis of the Memorial Day Holiday in America, Bellware and Gardiner expose several inconsistencies between the revised story and the historical record.

- LMA claims that it was Lizzie’s idea, as Secretary of the Soldiers’ Aid Society, to reconstitute the group to the LMA with the purpose to memorialize the soldiers in 1866 with a new annual holiday. However, the LMA failed to reward its supposed founder with an officer position in the new organization.
- No mention is made of Lizzie’s contribution to the origin of Memorial Day in her obituary in 1873. By contrast, Mrs. Williams’ earliest death notices and obituary in 1874 clearly credit her with originating the holiday.
- During the bricklaying ceremony on April 1, 1879, Mrs. Woolfolk, who lays a brick in Mrs. Williams’ honor, credits Mrs. Williams with originating the holiday.
- On April 13, 1879, the Columbus Enquirer prints the first history of the LMA and credits Mrs. Williams with originating the holiday.

Bellware and Gardiner also expose the lukewarm support giving by the affidavits.

- Mrs. Woolfolk says that it was common knowledge within the group that Lizzie suggested the holiday but, for her own testimony, she said "Of this, I am not able to speak of my own knowledge."
- Jane Martin, who was supposedly alone with Lizzie when she formulated the idea of the holiday, had to rely on her mother's memory to support the notion that Lizzie was the "suggestor" of the day.

Bellware and Gardiner also pointed out that in 1898, the LMA claimed that it needed to correct the record because Mrs. Williams took credit by publishing the letter proposing the holiday under her own name. This is demonstrably false as the letter was published with the signature "Southern Women" in every known instance. An extensive list of extant contemporaneous publications of the letter can be found here.

At best, it appears that Lizzie simply suggested the day (April 26) to observe the holiday.
