= Nora Fontaine Davidson =

American schoolteacher (1836–1929)

Nora Fontaine Maury Davidson (February 19, 1836 – February 10, 1929) was an American schoolteacher in Petersburg, Virginia. She is credited for holding the first Memorial Day ceremony in Petersburg, and as the inspiration for the United States' Memorial Day.

== Biography ==
Davidson was born in Petersburg, Virginia in 1836; she was locally known as "Miss Nora" and lived there her entire life. With the help of her two sisters, she taught school in Petersburg for 59 years. During the war years, her school was known as the Confederate School and in the postwar years as the Davidson Seminary.

Early in 1861, Davidson headed various fund-raising projects to buy equipment for companies of soldiers forming in Petersburg. Her efforts were most successful in equipping the Ragland Guard, the unit that became Company G, 41st Virginia Infantry. She continued throughout the war to raise money for the soldiers. Davidson was among a group of Petersburg citizens to meet and entertain the first troops arriving there from other Southern states in 1861.

There were no hospitals within the city, and Davidson and others established the Ladies Hospital on Bollingbrook Street. Money raised from various entertainments went into maintaining this hospital. Miss Nora became the hospital’s treasurer, and continued in this capacity until the need for other hospitals arose. When the large Confederate Hospital was established at Poplar Lawn in Petersburg, she served as linen matron until the end of the war.

Davidson was one of the charter members of the Petersburg's Ladies Memorial Association which was organized May 6, 1866. This association took as their objective the reburial of Confederate soldiers who fell on battlefields and were buried there.

== Memorial Day inspiration ==
Blandford Cemetery in Petersburg contained the graves of veterans of six wars, including 30,000 Confederate soldiers killed in the Siege of Petersburg (1864–65) during the American Civil War. After the war ended, Davidson and her school children went to Blandford Cemetery on June 9, 1865 to decorate the graves of the soldiers, commemorating the 125 soldiers who died a year earlier defending Petersburg. One of the graves she cared for was that of her brother, Charles Davidson, a member of Graham's Horse Artillery, who died on December 25, 1863.

While visiting the cemetery, the wife of Union General John A. Logan, observed Davidson and the students putting flowers and tiny Confederate flags on the graves of soldiers. Upon Mary Logan's return to Washington, D.C. and meeting her husband General Logan at the railroad station, she related the story of her visit to Petersburg and how she was moved by what she witnessed there. Upon hearing her story, General Logan, now the first Commander of the Grand Army of the Republic (GAR), replied to her that he would work establish this custom of honoring fallen soldiers across the country. He issued an GAR order, establishing a National Decoration Day, which was later passed by Congress. Today it is known as Memorial Day.

In 2014, Bellware and Gardiner dismissed this claim in The Genesis of the Memorial Day Holiday in America . They point out that General Logan was aware of the southern observances of Memorial Day prior to his wife’s trip to Virginia in 1868 and even mentioned those observances in a speech in 1866 Bellware and Gardiner credit Mary Ann Williams and the Ladies Memorial Association of Columbus, Georgia as the true originators of the holiday as abundant contemporaneous evidence from across the nation exists to substantiate the claim. In fact, a copy of Mrs. Williams' famous letter urging the ladies of the South to annually decorate the soldiers' graves appeared in a Richmond newspaper more than two months before Miss Nora and her school children acted on the request.

== See also ==
- Confederate Memorial Day
- Uniform Monday Holiday Act
