= Decoration Day Ladies of Mississippi =

Decoration Day in Mississippi
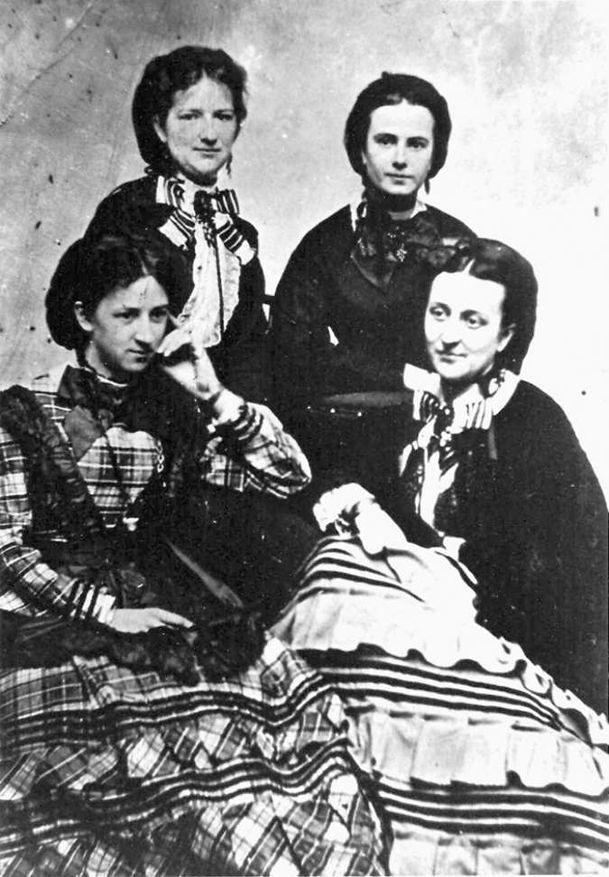
- Decoration Day Ladies: (Seated, left to right) Jane Fontaine, Martha Elizabeth Morton; (Standing, left to right) Kate McCarthy Hill Cooper, Augusta Murdock Sykes Cox.
- Years active: 1862 through 1866
- Country: United States
- Major figures: Kate McCarthy Hill Cooper; Jane Fontaine; Martha Elizabeth Morton; Augusta Murdock Sykes Cox
- Influences: Decoration Day (tradition)
- Influenced: Memorial Day

In the Antebellum South, families and churches had a long tradition of cleaning the burial sites of their cherished dead and decorating the graves with flowers. These decoration days usually took place in spring or early summer when flowers were in full bloom and often included religious memorial services.

== Connection to the American Civil War ==
Following the Battle of Shiloh in April 1862, during the American Civil War, Columbus, Mississippi was selected as a hospital center to treat the wounded and sick soldiers from both the Confederate and Union armies. Soldiers who did not survive medical care in Columbus were interred at Friendship Cemetery. When the war ended in 1865, burial records indicated that up to 1,500 soldiers had been interred in Friendship Cemetery, with up to 150 of those being Union soldiers.

=== Decoration Day ===
As time passed, the graves of Civil War casualties became overgrown by weeds throughout the South. In Columbus, three ladies took on the responsibility of visiting Friendship Cemetery each spring to clear overgrowth from these graves and began the annual tradition of decorating the graves with flowers.

==== Decoration Day ladies ====
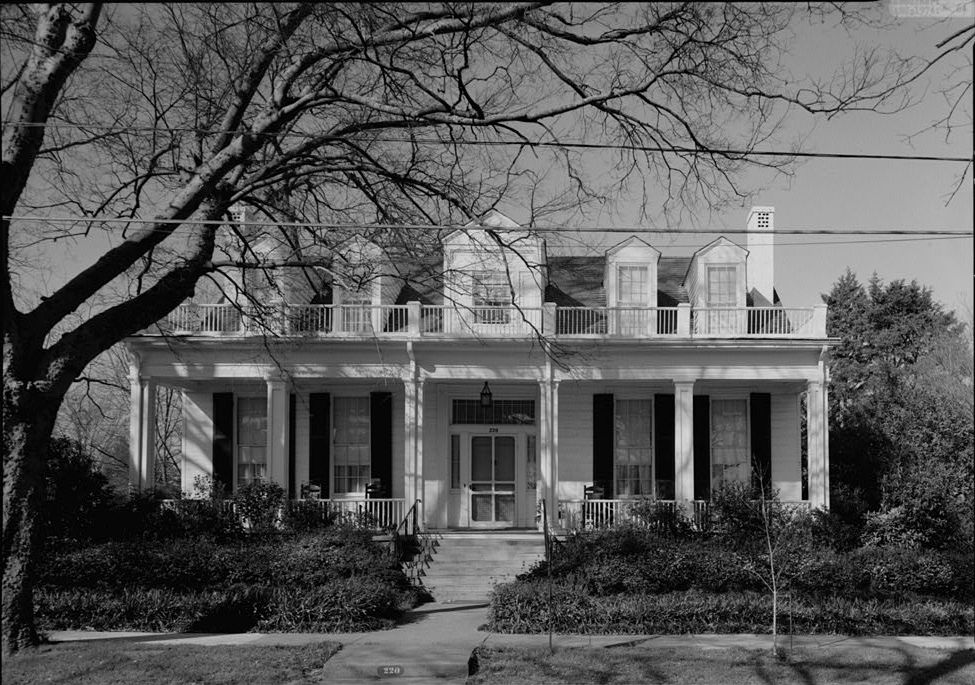
Twelve Gables where Decoration Day plans were made in Columbus, Mississippi

- Martha Elizabeth "Matt" Morton (b. Dec. 1828 – d. Aug. 1904). In 1838, the Mortons arrived in Columbus, Mississippi from Georgia and purchased their home, known as "Twelve Gables". One of their four children, Martha, never married. Her brother, a Confederate military officer, was killed during the Battle of Shiloh. After her father died in 1873, Martha became the head of the household and continued to live at Twelve Gables with her mother, who died in 1888. It was at Twelve Gables where this trio of ladies gathered to lay out their plans for a formal Decoration Day at Friendship Cemetery.
- Kate McCarthy Hill Cooper Heath
- Francis Jane Butler Garrett Fontaine
- A fourth lady, Augusta Murdock Sykes Cox (b. Dec. 1841 – d. June 1921), was the widow of a Confederate officer – Dr. William Edmunds Sykes – who was killed in action near Decatur, Alabama in 1864. Mrs. Sykes encouraged the other ladies to decorate the 40 marked graves of Union soldiers in Friendship Cemetery the same as the 1,400 marked Confederate graves.

The efforts of these ladies expanded to a group of women (both young and old) throughout Columbus that resulted in the creation of a formal Decoration Day on April 25, 1866. On that date, a large group of women from Columbus proceeded to Friendship Cemetery. At the head of the procession were the youngest women and girls dressed in white and carrying flowers and wreaths. They were followed by matrons wearing black to mourn their dead relatives. At the rear of the procession were horse-drawn carriages bearing elderly matrons.

The first formal Decoration Day event was described by James A. Stevens (ed), in the [Columbus] Mississippi Index on April 26, 1866, after the procession arrived at Friendship Cemetery:

The ladies assembled around the graves of the soldiers in the form of a square; from the center of the ground, an elaborate and eloquent address was delivered by Rev. G.T. Stainback, and following it, a fervent prayer by Rev. A.S. Andrews. The ladies then performed the beautiful and touching duty of decorating the graves with flowers. … There were over 1400 graves to be decorated. ... We were glad to see that no distinction was made between our own dead and about forty Federal soldiers, who slept their last sleep by them. It proved the exalted, unselfish tone of the female character. Confederate and Federal — once enemies, now friends — receiving this tribute of respect.

This event marked the first recorded instance where the graves of both Confederate and Union soldiers were decorated.

As word spread throughout the US, the Columbus ladies' selfless act of kindness – to treat both Confederate and Union dead as equals – inspired poet Francis Miles Finch to write the poem, The Blue and the Gray, which was published in an 1867 edition of The Atlantic Monthly.

In 1867, the remains of all Union soldiers were exhumed from Friendship Cemetery and were reinterred in Corinth National Cemetery.

== Legacy ==
- The four Decoration Day ladies were subsequently inducted into the Mississippi Hall of Fame to honor their significant contribution to the state. A portrait of the four Decoration Day ladies is on display in Mississippi's Old Capitol Museum in Jackson.

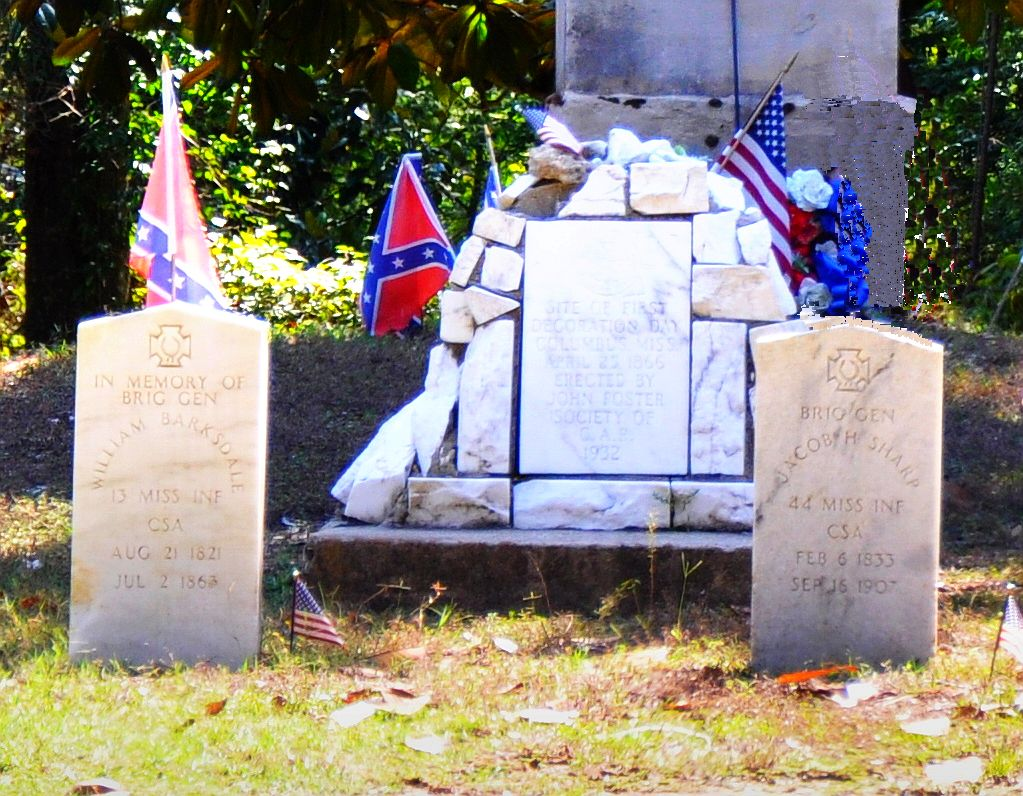
Confederate Decoration Day Monument in Friendship Cemetery

- In 1932, a marble and granite monument was placed in Friendship Cemetery by the John Foster Society of the Children of the American Revolution to memorialize April 25, 1866 as the inauguration date for Decoration Day in Columbus, Mississippi.
- Over time, these decoration days – honoring those who died in military service – eventually transformed into Memorial Day.

== See also ==
- Confederate Memorial Day
- Commemoration of the American Civil War
