= Friendship Cemetery =

- U.S. National Register of Historic Places
- Mississippi Landmark
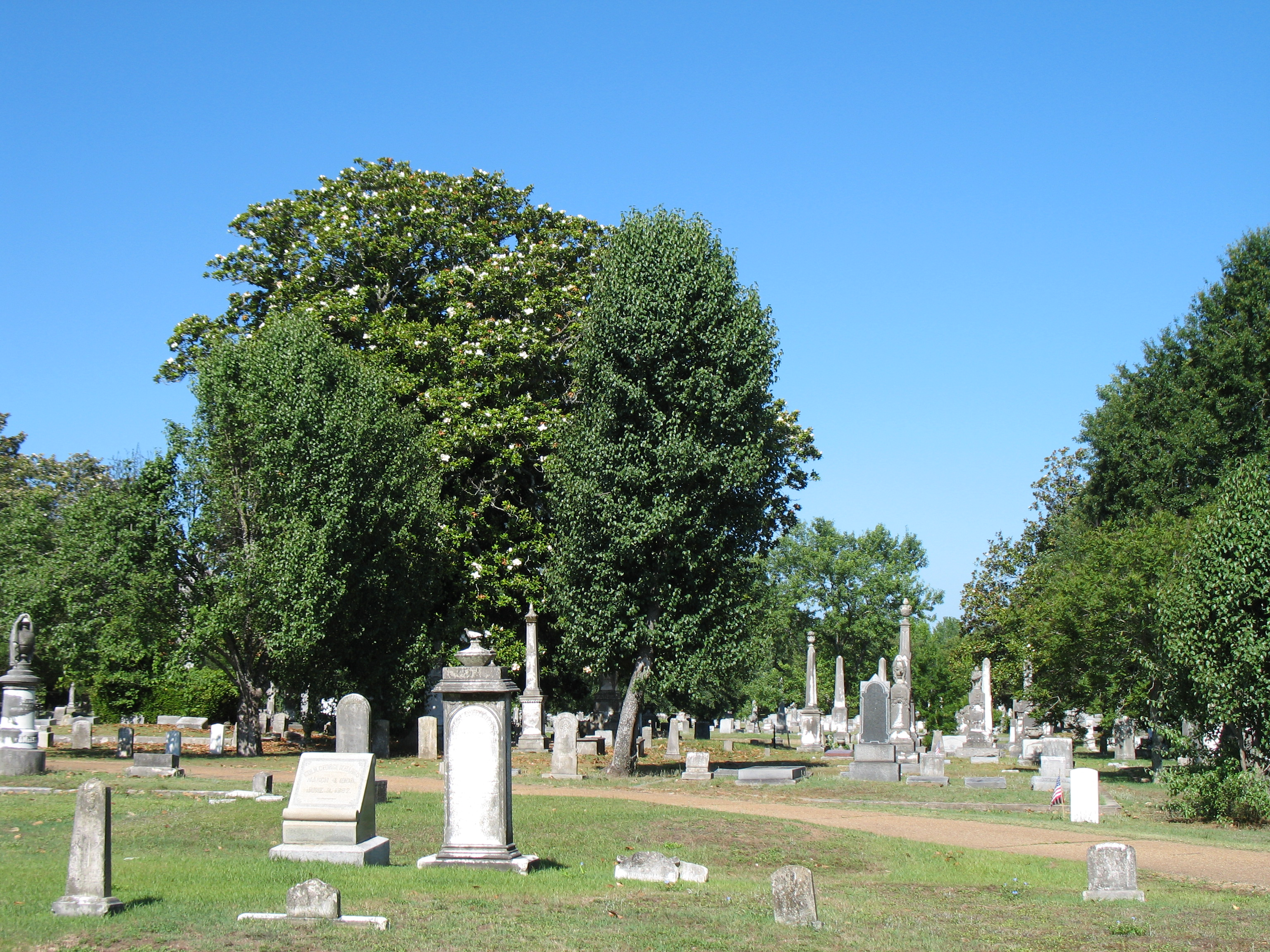
- View within Friendship Cemetery

- Location within Mississippi Location within the United States
- Location: 1300 4th Street South, Columbus, Mississippi
- Coordinates: 33°28′51″N 88°25′50″W
- Area: 70 acres (28 ha)
- Built: 1849
- NRHP reference No.: 80002287
- USMS No.: 087-CBS-1601-NR-ML

Significant dates
- Added to NRHP: July 23, 1980
- Designated USMS: December 14, 1989

Friendship Cemetery is a cemetery located in Columbus, Mississippi. In 1849, the cemetery was established on 5 acres by the Independent Order of Odd Fellows. The original layout consisted of three interlocking circles, signifying the Odd Fellows emblem. By 1957, Friendship Cemetery had increased in size to 35 acres, and was acquired by the City of Columbus. The cemetery was listed on the National Register of Historic Places in 1980 and was designated a Mississippi Landmark in 1989. As of 2015, the cemetery contained some 22,000 graves within an area of 70 acres and was still in use. The Mississippi School for Mathematics and Science hosts a public event every April at night in the cemetery. Students complete a research project on someone buried at the cemetery, before dressing up and doing a performance as the person they researched.

== Memorial Day connection ==
During the American Civil War, Columbus served as a military hospital center for the wounded, particularly after the Battle of Shiloh. More than 2,000 Confederate soldiers were interred in Friendship Cemetery, along with 40 to 150 Union soldiers.

In 1866, four women, who became known as the Decoration Day Ladies, organized a formal procession and ceremony to be held at Friendship Cemetery on April 26 so that a large group of Columbus women, both young and old, could place flowers atop the graves of these fallen Confederate and Union soldiers. The women's tribute – treating the soldiers as equals – inspired poet Francis Miles Finch to write the poem, The Blue and the Gray, which was published in an 1867 edition of The Atlantic Monthly. In 1867, the remains of all Union soldiers were exhumed and reinterred in Corinth National Cemetery. Over time, these grave decoration days – honoring those who died in military service – eventually morphed into Memorial Day.

=== Monuments ===
The cemetery contains two Confederate monuments:

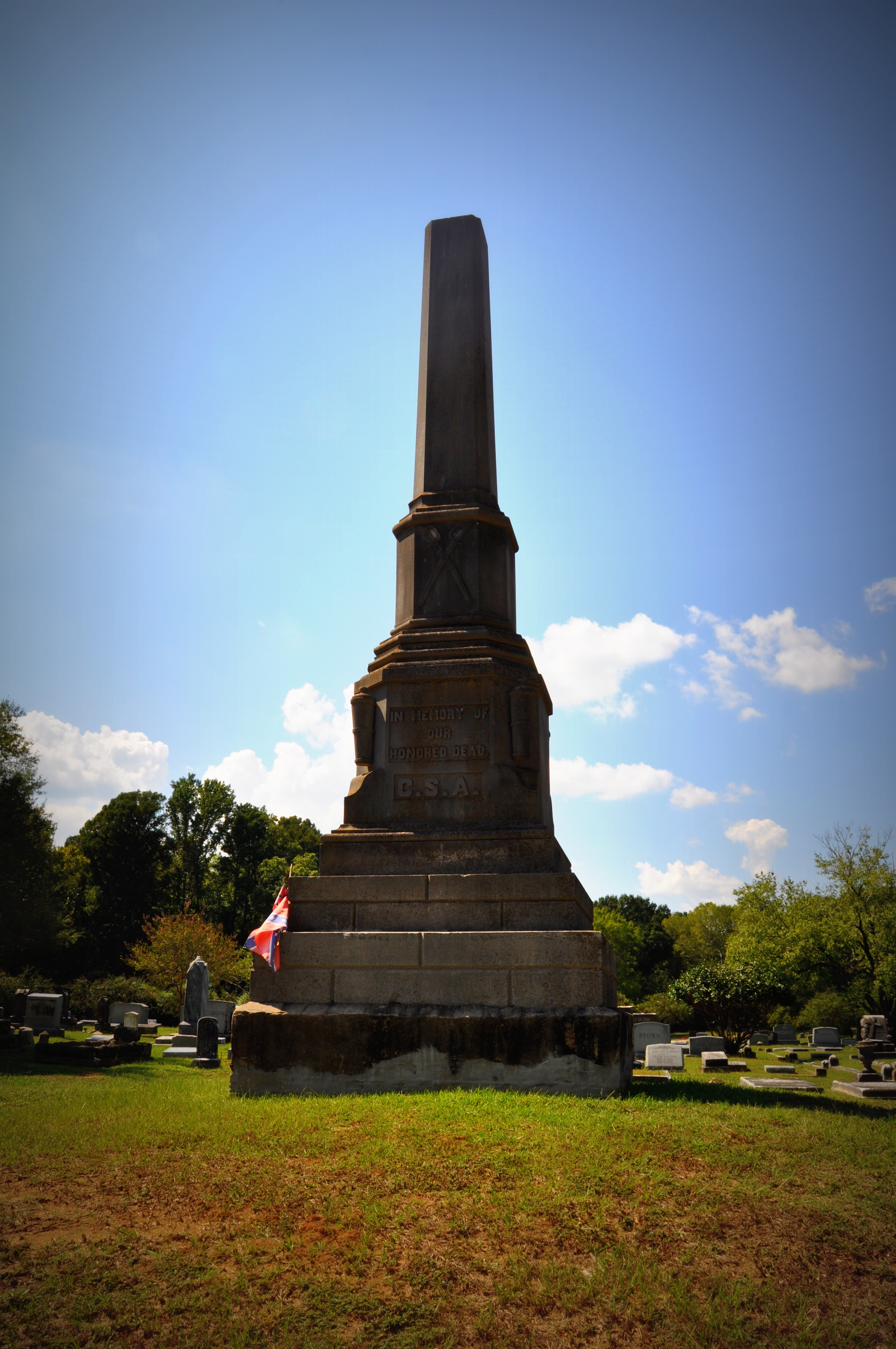
Monument to Confederate dead (1873)

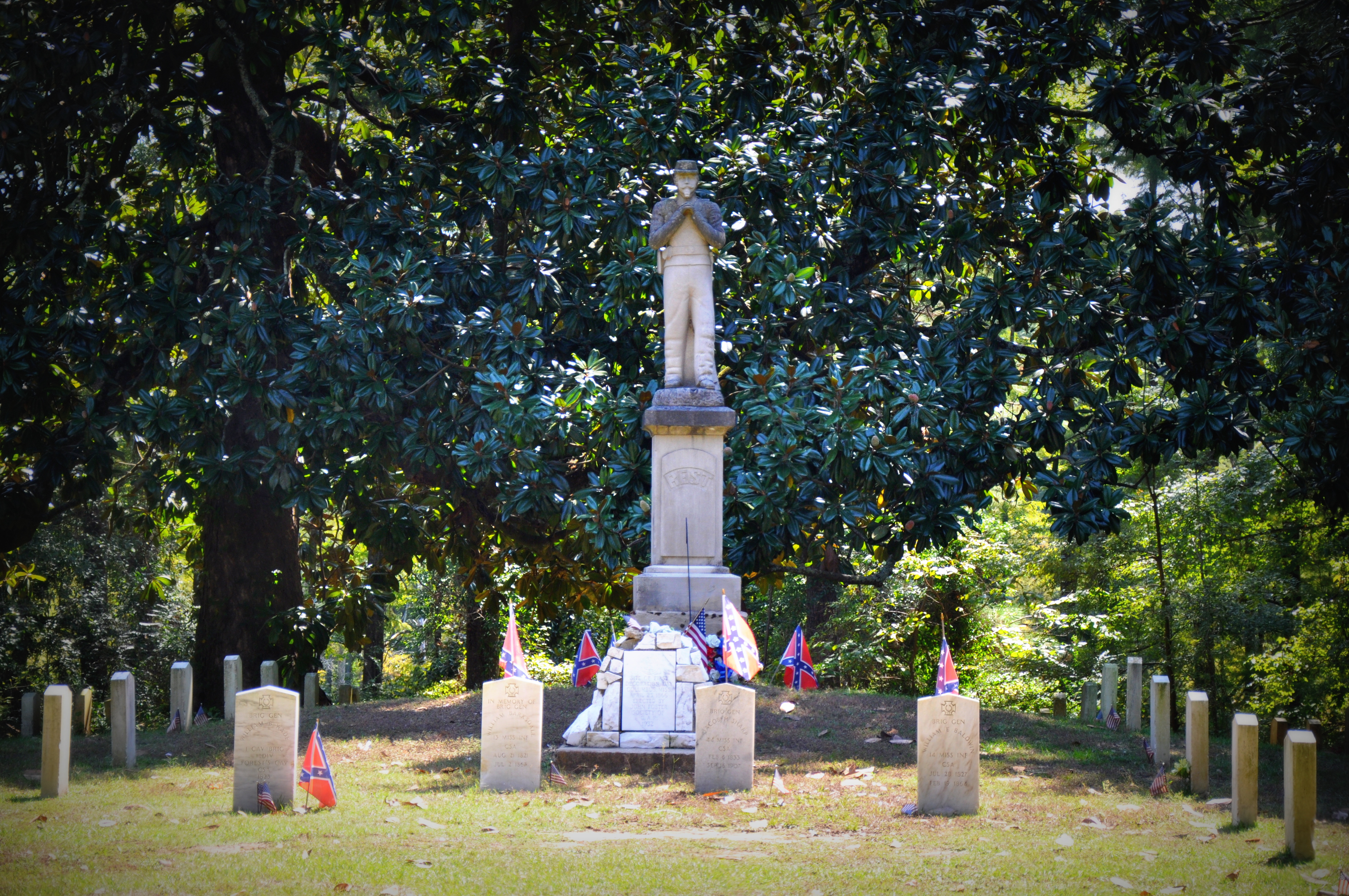
Monument to an unknown Confederate soldier (1894)

== Notable interments ==
- William Edwin Baldwin (1827–1864), Confederate brigadier general during the American Civil War.
- William Barksdale (1821–1863), Confederate brigadier general during the American Civil War. Cenotaph only, Barksdale's remains were interred in Greenwood Cemetery (Jackson, Mississippi).
- William S. Barry (1821–1868), member of the Provisional Congress of the Confederate States (1861–62).
- William Cocke (1748–1828), U.S. Senator from Tennessee (1796–97, 1799–1805).
- Cornell Franklin (1892–1959), judge who served as chairman of the Shanghai Municipal Council (1937–40).
- Jeptha Vining Harris (1816–1899), Confederate brigadier general during the American Civil War.
- James Thomas Harrison (1811–1879), member of the Provisional Congress of the Confederate States (1861–62).
- Clyde S. Kilby (1902–1986), noted American author and English professor.
- Stephen Dill Lee (1833–1908), Confederate lieutenant general during the American Civil War.
- Joshua Lawrence Meador (1911–1965), Disney animator.
- Jehu Amaziah Orr (1828–1921), member of the Provisional Congress of the Confederate States and the Second Confederate Congress.
- Jacob H. Sharp (1833–1907), Confederate brigadier general during the American Civil War.
- Jesse Speight (1795–1847), U.S. Senator from Mississippi (1845–47).
- Henry Edward Warden (1915–2007), Career officer in the US Air Force; father of the B-52.
- Henry Lewis Whitfield (1868–1927), Governor of Mississippi (1924–27).
- James Whitfield (1791–1875), Governor of Mississippi (1851–52).
