= Memorial Day =

Federal holiday in the United States

- Arlington National Cemetery graves decorated with flags during Memorial Day weekend
- Observed by: United States
- Type: National Holiday
- Significance: Honors U.S. military personnel who died in service
- Observances: Decoration of military graves with American flags
- Date: Last Monday in May
- 2025 date: May 26
- 2026 date: May 25
- 2027 date: May 31
- 2028 date: May 29
- Frequency: Annual
- First time: May 30, 1868

Memorial Day is a federal holiday in the United States for mourning the U.S. military personnel who died while serving in the U.S. Armed Forces. It is observed on the last Monday of May.

Memorial Day is a time for visiting cemeteries and memorials to mourn the military personnel who died in the line of duty. Volunteers will place American flags on the graves of those military personnel in national cemeteries.

The first national observance of what would become Memorial Day occurred on May 30, 1868. Then known as Decoration Day, the holiday was proclaimed by Commander-in-Chief John A. Logan of the Grand Army of the Republic – a fraternal organization of veterans – to honor Union soldiers who had died in the American Civil War. This national observance followed the example of many local observances which were begun between the end of the Civil War and Logan's declaration. Many cities and people have claimed to be the first to observe it, however, the National Cemetery Administration, a division of the Department of Veterans Affairs, credits Mary Ann Williams of the Ladies Memorial Association of Columbus, Georgia, with originating the idea of an annual date to decorate the graves of Civil War veterans with flowers.

Official recognition as a holiday spread among the states, beginning with New York in 1873. In 1888, it became a legal federal holiday. By 1890, every state had adopted it. The world wars turned it into a day of remembrance for all members of the U.S. military who fought and died in service. In 1968, Congress changed its observance to the last Monday in May, and in 1971 standardized its name as "Memorial Day.” Two other days celebrate those who have served or are serving in the U.S. military: Armed Forces Day, which is earlier in May, a ceremonial U.S. day of commemoration for honoring those currently serving in the armed forces, and Veterans Day on November 11, a legal holiday which honors all those who have served in the United States Armed Forces.

== Origins ==
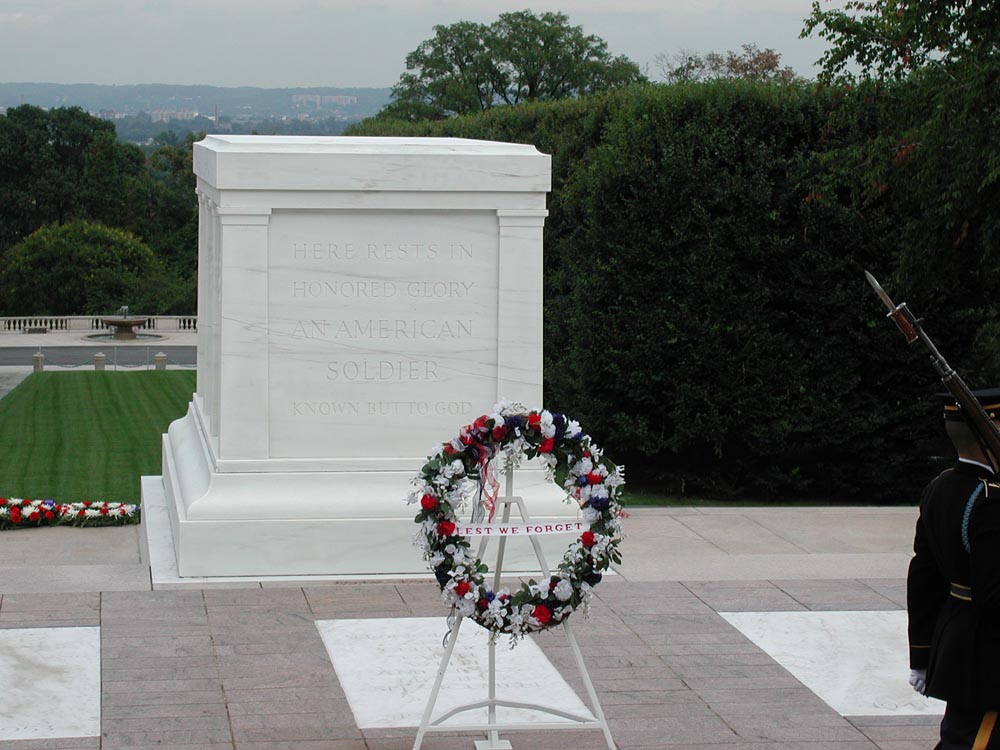
The Tomb of the Unknown Soldier

A variety of cities and people have claimed origination of Memorial Day. In some such cases, the claims relate to documented events, occurring before or after the Civil War. Others may stem from general traditions of decorating soldiers' graves with flowers, rather than specific events leading to the national proclamation. Soldiers' graves were decorated in the U.S. before and during the American Civil War. Other claims may be less respectable, appearing to some researchers as taking credit without evidence, while erasing better-evidenced events or connections.

== Precedents in the South ==
=== Warrenton, Virginia ===
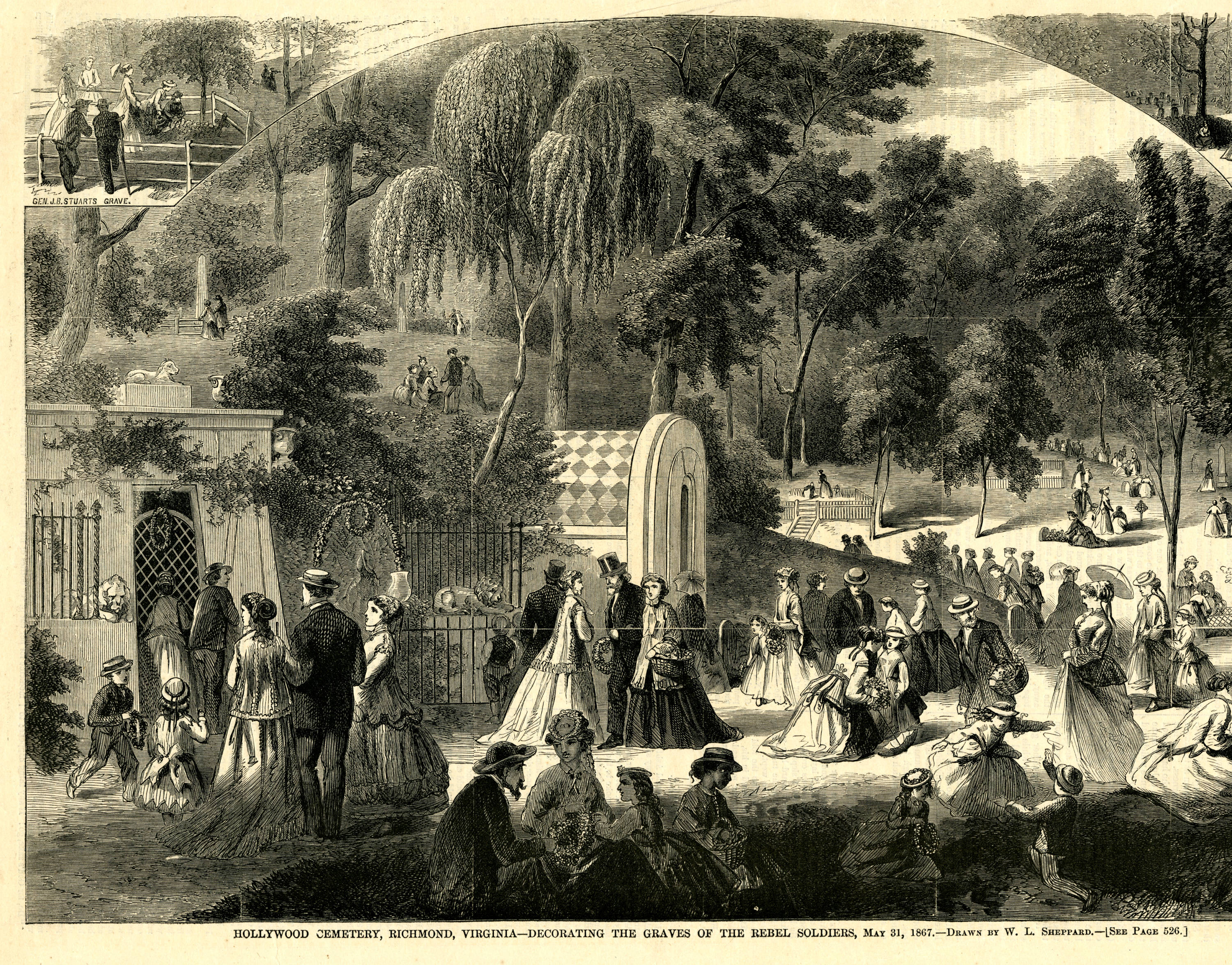
1867 Decoration Day in Richmond, Virginia's Hollywood Cemetery

On June 3, 1861, Warrenton, Virginia, was the location of the first Civil War soldier's grave to be decorated, according to an article in the Richmond Times-Dispatch in 1906. This decoration was for the funeral of the first soldier killed during the Civil War, John Quincy Marr, who died on June 1, 1861, during a skirmish at the Battle of Fairfax Courthouse in Virginia.

=== Jackson, Mississippi ===
On April 26, 1865, in Jackson, Mississippi, Sue Landon Vaughan decorated the graves of Confederate and Union soldiers, according to her account. The first reference to this event however did not appear until many years later. Mention of the observance is inscribed on the southeast panel of the Confederate Monument in Jackson, erected in 1891. Vaughan's account is contradicted by contemporary sources.

=== Charleston, South Carolina ===
On May 1, 1865, in Charleston, South Carolina, the recently freed Black population held a parade of 10,000 people to honor 257 dead Union soldiers. The soldiers had been buried in a mass grave at the Washington Race Course, having died at the Confederate prison camp located there. After the city fell, the freed Black population unearthed and properly buried the soldiers, placing flowers at their graves. The event was reported contemporaneously in the Charleston Daily Courier and the New-York Tribune. Historian David Blight has called this commemoration the first Memorial Day. However, no direct link has been established between this event and General John Logan's 1868 proclamation for a national holiday.

=== Columbus, Georgia ===
. . . [W]e can keep alive the memory of debt we owe them by dedicating at least one day in the year, by embellishing their humble graves with flowers, therefore we beg the assistance of the press and the ladies throughout the South to help us in the effort to set apart a certain day to be observed, from the Potomac to the Rio Grande and be handed down through time as a religious custom of the country, to wreathe the graves of our martyred dead with flowers. ... Let the soldiers’ graves, for that day at least, be the Southern Mecca, to whose shrine her sorrowing women, like pilgrims, may annually bring their grateful hearts and floral offerings ...

— Mary Ann Williams, March 11, 1866

The National Cemetery Administration, a division of the Department of Veterans Affairs, and scholars attribute the beginning of a Memorial Day practice in the South to a group of women of Columbus, Georgia. The women were the Ladies Memorial Association of Columbus. They were represented by Mary Ann Williams (Mrs. Charles J. Williams) who as association secretary wrote an open letter to the press on March 11, 1866 asking for assistance in establishing an annual holiday to decorate the graves of soldiers throughout the South. The letter was reprinted in several southern states and the plans were noted in newspapers in the North. The date of April 26 was chosen, which corresponded with the end date of the war with the surrender agreement between Generals Johnston and Sherman in 1865.

The holiday was observed in Atlanta, Augusta, Macon, Columbus and elsewhere in Georgia as well as Montgomery, Alabama; Memphis, Tennessee; Louisville, Kentucky; New Orleans, Louisiana; Jackson, Mississippi, and across the South. In some cities, mostly in Virginia, other dates in May and June were observed. General John Logan commented on the observances in a speech to veterans on July 4, 1866, in Salem, Illinois. After General Logan's General Order No. 11 to the Grand Army of the Republic to observe May 30, 1868, the earlier version of the holiday began to be referred to as Confederate Memorial Day.

=== Columbus, Mississippi ===
Following Mary Williams' call for assistance, four women of Columbus, Mississippi a day early on April 25, 1866, gathered together at Friendship Cemetery to decorate the graves of the Confederate soldiers. They also felt moved to honor the Union soldiers buried there, and to note the grief of their families, by decorating their graves as well. The story of their gesture of humanity and reconciliation is held by some writers as the inspiration of the original Memorial Day.

=== Other Southern precedents ===
According to the United States Library of Congress, "Southern women decorated the graves of soldiers even before the Civil War’s end. Records show that by 1865, Mississippi, Virginia, and South Carolina all had precedents for Memorial Day." The earliest Southern Memorial Day celebrations were simple, somber occasions for veterans and their families to honor the dead and tend to local cemeteries. In following years, the Ladies' Memorial Association and other groups increasingly focused rituals on preserving Confederate culture and the Lost Cause of the Confederacy narrative.

== Precedents in the North ==
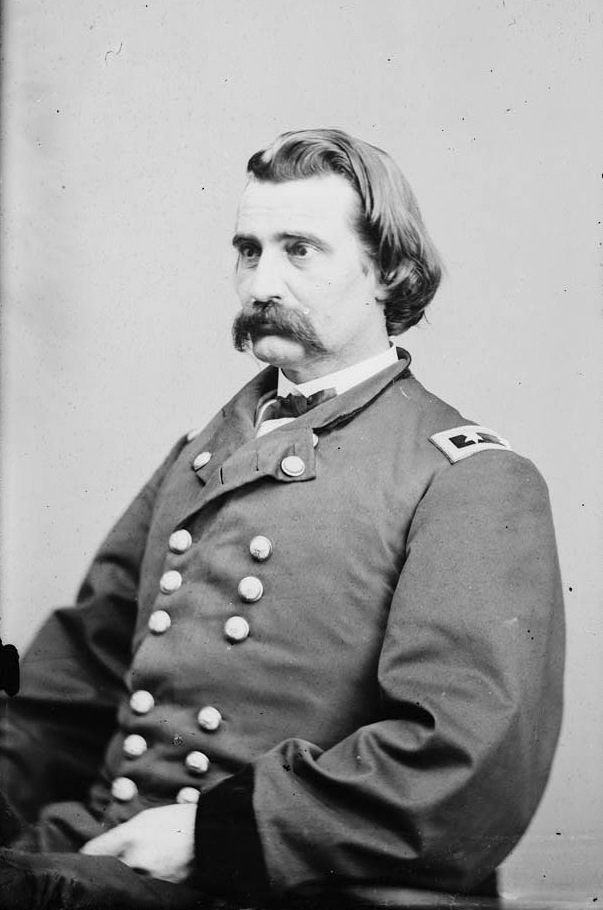
General John A. Logan, who in 1868 issued a proclamation calling for a national "Decoration Day"

=== Gettysburg, Pennsylvania ===
The 1863 cemetery dedication at Gettysburg, Pennsylvania, included a ceremony of commemoration at the graves of dead soldiers. Some have therefore claimed that President Abraham Lincoln was the founder of Memorial Day. However, Chicago journalist Lloyd Lewis tried to make the case that it was Lincoln's funeral that spurred the soldiers' grave decorating that followed.

=== Boalsburg, Pennsylvania ===
On July 4, 1864, ladies decorated soldiers' graves according to local historians in Boalsburg, Pennsylvania. Boalsburg promotes itself as the birthplace of Memorial Day. However, no published reference to this event has been found earlier than the printing of the History of the 148th Pennsylvania Volunteers in 1904. In a footnote to a story about her brother, Mrs. Sophie (Keller) Hall described how she and Emma Hunter decorated the grave of Emma's father, Reuben Hunter, and then the graves of all soldiers in the cemetery. The original story did not account for Reuben Hunter's death occurring two months later on September 19, 1864. It also did not mention Mrs. Elizabeth Myers as one of the original participants. A bronze statue of all three women gazing upon Reuben Hunter's grave now stands near the entrance to the Boalsburg Cemetery. Although July 4, 1864, was a Monday, the town now claims that the original decoration was on one of the Sundays in October 1864.

=== National Decoration Day ===
... Let us then gather around their sacred remains and garland the passionless mounds above them with the choicest flowers of Springtime; let us raise above them the dear old flag they saved from dishonor; let us in this solemn presence renew our pledges to aid and assist those whom they have left among us as a sacred charge upon a Nation's gratitude—the soldiers' and sailors' widow and orphan.

— John A. Logan, May 5, 1868

On May 5, 1868, General John A. Logan issued a proclamation calling for "Decoration Day" to be observed annually and nationwide; he was commander-in-chief of the Grand Army of the Republic (GAR), an organization of and for Union Civil War veterans founded in Decatur, Illinois. With his proclamation, Logan adopted the Memorial Day practice that had begun in the Southern states two years earlier. The northern states quickly adopted the holiday. In 1868, memorial events were held in 183 cemeteries in 27 states, and 336 in 1869. At least one author asserts that the date, May 30, was chosen because it was not the anniversary of any particular battle. Logan's wife noted that the date was chosen because it was the optimal date for flowers to be in bloom in the North.

=== State holiday ===
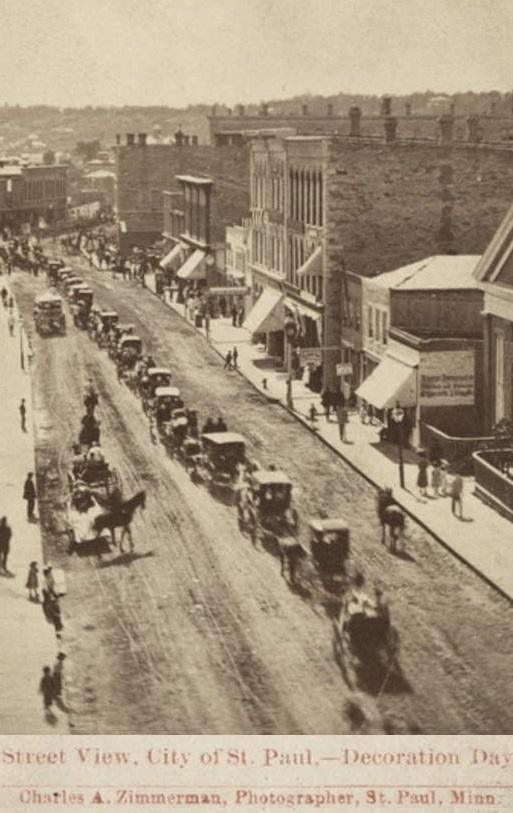
The 1870 Decoration Day parade in St. Paul, Minnesota

In 1873, New York made Decoration Day an official state holiday and by 1890, every northern state had followed suit. There was no standard program for the ceremonies, but they were typically sponsored by the Women's Relief Corps, the women's auxiliary of the Grand Army of the Republic (GAR), which had 100,000 members. By 1870, the remains of nearly 300,000 Union dead had been reinterred in 73 national cemeteries, located near major battlefields and thus mainly in the South. The most famous are Gettysburg National Cemetery in Pennsylvania and Arlington National Cemetery, near Washington, D.C.

=== Waterloo proclamation ===
On May 26, 1966, President Lyndon B. Johnson designated an "official" birthplace of the holiday by signing the presidential proclamation naming Waterloo, New York, as the holder of the title. This action followed House Concurrent Resolution 587, in which the 89th Congress had officially recognized that the patriotic tradition of observing Memorial Day had begun one hundred years prior in Waterloo, New York. The legitimacy of this claim has been called into question by several scholars.

== Early national history ==
In April 1865, following Lincoln's assassination, commemorations were extensive. The more than 600,000 soldiers of both sides who fought and died in the Civil War meant that burial and memorialization took on new cultural significance. Under the leadership of women during the war, an increasingly formal practice of decorating graves had taken shape. In 1865, the federal government also began creating the United States National Cemetery System for the Union war dead.

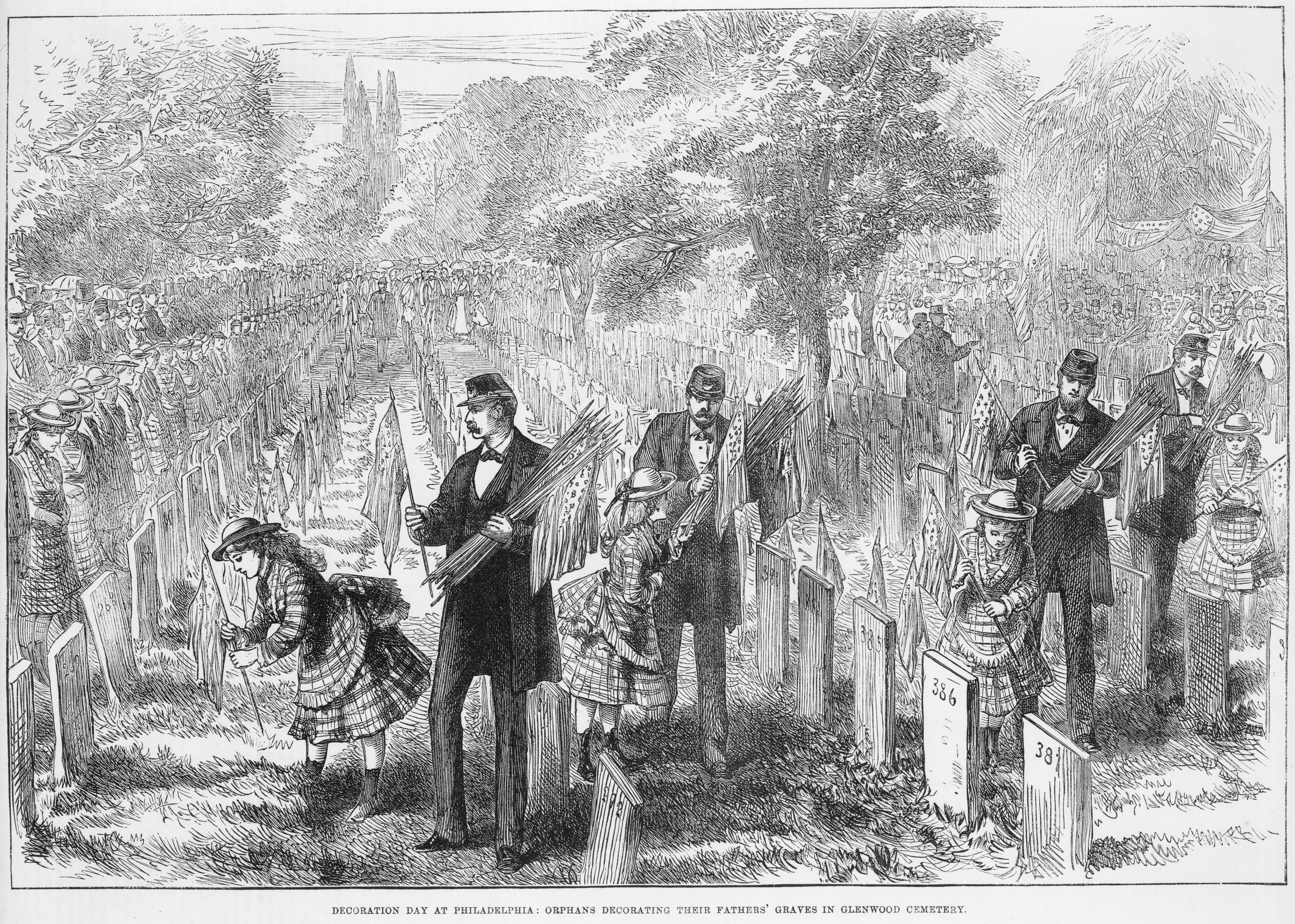
Orphans placing flags at their fathers' graves in Glenwood Cemetery in Philadelphia on Decoration Day

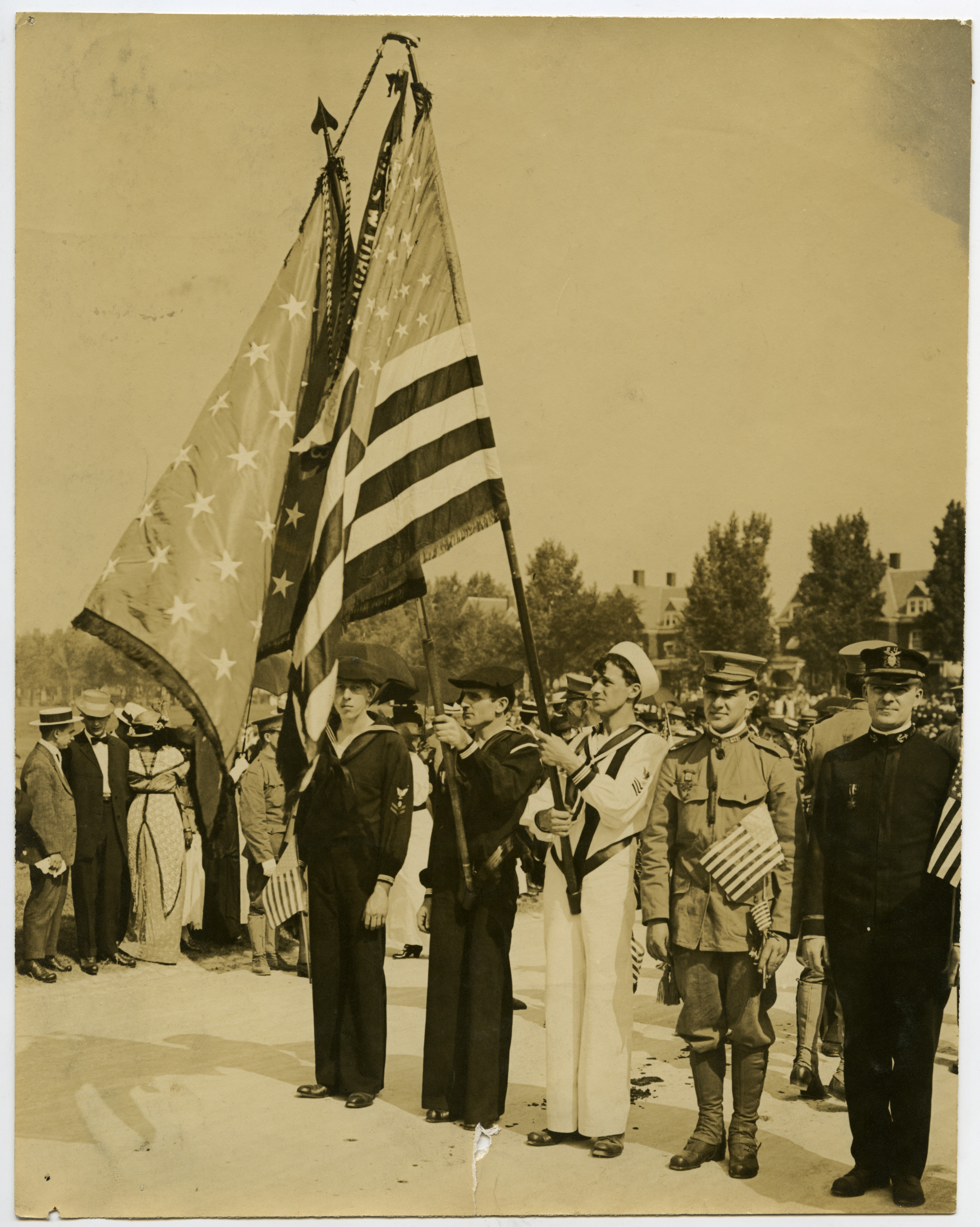
Decoration Day, Jefferson Barracks, MO., circa 1914–1918. Missouri History Museum.

By the 1880s, ceremonies were becoming more consistent across geography as the GAR provided handbooks that presented specific procedures, poems, and Bible verses for local post commanders to utilize in planning the local event. Historian Stuart McConnell reports:

on the day itself, the post assembled and marched to the local cemetery to decorate the graves of the fallen, an enterprise meticulously organized months in advance to assure that none were missed. Finally came a simple and subdued graveyard service involving prayers, short patriotic speeches, and music ... and at the end perhaps a rifle salute.

=== Confederate Memorial Day ===
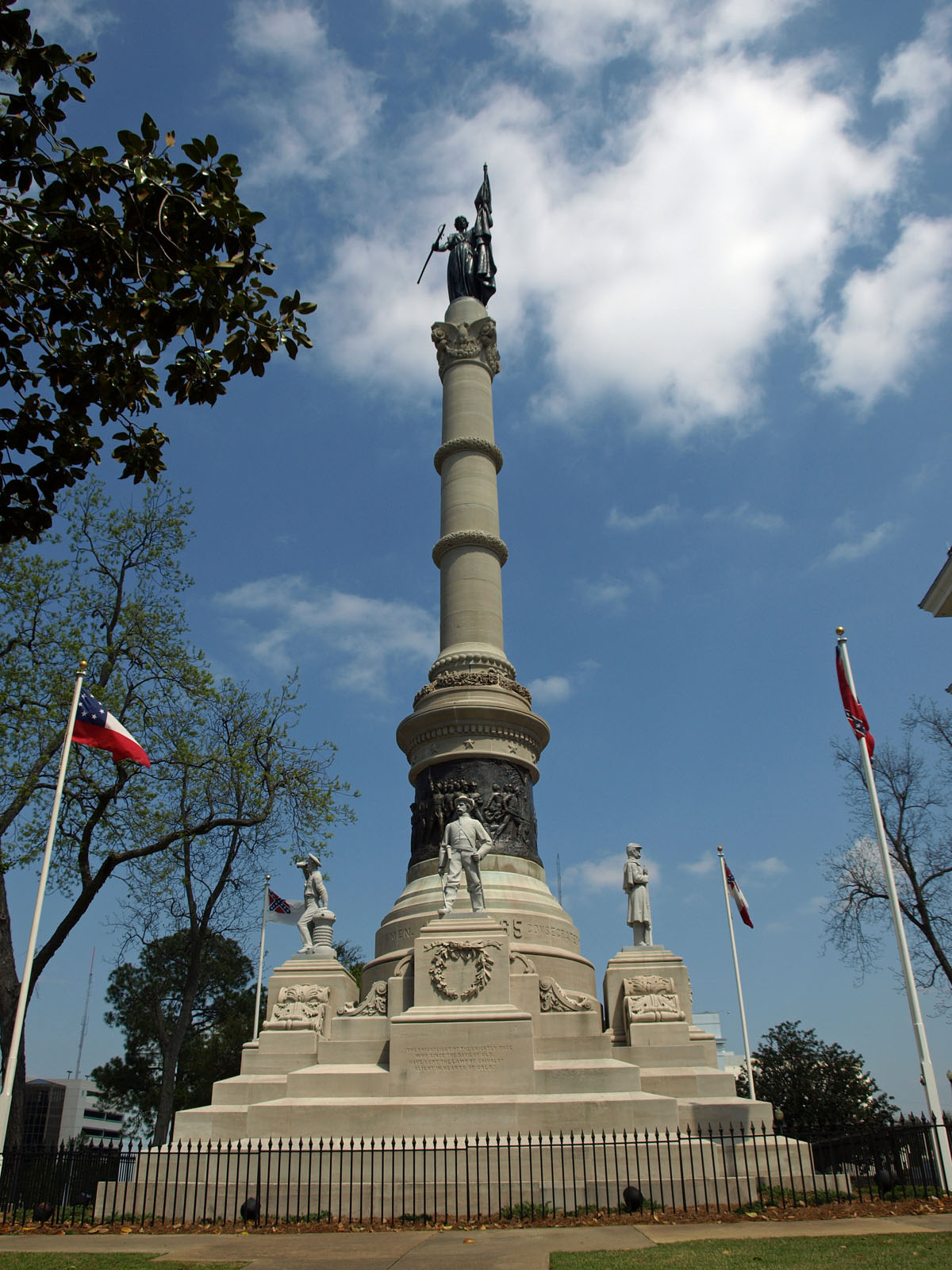
Confederate Memorial Monument in Montgomery, Alabama

In 1868, some Southern public figures began adding the label "Confederate" to their commemorations and claimed that Northerners had appropriated the holiday. The first official celebration of Confederate Memorial Day as a public holiday occurred in 1874, following a proclamation by the Georgia legislature. By 1916, ten states celebrated it, on June 3, the birthday of CSA President Jefferson Davis. Other states chose late April dates, or May 10, commemorating Davis' capture.

The Ladies' Memorial Association played a key role in using Memorial Day rituals to preserve Confederate culture. Various dates ranging from April 25 to mid-June were adopted in different Southern states. Across the South, associations were founded, many by women, to establish and care for permanent cemeteries for the Confederate dead, organize commemorative ceremonies, and sponsor appropriate monuments as a permanent way of remembering the Confederate dead. The most important of these was the United Daughters of the Confederacy, which grew throughout the South. Changes in the ceremony's hymns and speeches reflect an evolution of the ritual into a symbol of cultural renewal and conservatism in the South. By 1913, David Blight argues, the theme of American nationalism shared equal time with the Confederate.

== Renaming ==
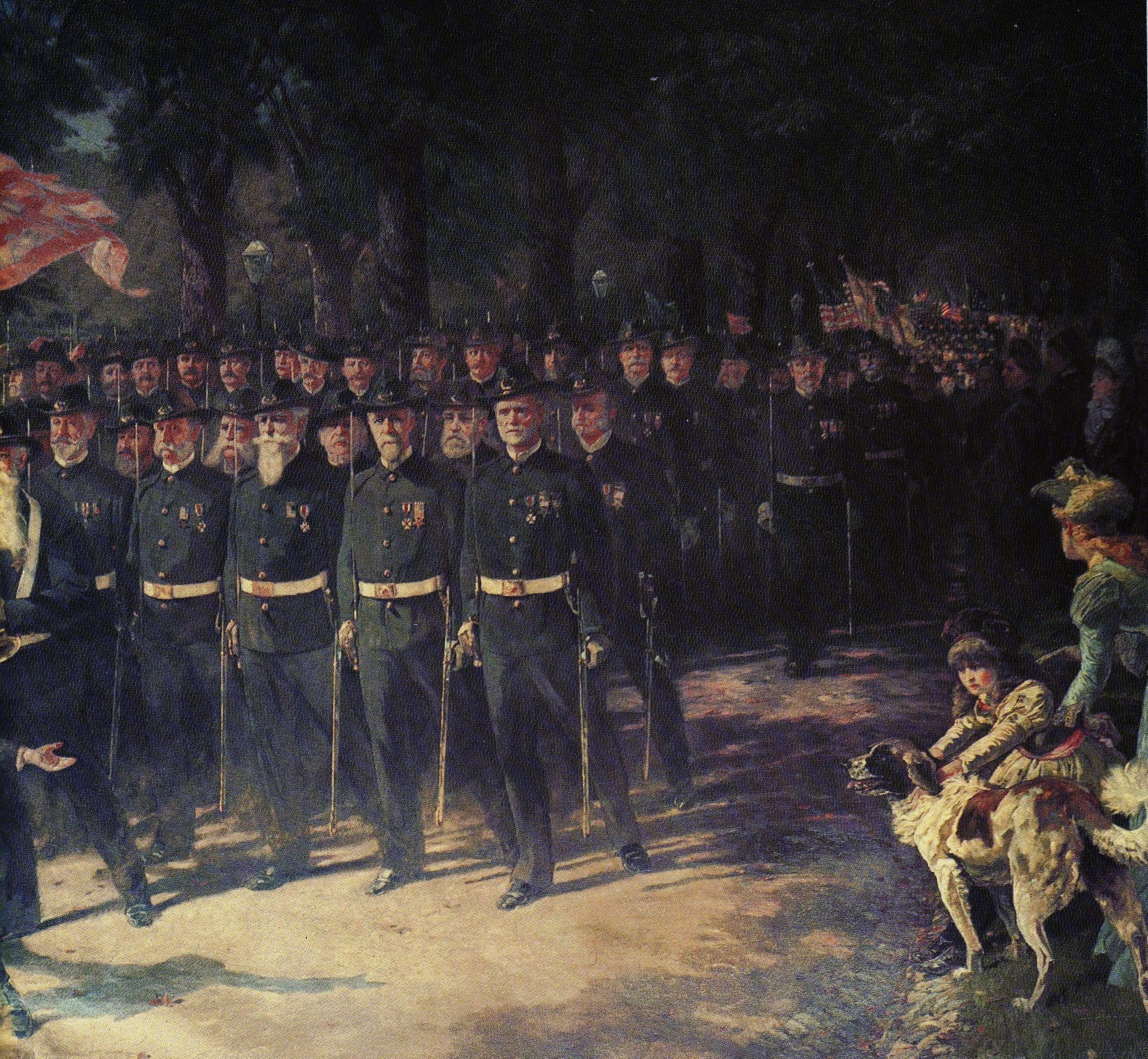
The March of Time, by Henry Sandham depicting Civil War veterans parading during Decoration Day, 1896

By the 20th century, various Union memorial traditions, celebrated on different days, merged, and Memorial Day eventually extended to honor all Americans who fought and died while in the U.S. military service. Indiana from the 1860s to the 1920s saw numerous debates on how to expand the celebration. It was a favorite lobbying activity of the Grand Army of the Republic (GAR). An 1884 GAR handbook explained that Memorial Day was "the day of all days in the G.A.R. Calendar" in terms of mobilizing public support for pensions. It advised family members to "exercise great care" in keeping the veterans sober.

Memorial Day speeches became an occasion for veterans, politicians, and ministers to commemorate the Civil War and, at first, to rehash the "atrocities" of the enemy. They mixed religion and celebratory nationalism, allowing Americans to make sense of their history in terms of sacrifice for a better nation. People of all religious beliefs joined, including German and Irish soldiers – ethnic minorities who at the time faced discrimination – who had become true Americans in the "baptism of blood" on the battlefield.

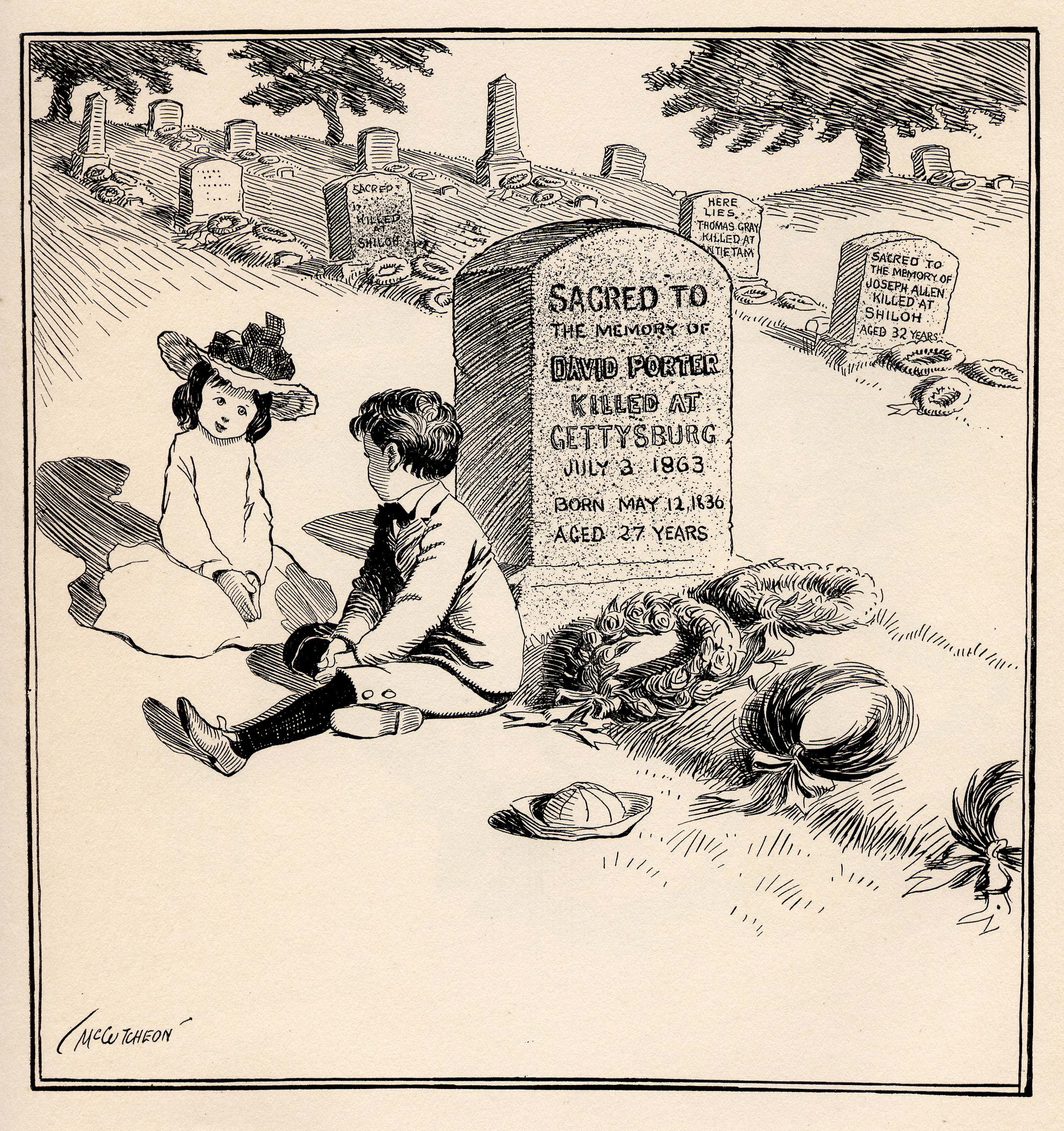
"On Decoration Day" Political cartoon c. 1900 by John T. McCutcheon. Caption: "You bet I'm goin' to be a soldier, too, like my Uncle David, when I grow up."

In the national capital in 1913 the four-day "Blue-Gray Reunion" featured parades, re-enactments, and speeches from a host of dignitaries, including President Woodrow Wilson, the first Southerner elected to the White House since the War. James Heflin of Alabama gave the main address. Heflin was a noted orator; his choice as Memorial Day speaker was criticized, as he was opposed for his support of segregation; however, his speech was moderate in tone and stressed national unity and good will, winning him praise from newspapers.

The name "Memorial Day", which was first used in 1882, gradually became more common than "Decoration Day" after World War II but was not declared the official name by federal law until 1967. On June 28, 1968, Congress passed the Uniform Monday Holiday Act, which moved four holidays, including Memorial Day, from their traditional dates to a specified Monday in order to create a three-day weekend. The change moved Memorial Day from its traditional May 30 date to the last Monday in May. The law took effect at the federal level in 1971.

In 1913, an Indiana veteran complained that younger people born since the war had a "tendency ... to forget the purpose of Memorial Day and make it a day for games, races, and revelry, instead of a day of memory and tears". In 1911, the scheduling of the Indianapolis Motor Speedway car race, later named the Indianapolis 500, was vehemently opposed by the increasingly elderly GAR. The state legislature in 1923 rejected holding the race on the holiday. However, the new American Legion and local officials wanted the race to continue, so Governor Warren McCray vetoed the bill and the race went on.

== Civil religious holiday ==
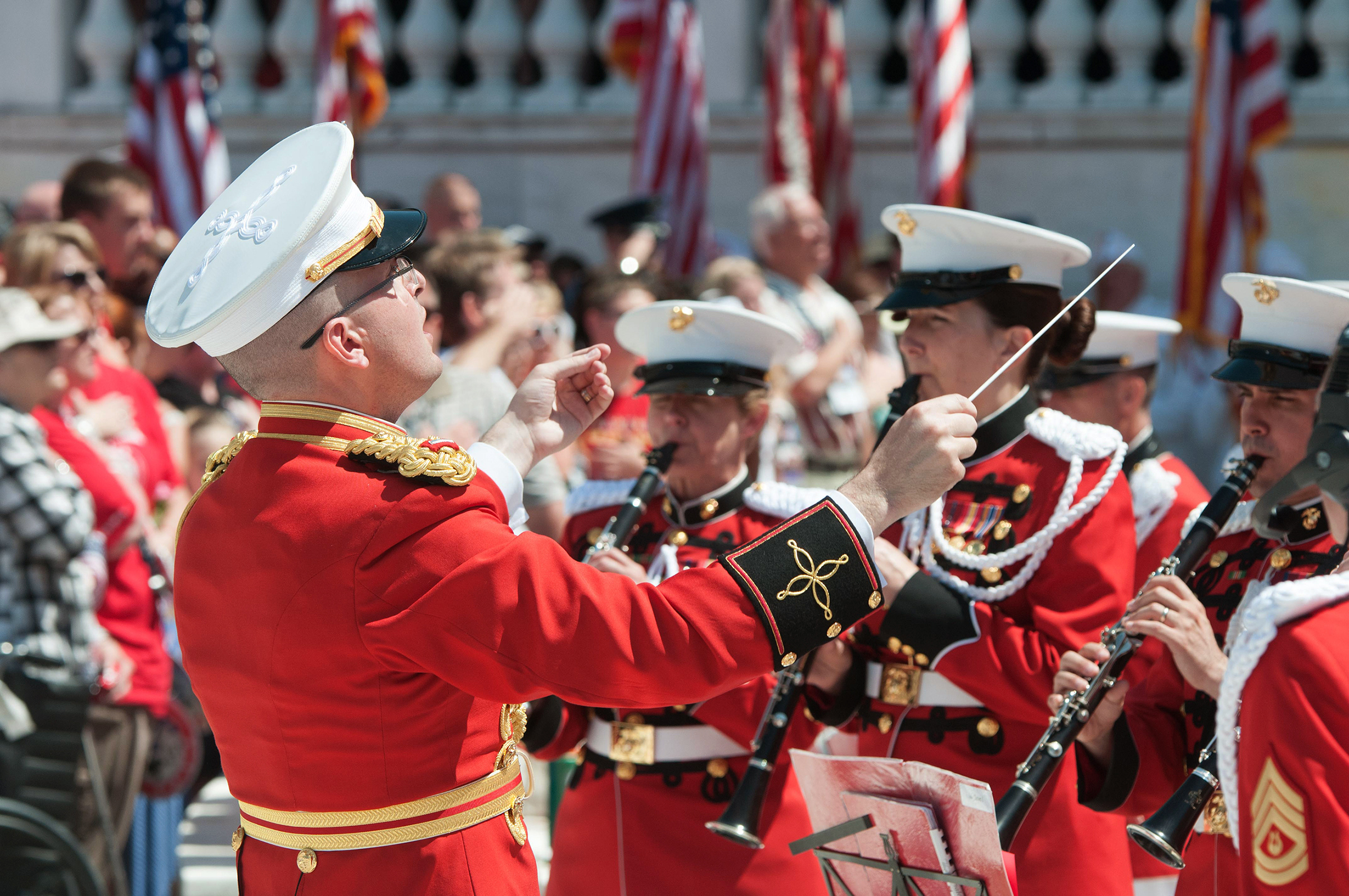
The United States Marine Band on Memorial Day

Memorial Day endures as a holiday which most businesses observe because it marks the unofficial beginning of summer. (Labor Day is the unofficial end of summer.) The Veterans of Foreign Wars (VFW) and Sons of Union Veterans of the Civil War (SUVCW) advocated returning to the original date. The VFW stated in 2002:

In 2000, Congress passed the National Moment of Remembrance Act, asking people to stop and remember at 3:00 pm. On Memorial Day, the flag of the United States is raised briskly to the top of the staff and then solemnly lowered to the half-staff position, where it remains only until noon. It is then raised to full-staff for the remainder of the day. In commemoration ceremonies the Taps are played on the bugle. The National Memorial Day Concert takes place on the west lawn of the United States Capitol.

Scholars, following the lead of sociologist Robert Bellah, often make the argument that the United States has a secular "civil religion"—one with no association with any religious denomination or viewpoint—that has incorporated Memorial Day as a sacred event. With the Civil War, a new theme of death, sacrifice, and rebirth enters the civil religion. Memorial Day gave ritual expression to these themes, integrating the local community into a sense of nationalism. The American civil religion, in contrast to that of France, was never anticlerical or militantly secular; in contrast to Britain, it was not tied to a specific denomination, such as the Church of England. The Americans borrowed from different religious traditions so that the average American saw no conflict between the two, and deep levels of personal motivation were aligned with attaining national goals.

== Parades ==
Since 1867, Brooklyn, New York, has held an annual Memorial Day parade which it claims to be the nation's oldest. Grafton, West Virginia (West Virginia Memorial Day Parade), and Ironton, Ohio, have also had an ongoing parade since 1868. The Memorial Day parade in Rochester, Wisconsin, predates the Doylestown, Pennsylvania, Grafton and Ironton parades by one year (1867).

== Poppies ==
In 1915, following the Second Battle of Ypres, Lieutenant Colonel John McCrae, a physician with the Canadian Expeditionary Force, wrote the poem "In Flanders Fields". Its opening lines refer to the fields of poppies that grew among the soldiers' graves in Flanders. Inspired by the poem, YWCA worker Moina Michael attended a YWCA Overseas War Secretaries' conference three years later wearing a silk poppy pinned to her coat and distributed over two dozen more to others present. The National American Legion adopted the poppy as its official symbol of remembrance in 1920.

== Observance dates (1971–2037) ==
Year												Memorial Day
1971	1976	1982		1993	1999	2004	2010		2021	2027	2032	May 31 (week 22)
	1977	1983	1988	1994		2005	2011	2016	2022		2033	May 30 (week 22)
1972	1978		1989	1995	2000	2006		2017	2023	2028	2034	May 29 (week 22)
1973	1979	1984	1990		2001	2007	2012	2018		2029	2035	May 28 (week 22)
1974		1985	1991	1996	2002		2013	2019	2024	2030		May 27 (common year week 21, leap year week 22)
1975	1980	1986		1997	2003	2008	2014		2025	2031	2036	May 26 (week 21)
	1981	1987	1992	1998		2009	2015	2020	2026		2037	May 25 (week 21)

== Related traditions ==
Decoration Days in Southern Appalachia and Liberia are a tradition which arose by the 19th century. Decoration practices are localized and unique to individual families, cemeteries, and communities, but common elements that unify the various Decoration Day practices are thought to represent syncretism of predominantly Christian cultures in 19th-century Southern Appalachia with pre-Christian influences from Scotland, Ireland, and African cultures. Appalachian and Liberian cemetery decoration traditions are thought to have more in common with one another than with United States Memorial Day traditions which are focused on honoring the military dead. Appalachian and Liberian cemetery decoration traditions pre-date the United States Memorial Day holiday.

According to scholars Alan and Karen Jabbour, "the geographic spread ... from the Smokies to northeastern Texas and Liberia, offer strong evidence that the southern Decoration Day originated well back in the nineteenth century. The presence of the same cultural tradition throughout the Upland South argues for the age of the tradition, which was carried westward (and eastward to Africa) by nineteenth-century migration and has survived in essentially the same form till the present."

While these customs may have inspired in part rituals to honor military dead like Memorial Day, numerous differences exist between Decoration Day customs and Memorial Day, including that the date is set differently by each family or church for each cemetery to coordinate the maintenance, social, and spiritual aspects of decoration.

== In popular culture ==
=== Films ===
- In Memorial Day, a 2012 war film starring James Cromwell, Jonathan Bennett, and John Cromwell, a character recalls and relives memories of World War II.

=== Music ===
- American composer Charles Ives titled the second movement of his A Symphony: New England Holidays, "Decoration Day".

=== Poetry ===
Poems commemorating Memorial Day include:

- Francis M. Finch's "The Blue and the Gray" (1867)
- Henry Wadsworth Longfellow's "Decoration Day" (1882)
- Michael Anania's "Memorial Day" (1994)

== See also ==
=== United States ===
- A Great Jubilee Day, first held the last Monday in May 1783 (American Revolutionary War)
- Armed Forces Day, third Saturday in May, a more narrowly observed remembrance honoring those currently serving in the U.S. military
- Armistice Day, November 11, the original name of Veterans Day in the United States
- Confederate Memorial Day, observed on various dates in many states in the South in memory of those killed fighting for the Confederacy during the American Civil War
- Memorial Day massacre of 1937, May 30, held to remember demonstrators shot by police in Chicago
- Nora Fontaine Davidson, credited with the first Memorial Day ceremony in Petersburg, Virginia
- Patriot Day, September 11, in memory of people killed in the September 11 attacks
- Remembrance Day at the Gettysburg Battlefield, an annual honoring of Civil War dead held near the anniversary of the Gettysburg Address
- United States military casualties of war
- Veterans Day, November 11, honoring American military veterans, both alive and deceased

=== Other countries ===
- ANZAC Day, April 25, an analogous observance in Australia and New Zealand
- Armistice Day, November 11, the original name of Veterans Day in the United States and Remembrance Day in Canada, the United Kingdom, and other Commonwealth nations
- Commemoration Day of Fallen Soldiers ("Kaatuneitten muistopäivä"), a day observed in Finland on the third Sunday of May for the soldiers killed in the Finnish Civil War and World War II
- Decoration Day (Canada), a Canadian holiday that recognizes veterans of Canada's military which has largely been eclipsed by the similar Remembrance Day
- Heroes' Day, various dates in various countries recognizing national heroes
- International Day of United Nations Peacekeepers, May 29, international observance recognizing United Nations peacekeepers
- Memorial Day (South Korea), June 6, the day to commemorate the men and women who died while in military service during the Korean War and other significant wars or battles
- Remembrance Day, November 11, a similar observance in Canada, the United Kingdom, and many other Commonwealth nations originally marking the end of World War I
- Remembrance of the Dead ("Dodenherdenking"), May 4, a similar observance in the Netherlands
- Victoria Day, a Canadian holiday on the last Monday before May 25 each year, lacks the military memorial aspects of Memorial Day but serves a similar function as marking the start of cultural summer
- Volkstrauertag ("People's Mourning Day"), a similar observance in Germany usually in November
- Yom Hazikaron (Israeli memorial day), the day before Independence Day (Israel), around Iyar 4
