= Confederate Memorial Day =

Observance in some Southern U.S. states

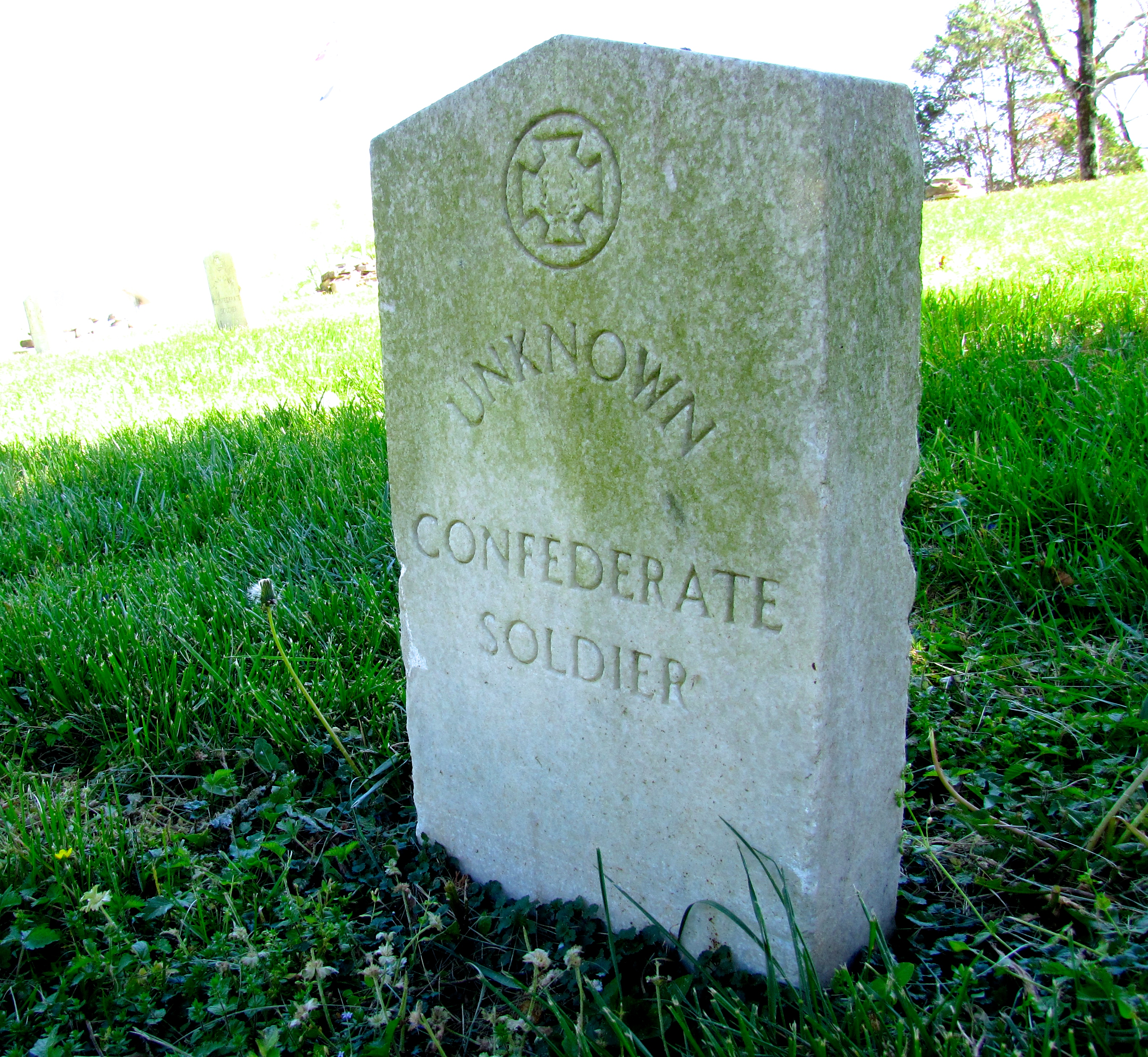
- Standard government headstone for unknown Confederate soldier, Beechgrove, Tennessee
- Also called: Confederate Heroes Day, Confederate Decoration Day
- Observed by: Southern states (United States)
- Type: Cultural
- Observances: Remembrance of Confederate soldiers who died during the American Civil War
- Date: January 19 (TX); Fourth Monday in April (AL, FL); Last Monday in April (MS); May 10 (NC, SC); June 3 (KY, TN)
- Frequency: Annual
- First time: April 26, 1866 (160 years ago)
- Related to: Lee–Jackson Day (celebration ceased from July 2020 by State House's bill); Robert E. Lee Day

Confederate Memorial Day (called Confederate Heroes Day in Texas and Florida, and Confederate Decoration Day in Tennessee) is a holiday observed in several Southern U.S. states on various dates since the end of the American Civil War. The holiday was originally publicly presented as a day to remember the estimated 258,000 Confederate soldiers who died during the American Civil War.

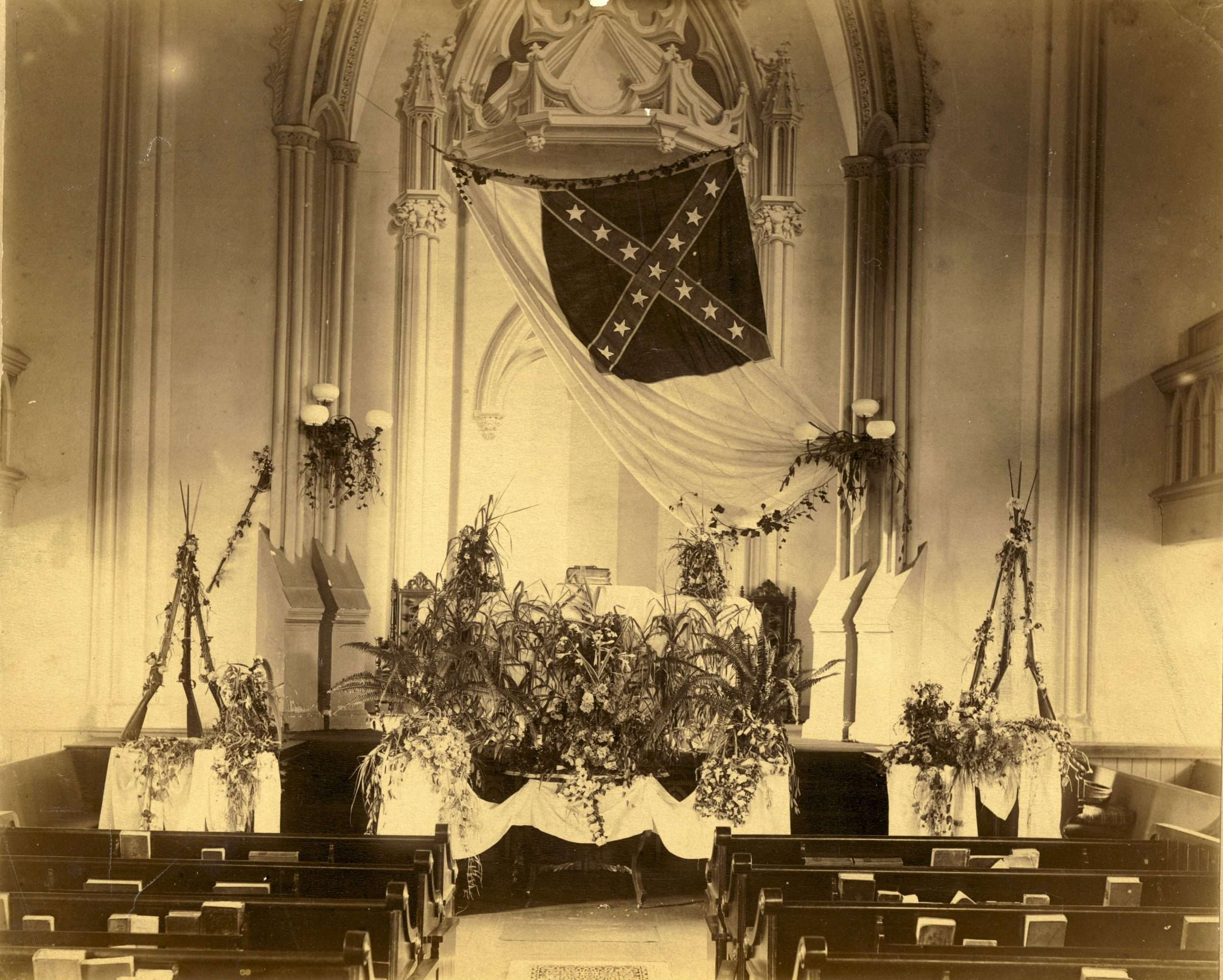
Interior of an unidentified church, festooned with fabric and flowers, garland-bedecked bayonet rifles standing as tripods on either side of the altar, and a large Confederate flag at center.

The holiday originated at a local level by Ladies' Memorial Associations to care for the graves of Confederate dead. In 1866, General John A. Logan commanded the posts of Grand Army of the Republic to strew flowers on the graves of Union soldiers, which observance later became the national Memorial Day. In a speech to veterans in Salem, Illinois, on July 4, 1866, Logan referred to the various dates of observance adopted in the South for the practice, saying "…traitors in the South have their gatherings day after day, to strew garlands of flowers upon the graves of Rebel soldiers..."

The Southern Poverty Law Center has condemned the holiday as part of a campaign of "racial terror" on the part of white supremacists — "an organized propaganda campaign, created to instill fear and ensure the ongoing oppression of formerly enslaved people." Writers and historians have pointed out that the holiday's official recognition by states often coincided with the height of Jim Crow racism around the United States, decades after the war ended. Renewed interest also revived the holiday in some places during the beginning of the civil rights movement in the 1950s.

It is currently an official state holiday in Alabama, Mississippi, South Carolina and Texas (where state employees are entitled to a paid day off work), while it is commemorated in Kentucky, Florida, North Carolina, and Tennessee. It was also formerly recognized in Missouri, Louisiana, and Virginia.

== Origins ==
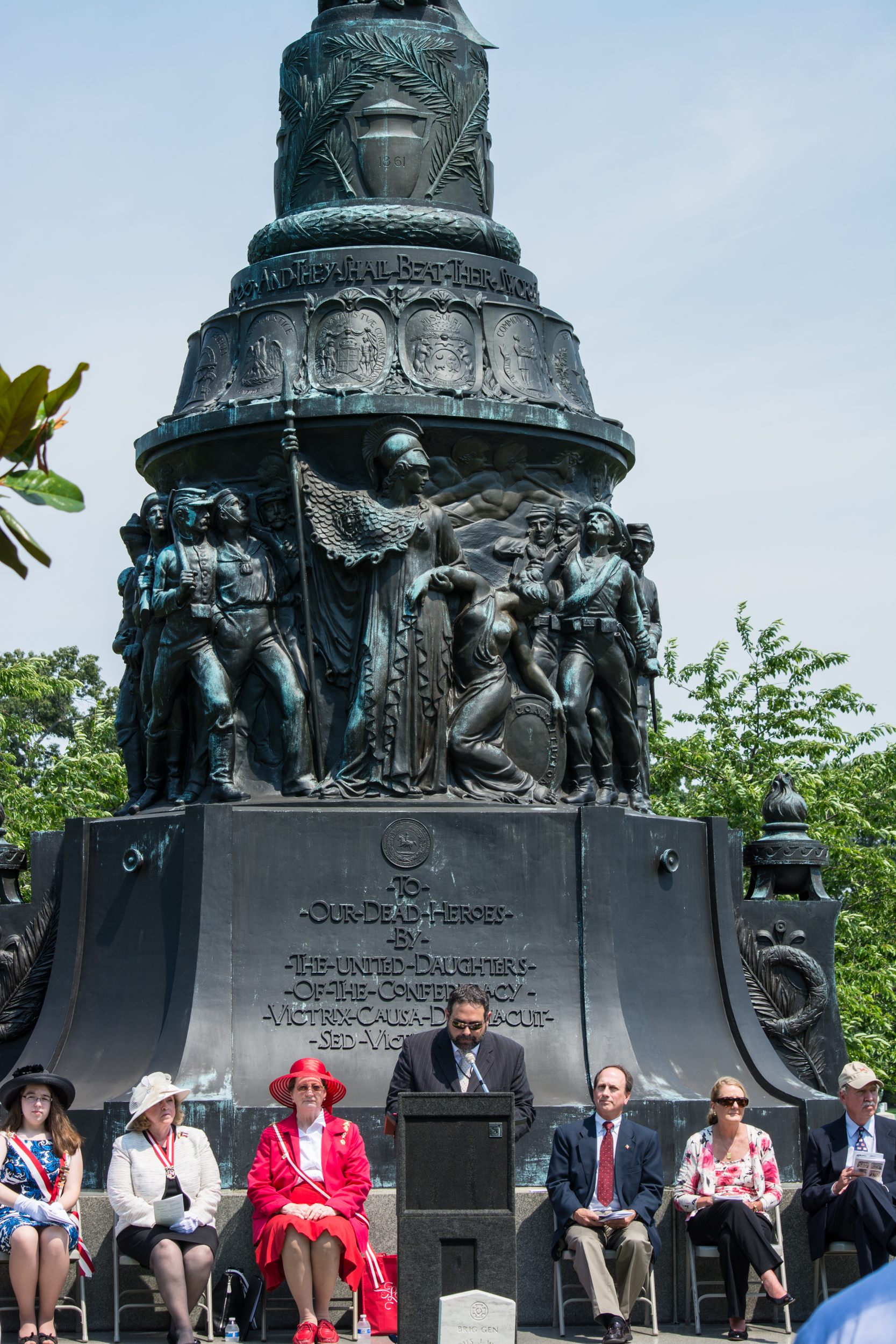
Confederate Memorial Day observance in front of the Monument to Confederate Dead, Arlington National Cemetery, on June 8, 2014

According to Charles Reagan Wilson, the legendary origin of Confederate Memorial Day was an appeal made in 1866 to Southerners to set aside a day every year "to be handed down through time as a religious custom of the South to wreathe the graves of our martyred dead with flowers". The appeal was made by Mary Ann Williams, a Confederate widow who was a member of the Ladies Memorial Association of Columbus, Georgia. Southerners could not easily agree on a date. April 26 was picked by Lizzie Rutherford of the Columbus LMA; on April 26, 1865, Confederate General Joseph E. Johnston surrendered to Union Major General William Tecumseh Sherman, and for many that date marked the end of the Civil War.

The first official celebration as a public holiday occurred in 1874, following a proclamation by the Georgia legislature. By 1916, ten states celebrated it, on June 3, the birthday of CSA President Jefferson Davis. Other states chose late April dates, or May 10, commemorating Davis' capture.

Historians have pointed out that the holiday's official recognition by states often coincided with the height of Jim Crow racism around the United States. In some places, the holiday attracted revived interest as a reaction to the early civil rights movement in the 1950s.

== Connection to Memorial Day ==
In their book, The Genesis of the Memorial Day Holiday in America, Bellware and Gardiner assert that the national Memorial Day holiday is a direct offshoot of the observance begun by the Ladies Memorial Association of Columbus, Georgia in 1866. In a few places, most notably Columbus, Mississippi and Macon, Georgia, both Confederate and Union graves were decorated during the first observance. The day was even referred to as Memorial Day by The Baltimore Sun on May 8, 1866, after the ladies organization that started it. The name Confederate Memorial Day was not used until the Northern observance was initiated in 1868.

While initially cool to the idea of a Northern version of the holiday, General John A. Logan was eventually won over. His General Order No. 11, issued May 5, 1868, commanded the posts of Grand Army of the Republic to strew flowers on the graves of Union soldiers. The Grand Army of the Republic eventually adopted the name Memorial Day at their national encampment in 1882.

Many theories have been offered as to how Logan became aware of the former Confederate tradition he imitated in 1868. In her autobiography, his wife Mary Logan claims she told him about it after a trip to Virginia in the spring of that year. His secretary and his adjutant also claim they told him about it. John Murray of Waterloo, New York, claims it was he who inspired Logan in 1868. Bellware and Gardiner, however, offer proof that Logan was aware of the Southern tributes long before any of them had a chance to mention it to him. In a speech to veterans in Salem, Illinois, on July 4, 1866, Logan referred to the various dates of observance adopted in the South for the practice saying "…traitors in the South have their gatherings day after day, to strew garlands of flowers upon the graves of Rebel soldiers..."

== Statutory holidays ==
Confederate Memorial Day is a statutory holiday in Alabama on the fourth Monday in April, in Mississippi on the final Monday in April, and in South Carolina on May 10. In all of these states, state offices are closed on this day (in Texas a so-called "skeleton crew" is required however staff are later compensated for their work on the holiday.

In Georgia, the fourth Monday in April was formerly celebrated as Confederate Memorial Day, but beginning in 2016, in response to the Charleston church shooting, the names of Confederate Memorial Day and Robert E. Lee's Birthday were struck from the state calendar and the statutory holidays were designated simply as "state holidays". Beginning in 2020, state offices in Georgia now observe Confederate Memorial Day on Good Friday, though it is still referred to as "State Holiday." Florida also continues to officially designate Confederate Memorial Day on the fourth Monday in April, although state offices remain open.

North Carolina also designates the holiday on May 10, although state offices remain open and localities may choose whether to observe it.

In June 2022, the Louisiana State Legislature voted to remove Confederate Memorial Day, as well as Robert E. Lee Day, from the state's calendar of official holidays.

State	Recognized	Derecognized	Type	Date
Alabama	1901	-	State holiday	Last Monday in April
Florida	1895	-	Commemoration	Fourth Monday in April
Georgia	1874	2016	4th Monday in April (2016-2019) or Good Friday (2020-present) now called "State Holiday"	Fourth Monday in April or Good Friday
Kentucky	?	-	Commemoration	
Louisiana	c. 1925	2022	State holiday	April 26
Mississippi	?	-	State holiday	Last Monday in April
Missouri	?	?		
North Carolina	?	-	Commemoration	May 10
South Carolina	1896	-	State holiday (made non-optional in 2000)	May 10
Tennessee	1903	-	Annual proclamation required by law	June 3
Texas	1973	-	State Holiday (with skeletal crew workers later compensated)	January 19
Virginia	1899	2020		

=== Related holidays ===
==== Tennessee ====
In Tennessee, the governor is required by law to proclaim Confederate Decoration Day each June 3.

==== Texas ====
In Texas, state offices remain open on this day but employees may have an optional, paid day off with state offices working a skeleton crew.

In 1931, the Texas Legislature made Robert E. Lee's birthday (January 19) a state holiday.

In 1973, the Texas House had massive turnover, with 71 incoming freshman and 8 new Black representatives, which was the most in the House since the Reconstruction era. One of the new Black legislators, Senfronia Thompson, filed a bill to make January 15 a state holiday for Martin Luther King Jr., as an "honorary" state holiday that would not have any state offices or banks close in observance. The bill did not get a vote, but they did make other changes to the state holidays: the Texas Legislature removed Jefferson Davis' and Robert E. Lee's birthdays as state holidays, and replaced them with Confederate Heroes Day, to be celebrated on January 19.

In 1987, Martin Luther King Jr. Day was added as a federal holiday for the third Monday in January, and in that year the Texas Legislature made it an optional state holiday, and in 1991 they made MLK Day an official state holiday. In some years (1987, 1998, 2004, 2009, 2015, 2026) MLK Jr. Day and Confederate Heroes Day fall on the same day.

Texas state Representatives and Senators have tried to amend or abolish Confederate Heroes Day from the state calendar:

- 2015: State Representative Donna Howard filed a bill to rename the holiday Civil War Remembrance Day; it did not get out of the committee for a vote
- 2019: State Representative Jarvis Johnson filed a bill to end the state holiday. It did not get out of committee.
- 2021: State Representatives Jarvis Johnson and Shawn Thierry filed bills to abolish the holiday, and state Senator Nathan M. Johnson filed a bill to replace the holiday with one in June celebrating suffrage for all Americans; these did not get out of committee.
- 2023: State Representative Jarvis Johnson again filed a bill to remove the holiday and state Senator Nathan Johnson sponsored legislation in the Senate; they did not get out of committee.

== Controversy ==
The holiday has been condemned by the Southern Poverty Law Center as part of a campaign of "racial terror" on the part of white supremacists, "an organized propaganda campaign, created to instill fear and ensure the ongoing oppression of formerly enslaved people". Critics often cite the fact that the Confederacy was formed for the purpose of protecting slavery. Some commemorations have been met with groups of protesters.

Various proposals have been made in the legislatures of the states still recognizing it to remove it from the list of state holidays or commemorations, or to replace it with Juneteenth.

The campaign for de-recognition of the holiday overlaps with that for removal of Confederate monuments and memorials, and is often highlighted after incidents of racial violence, such as the Charleston church shooting, the 2017 Charlottesville car attack.

== See also ==
- Commemoration of the American Civil War
- List of Confederate monuments and memorials
- Lost Cause of the Confederacy
