= Ladies' Memorial Association =

Women's organization in the American South

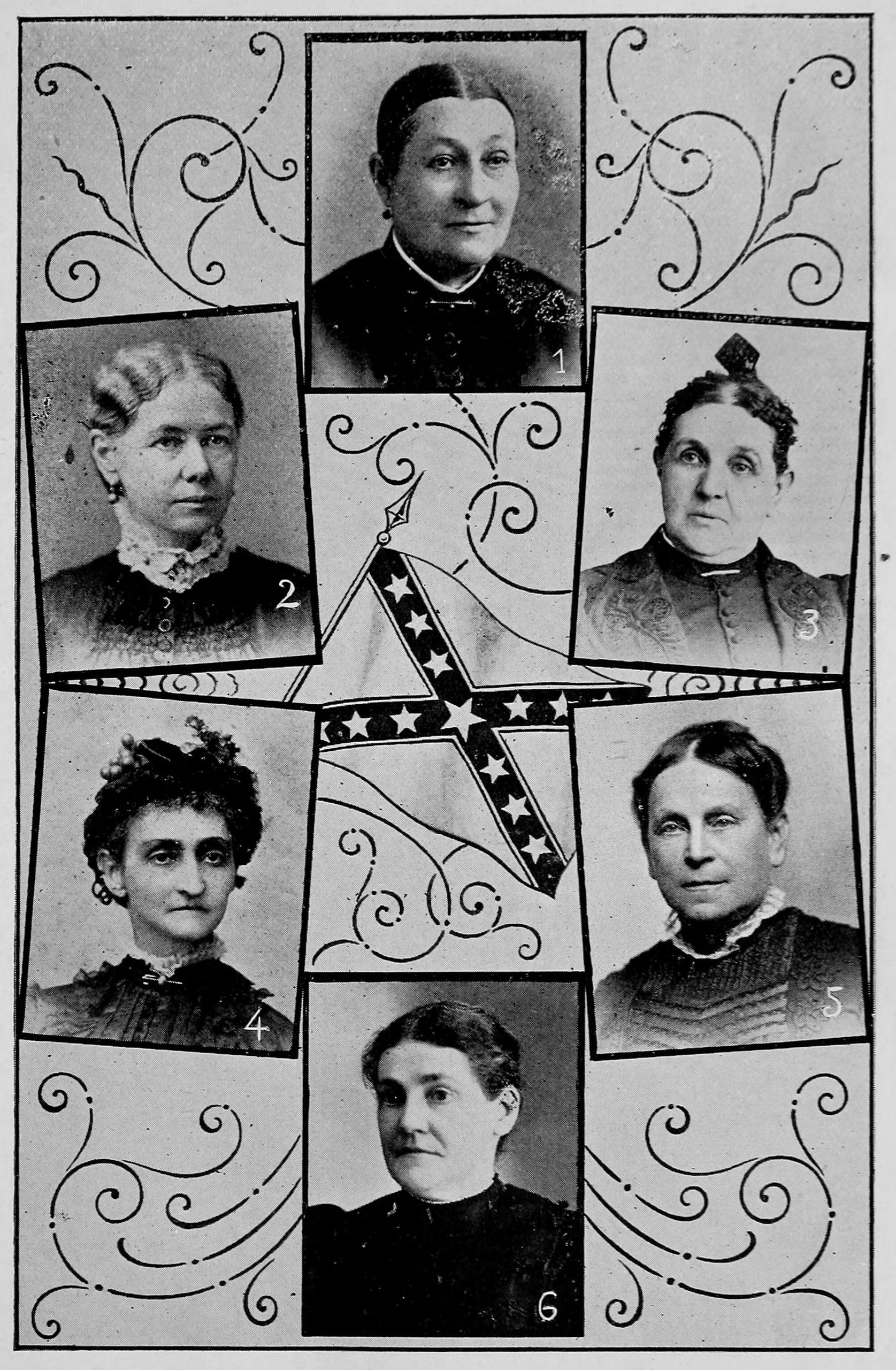
Presidents of local LMAs from Alabama, Georgia, and South Carolina

A Ladies' Memorial Association (LMA) is a type of organization for women that sprang up all over the American South in the years after the American Civil War. Typically, these were organizations by and for women, whose goal was to raise monuments in Confederate soldiers honor. Their immediate goal, of providing decent burial for soldiers, was joined with the desire to commemorate the sacrifices of Southerners and to propagate the Lost Cause of the Confederacy. Between 1865 and 1900, these associations were a formidable force in Southern culture, establishing cemeteries and raising large monuments often in very conspicuous places, and helped unite white Southerners in an ideology at once therapeutic and political.

== History ==
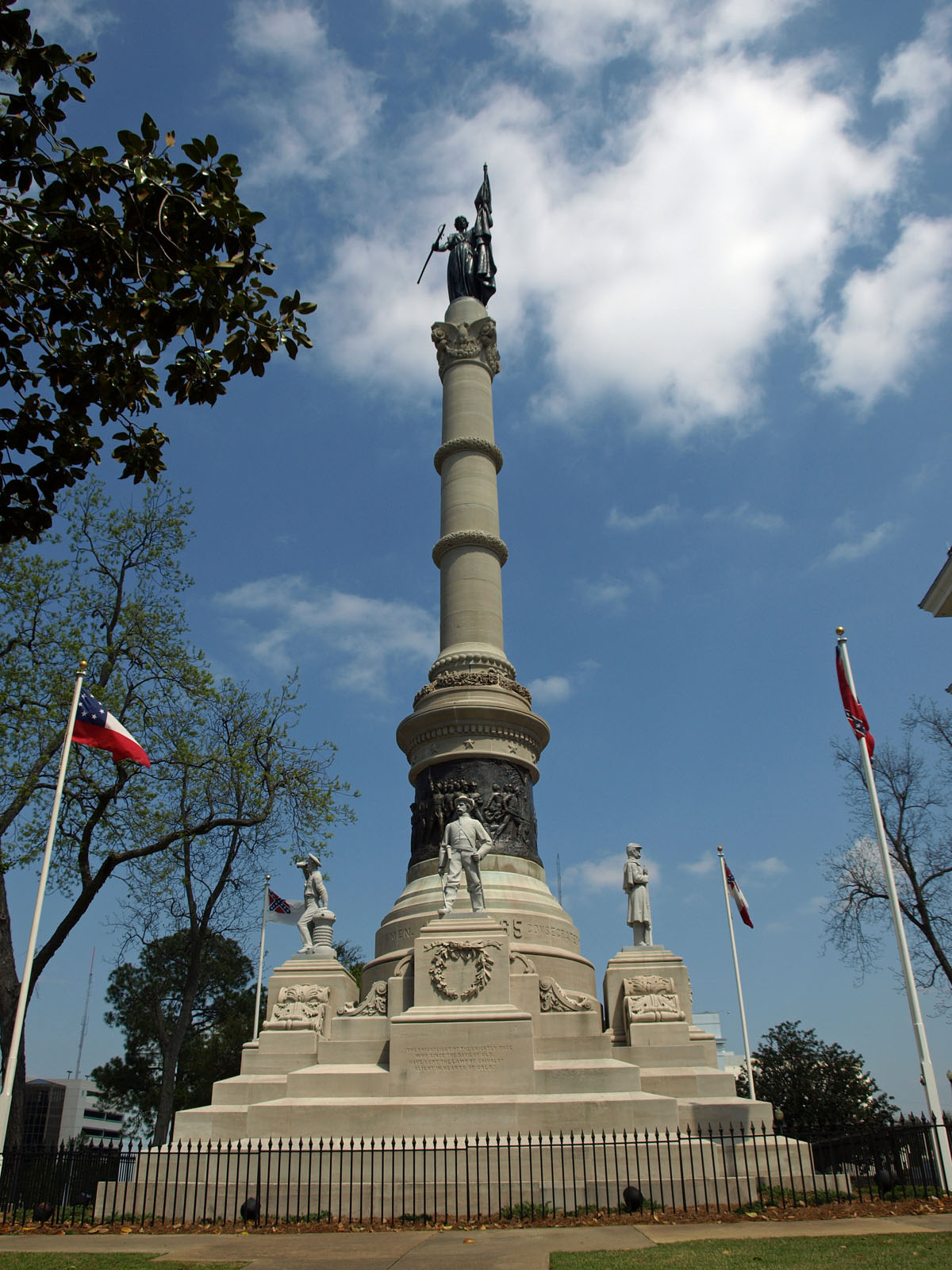
Confederate Memorial Monument in Montgomery, Alabama

=== Origins ===
The first Ladies' Memorial Association (LMA) sprang up immediately after the end of the Civil War in Winchester, Virginia, which had suffered significantly during the war. Mary Dunbar Williams of Winchester organized a group of women to give proper burial to Confederate dead whose bodies were found in the countryside, and to decorate those graves annually. In the summer of 1865, the Winchester women appealed in newspapers for financial aid and soon money began pouring in for the Winchester cemetery. Alabamians, following an appeal by a Montgomery newspaper, were significant contributors, and Stonewall Cemetery, Winchester, (named for Stonewall Jackson) was opened in 1866. Within a year, according to Caroline Janney, seventy such organizations had been founded throughout the South. Another early cemetery was established by the LMA of Wake County, North Carolina. The history of the Montgomery LMA indicates that these organizations were part of a broader movement: it built on the work of individuals and "Ladies Aid Organizations" done during the war, and was given extra impetus by the formation (by gentlemen of the city) of a historical society (toward the end of 1865) and the news from other states (Mississippi) and cities (Selma) of the formation of women's associations in early 1866. After an emotional plea in the paper, "the women of Montgomery, in answer to this call, filled the sacred halls of the old Court Street Methodist Church on that beautiful Monday morning on the sixteenth day of April, eighteen-hundred and sixty-six!"

In Kentucky, the Cynthiana Confederate Monument Association raised the funds for designing and installing the Confederate Monument in Cynthiana in 1869. It was the first Confederate monument of over sixty American Civil War monuments in Kentucky.

In Montgomery, the LMA raised $10,000 for the Confederate Memorial Monument on the grounds of the Alabama State Capitol, designed by Alexander Doyle and erected in 1898. Monuments built by LMAs (on cemeteries) often included sculptures symbolizing Johnny Reb, such as in Petersburg, Virginia: "the statue of the soldier is of bronze, a Confederate soldier, six foot high, 'accountred as a private of infantry, a full cartridge box, lightly filled haversack, rolled blanket, canteen and old slouch hat' that in the days gone by waved the measure of the yell of 'Johnny Reb.'--the fiercest war-cry that ever smote a foeman's ear."

In Athens, Georgia, Laura Rutherford had headed a soldier's aid society. After the end of the Civil War, she converted that into a chapter of the LMA. When she died in 1888, her daughter, Mildred Lewis Rutherford became president for life of the chapter.

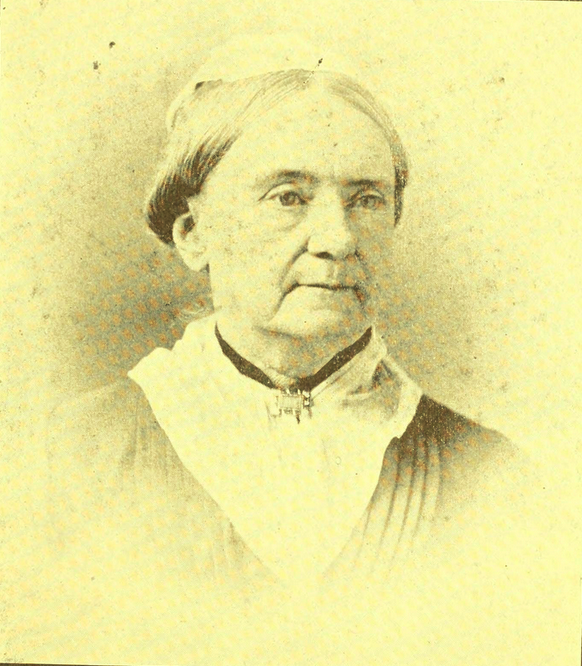
Evelyn Carter

In early 1866, the Soldiers' Aid Society of Columbus, Ga. reorganized themselves into the Ladies Memorial Association of Columbus. They elected Evelyn Carter as president; Margaret Ware, first Vice President; Mrs J. A. McAllister, second Vice President; Martha Patten, Treasurer and Mary Ann Williams as corresponding secretary. Mrs. Williams wrote a letter urging Southern women to come together on April 26, 1866, to decorate the graves of Confederate soldiers with flowers. The letter was printed in newspapers across the south. In The Genesis of the Memorial Day Holiday in America, Bellware and Gardiner showed just how widely the letter was published. The ladies responded and the Memorial Day holiday in the United States was inaugurated. It takes its name from the Ladies Memorial Associations that organized the observances. Two years later, on May 5, 1868, John A. Logan, Commander-in-Chief of the Grand Army of the Republic (GAR), commanded all posts across the country to decorate Union graves with flowers on May 30. Thereafter, the April holiday became known as Confederate Memorial Day. The May 30 holiday was commonly known as both Decoration Day and Memorial Day. The GAR officially adopted the name Memorial Day at their 1882 encampment.

=== Growth ===
Because they were women's organizations, and since women were generally considered to be non-political beings, Southerners soon saw the benefit of these organizations, which were able to propagate the Lost Cause of the Confederacy without being treasonous to the US government. Women in the LMAs, according to Janney, "expand[ed] on two trends that had developed during the war: the creation of an organized womanhood among southern white women and a sense of white southern solidarity among ex-Confederates." LMAs, along with other women's organizations, also aided in the care for and repatriation of Confederate veterans. The movement for which they provided the first impetus is referred to as the "Confederate Memorial movement".

The popularity of these organizations was helped by what was perceived as a lack of respect on the US government's part for Southern dead. Starting in 1866, scouts were sent out from the North to retrieve Union soldiers' bodies for burial in United States National Cemetery, from which Confederate soldiers were excluded. Other cities soon followed Winchester's example and many chapters are still active, such as in Montgomery (founded 1866) and Fredericksburg, Virginia (1870).

In May 1900, the different memorial associations of all the Southern states had their first national meeting, in Louisville, Kentucky, where officers for a national organization were chosen. Their historian, Margaret Cary Green Davis, outlined the goals of the association thusly:

To future generations of the people of the South and to the sons and daughters of the women of the Confederacy, who first banded themselves together in memorial work, may this Confederation carry its messages and legacy of devotion to the memory of a Cause and the heroes who fought for it, the Deathless Dead of the Southern Confederacy.

== Cultural importance ==
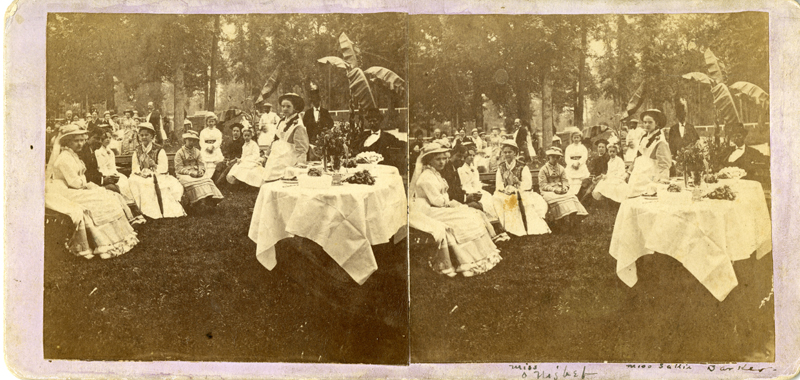
A Ladies Memorial Association festival in Central City Park, Macon, Georgia c. 1877

While LMAs provided an opportunity for Southern white women to express their dedication to the Lost Cause and at the same time allowed those women to organize in ways did not threaten the male establishment, they also helped resurrect Southern masculinity, according to LeeAnn Whites: the men who had been forced to give up the traditional Southern male prerogatives of "slaveownership and regional dominance" could now "reconstruct" and "valorize themselves by honoring the greater sacrifice of the Confederate Dead." Thus, their function was therapeutic in respect to the psychological trauma suffered as a result of the Confederacy's loss; at the same time, while "ostensibly apolitical", they acted on public policy by "advancing and refining the Confederate tradition and reinforcing the political and social hierarchy they believed in. ... these women accomplished what their overtly political men could not. Remaining above the political fray yet skillfully navigating difficult political situations, they repeatedly gained state support in establishing their version of history as the official public memory." The promotion of public commemoration and the establishment of a Confederate memory by organizations such as the LMAs took place in a world in which the now-public presence of African Americans caused great anxiety, suggesting, according to some scholars, a "more purposeful strategy of racism". While much credit is usually given to the United Daughters of the Confederacy (UDC) for "transform[ing] military defeat into a political and cultural victory, where states' rights and white supremacy remained intact", authors such as Janney have argued that LMAs did so long before the UDC was founded in 1894.

== See also ==
- Confederate Monument
