= Mary Ann Williams =

American proponent of Memorial Day (1821-1874

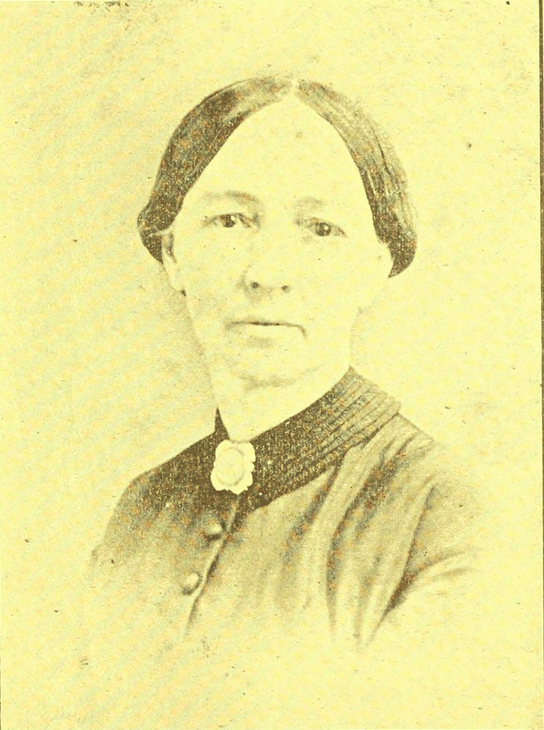
- from History of Confederated Memorial Associations of the South, 1904
- Born: August 10, 1821; Baldwin, Co., Georgia
- Died: April 15, 1874 (aged 52); Columbus, Georgia
- Spouse: Charles J. Williams

Mary Ann Williams (also known as Mrs. Charles J. Williams) (10 August 1821 – 15 April 1874) was an American woman who was the first proponent for Memorial Day, an annual holiday to decorate graves of soldiers.

== Biography ==
=== Antebellum years ===
Mary Ann Howard was born in Baldwin County, Georgia. She was the daughter of Major Jack Howard. She married Charles J. Williams in 1847 when he returned from the Mexican–American War. Mary Ann had presented his regiment with a flag made by the ladies of the city when they left in 1846. According to the 1860 census of Columbus, Georgia, they had four children Charles Howard, Caroline, Mary, and Lila. Charles pursued his career as a lawyer and Mary Ann supported a number of civic projects. Charles entered politics and represented Muscogee County in the Georgia House in 1859-1860 where he rose to be speaker of the Georgia House prior to the Civil War.

=== Civil War years ===
Charles left Columbus to command Fort Pulaski on the Georgia coast but gave up that command in order to lead troops in Virginia. Mary Ann joined the Soldiers Aid Society to support the local soldiers in the war effort. He returned to Columbus in February 1862 in very ill health. He died within a few days and was buried in the City Cemetery, now known as Linwood. Mary Ann continued her activities in the Soldiers’ Aid Society and inaugurated the Soldiers’ Home in Columbus. She was said to have visited her husband's grave frequently and was inspired by her young daughter who wanted to decorate the other soldiers’ graves with flowers as well.

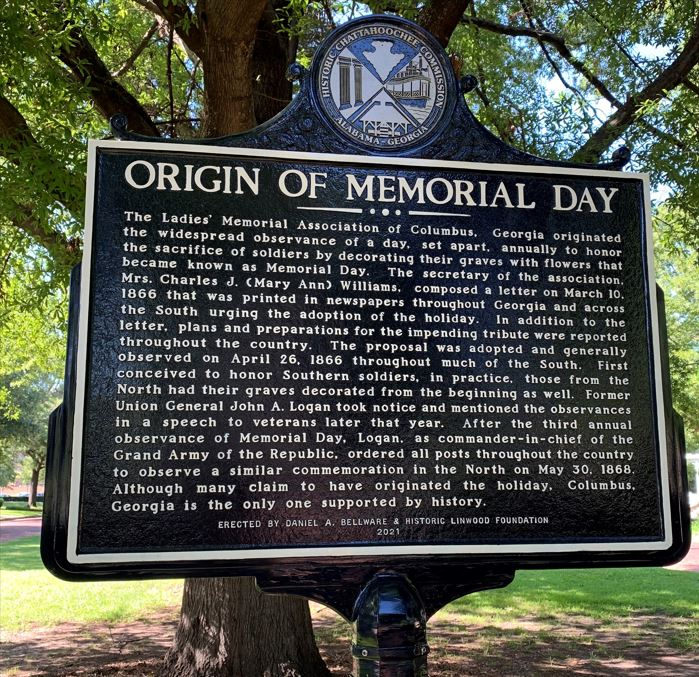
Marker on Broadway in Columbus, GA that explains the roles of Mrs. Williams and General Logan in starting the holiday.

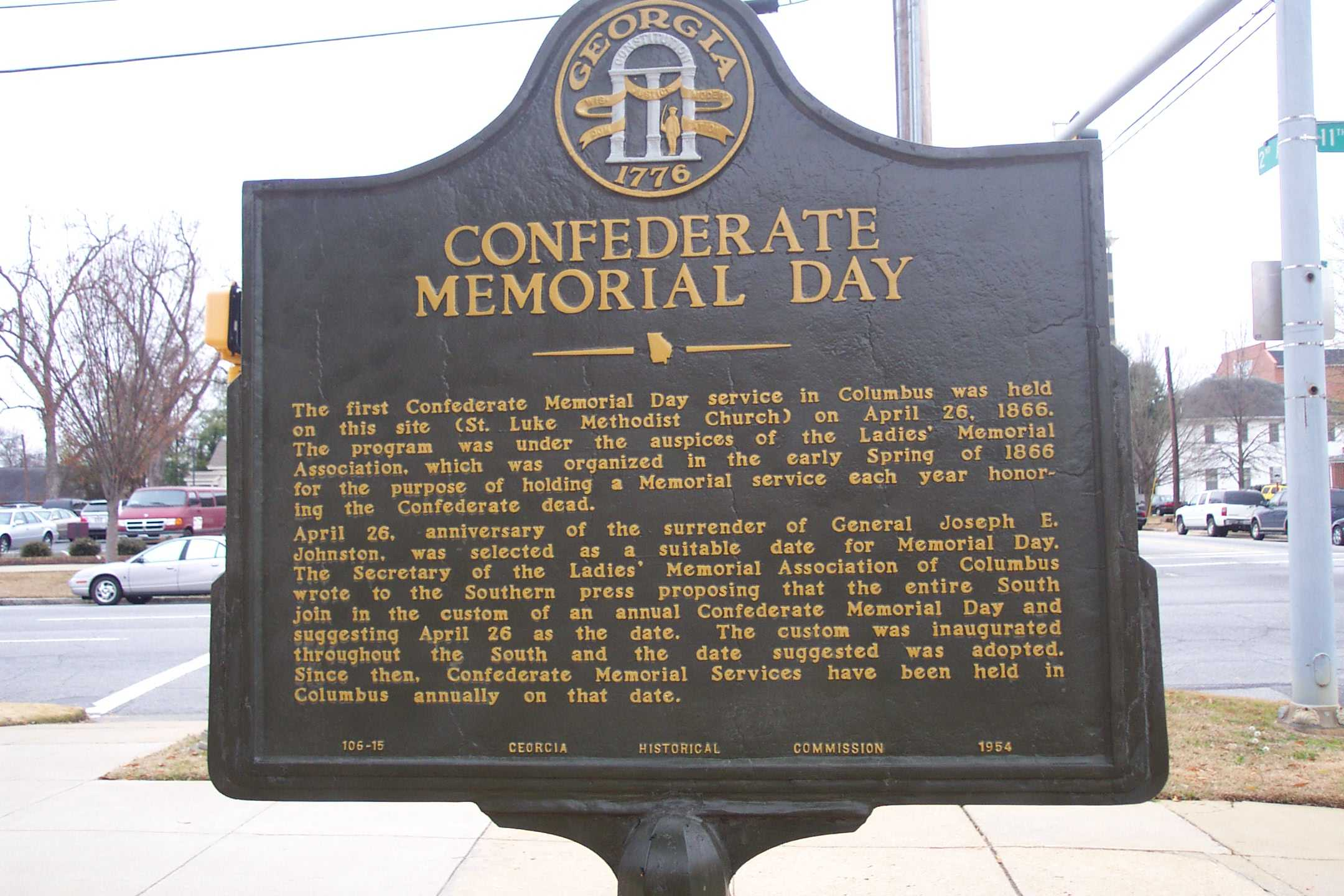
Marker on Second Ave in Columbus, GA explaining Mrs. Williams' role as Secretary of the Ladies' Memorial Association in initiating Memorial Day (It wasn't called "Confederate" Memorial Day until after Logan inaugurated the northern version of the holiday).

=== Post war years ===
In early 1866, the Soldiers’ Aid Society was reorganized as the Ladies Memorial Association at the Tyler home on the corner of 4th ave and 14th street. The building is long gone but a monument marks the spot. The officers elected were Mrs. Robert Carter, president; Mrs. Robert. A. Ware, vice president; Mrs. J. M. McAllister, second vice president, Mrs. M. A. Patten, treasurer and Mrs. Williams was elected Secretary of the Association. As secretary, Mrs. Williams was tasked with writing a letter to the ladies of the South to inaugurate an annual holiday to decorate the soldiers’ graves. It is for this letter that she is best remembered. She was also Trustee and Chairman of the Orphan Asylum and Trustee of the Georgia Memorial Association along with Mary Jane Green. She remained active in these organizations until the end of her life.

=== Death ===
Mrs. Williams died on April 15, 1874, less than two weeks before the ninth observance of Memorial Day in Columbus. Her funeral was held on April 16 and was attended by the Columbus Guards. Ten days later, at the end of the Memorial Day wreath laying ceremonies, the battalion of the Columbus and City Light Guards stacked arms. Then, each soldier proceeded to Mrs. Williams’ grave and one-by-one laid a rose on her grave as they passed.

== Memorial Day ==
=== The letter ===
The letter Mrs. Williams wrote to her two local newspapers was a request to the ladies of the South to set one day aside each year to decorate the soldiers’ graves. It was long on flowery language and was considered a "thrilling appeal". She did not sign her own name but closed the letter with "Southern Women". It was picked up by newspapers across the South. In The Genesis of the Memorial Day Holiday in America, Bellware and Gardiner provided evidence that her letter was published in cities outside of Columbus, Georgia. The External Links below contain pages from fourteen of the newspapers in Georgia, Tennessee, Mississippi, Alabama, Virginia, West Virginia, South Carolina and North Carolina where the letter appeared.

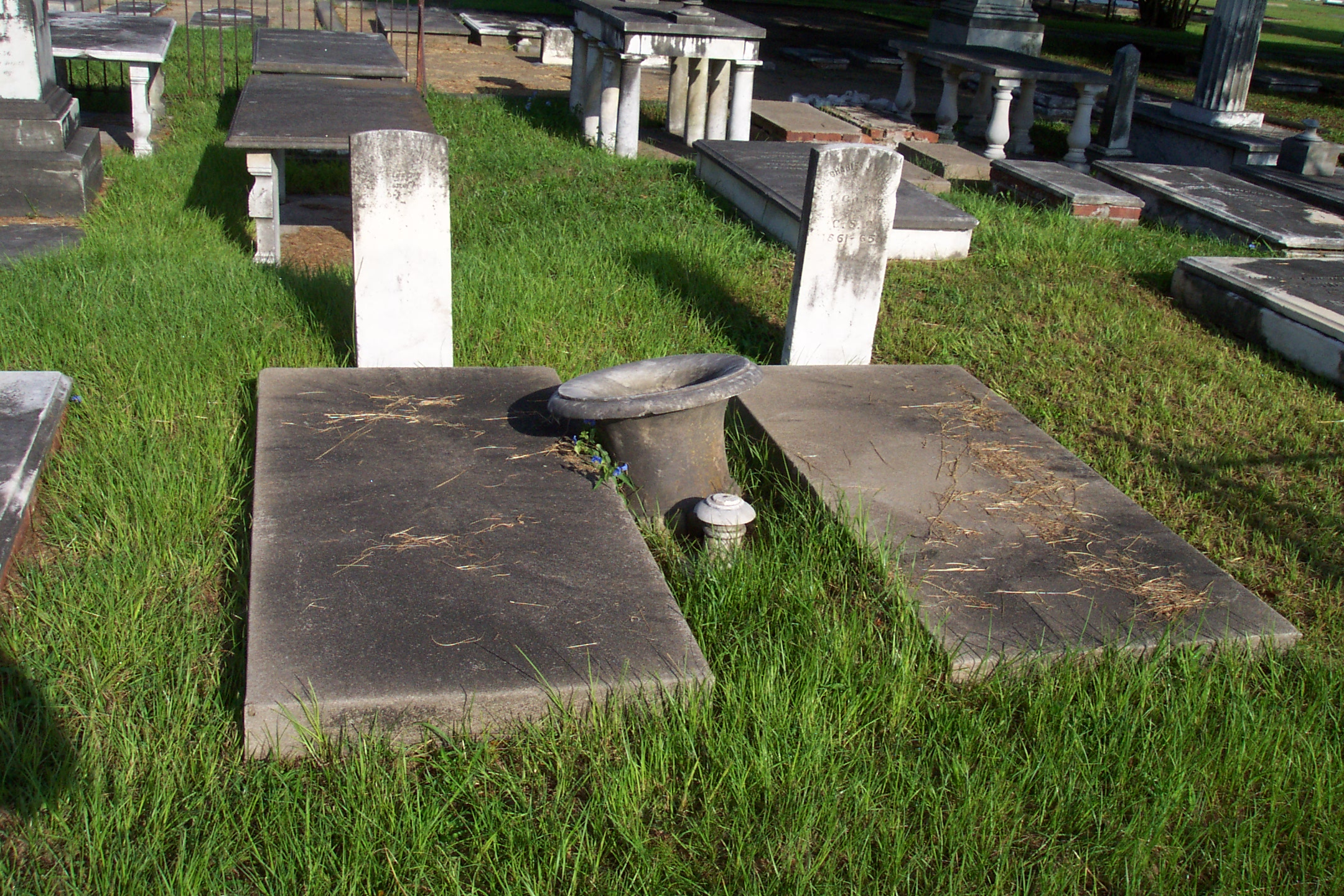
The graves of the founder of Memorial Day, Mary Ann Williams (left) and her husband Col. Charles J. Williams (right) in Linwood Cemetery, Columbus, Georgia.

=== Notice outside the South ===
News of the impending observance spread to cities in the North. Bellware and Gardiner were able to show that Mrs. Williams’ story had gone nationwide. Mrs. Williams’ plan was documented with brief notices in such papers as the New York Times, Hartford Courant, Philadelphia Daily Age and Boston American Traveler.

=== Holiday observed ===
The new holiday was observed throughout the state of Georgia on April 26, 1866, in Atlanta, Augusta, Savannah, Macon, Columbus and numerous other towns. Across the south, it was observed in Montgomery, Alabama; Memphis, Tennessee; Jackson, Mississippi, Louisville, Kentucky, New Orleans and others. In some locations, most notably Virginia, the tributes were observed on different dates. In Richmond, they decorated on May 31. In Winchester, they decorated on June 6 and in Petersburg, they decorated at Blandford Cemetery on June 9. Due to a typographical error, the holiday was also observed a day early in at least one location. The Memphis Appeal apologized for the error in their April 25, 1866 edition. The ladies of Columbus, MS reportedly observed the holiday on April 25, 1866, and also decorated the graves of Union soldiers, as well. Not all the observances were as noble. In Augusta, Georgia, officials did not allow African-Americans to decorate the graves of Union soldiers which resulted in widespread negative press reports.

One person who took notice was General John A. Logan, the future commander-in-chief of the Grand Army of the Republic (GAR). He was the person responsible for the observance of the first northern Memorial Day on May 30, 1868. Bellware and Gardiner point out that Logan knew about the southern holiday from the beginning, as evidenced by a speech on July 4, 1866, at Salem, IL that argued for the rights of the Freedmen while mentioned the southern observances two years before adopting the holiday in the north.
