= Frederick Hibbard =

American sculptor

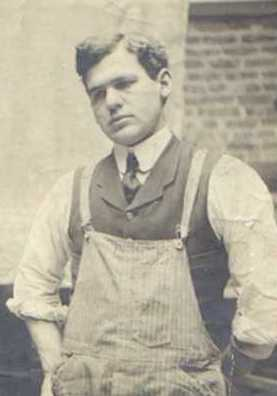

Frederick Cleveland Hibbard (June 15, 1881 – December 12, 1950) was an American sculptor based in Chicago. Hibbard is best remembered for his Civil War memorials, produced to commemorate both the Union and Confederate causes.

== Life and career ==
Born and raised in Canton, Missouri, he graduated from the University of Missouri before deciding to be a sculptor. He studied with Lorado Taft at the School of the Art Institute of Chicago.

Hibbard was a member of the National Sculpture Society and exhibited at their 1923 show held in New York City.

== Selected works ==
- Carter H. Harrison, Union Park, Chicago, Illinois, 1907.
- Samuel Langhorne Clemens (Mark Twain), Riverview Park, Hannibal, Missouri, 1913.
- Volney Rogers Memorial, Mill Creek Park, Youngstown, Ohio, 1920
- Bust of John Ross Callahan, Ohio State University College of Dentistry, Columbus, Ohio, 1923.
- Relief portrait of Jefferson Davis, bronze, Jefferson Davis Monument State Historic Site, Fairview, Kentucky, 1924.
- Tom Sawyer and Huck Finn at the Foot of Cardiff Hill, Cardiff Hill, North & Main Streets, Hannibal, Missouri, 1926.
- Jefferson Davis, marble, Kentucky State Capitol, Frankfort, Kentucky, 1936.
- Jefferson Davis, bronze, Alabama State Capitol, Montgomery, Alabama, 1940.
- Abraham and Mary Todd Lincoln Monument, East Park, Racine, Wisconsin, 1943.
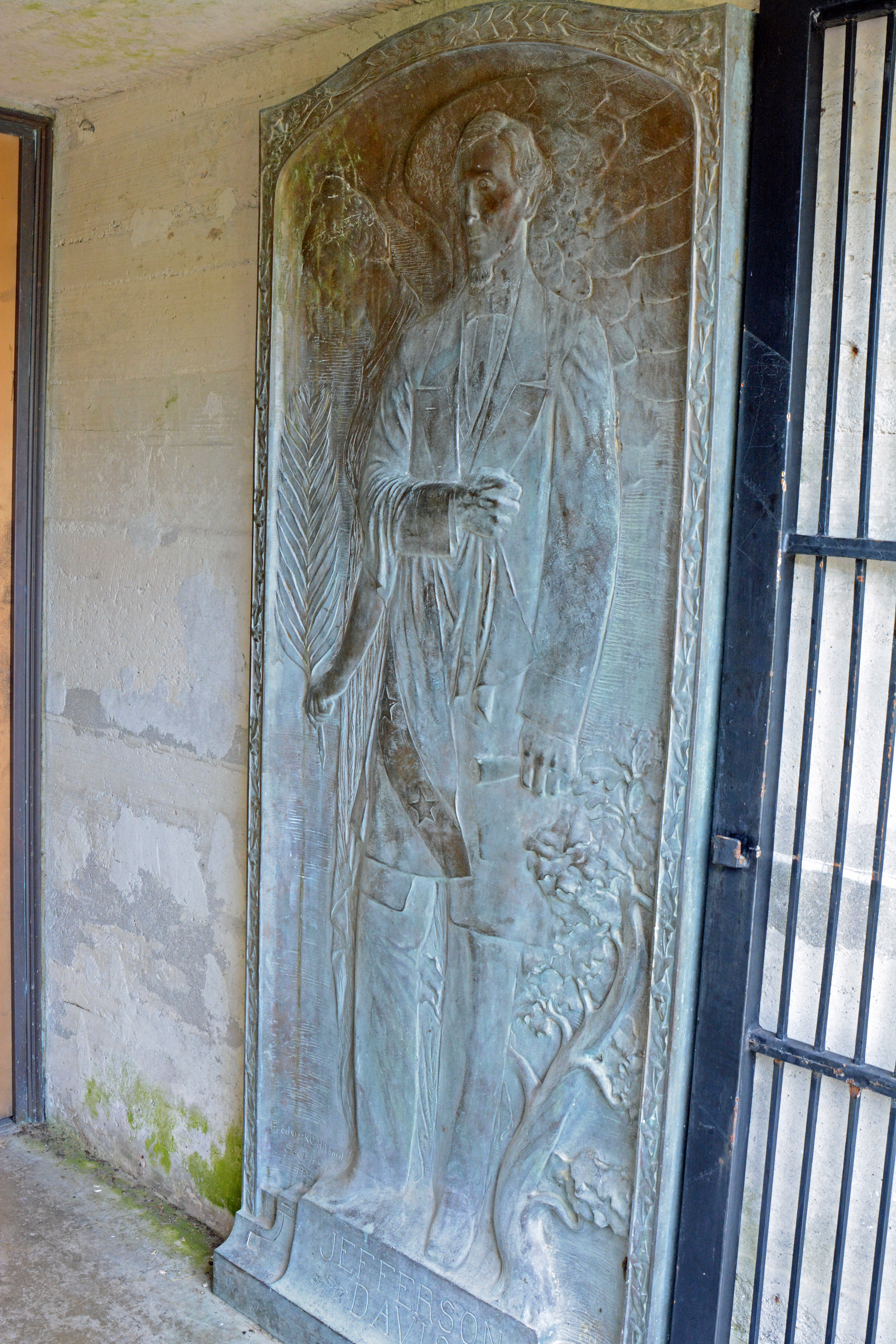
Jefferson Davis (1924), Jefferson Davis State Historic Site, Fairview, Kentucky

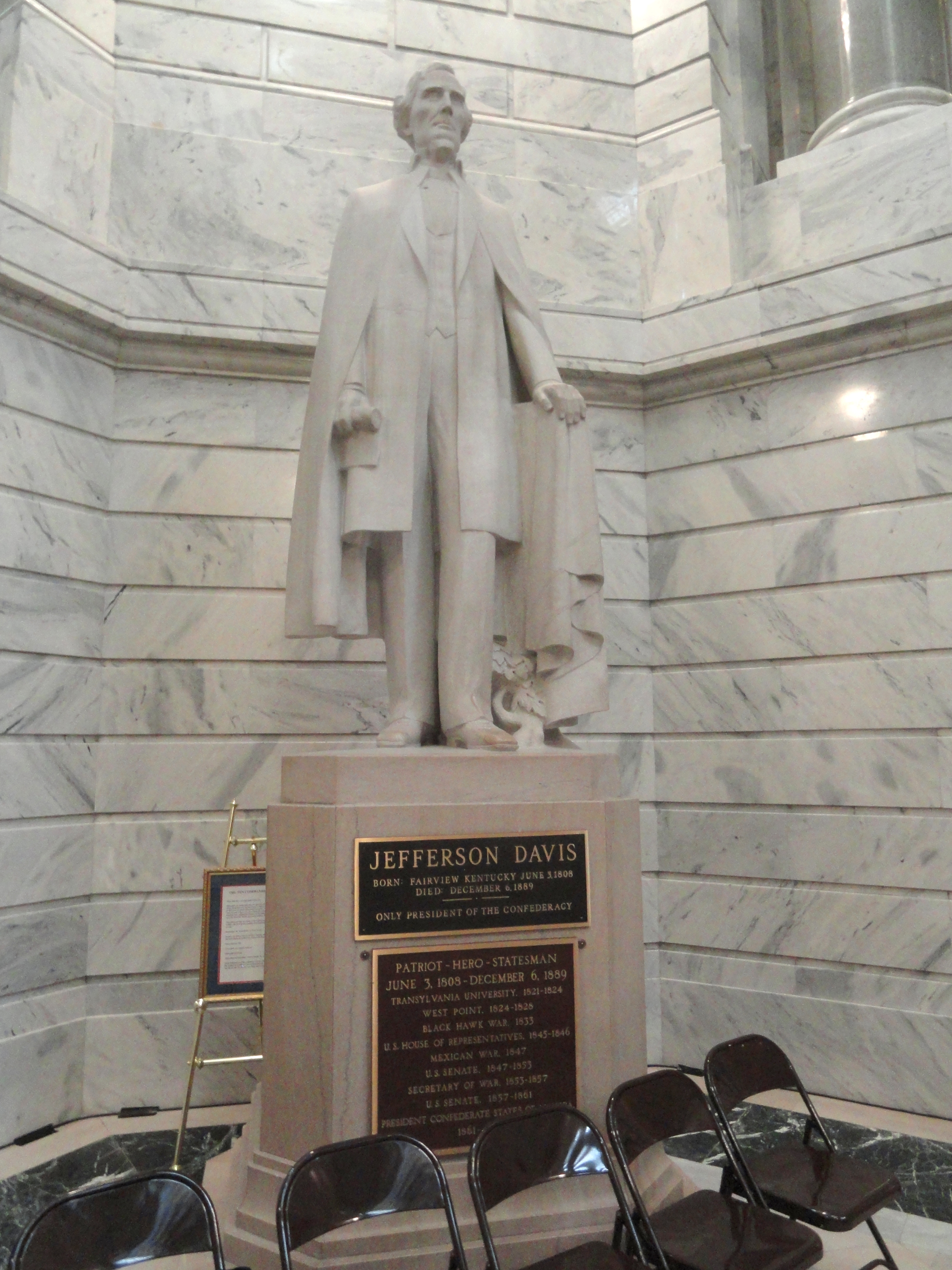
Jefferson Davis (1936), Kentucky State Capitol, Frankfort

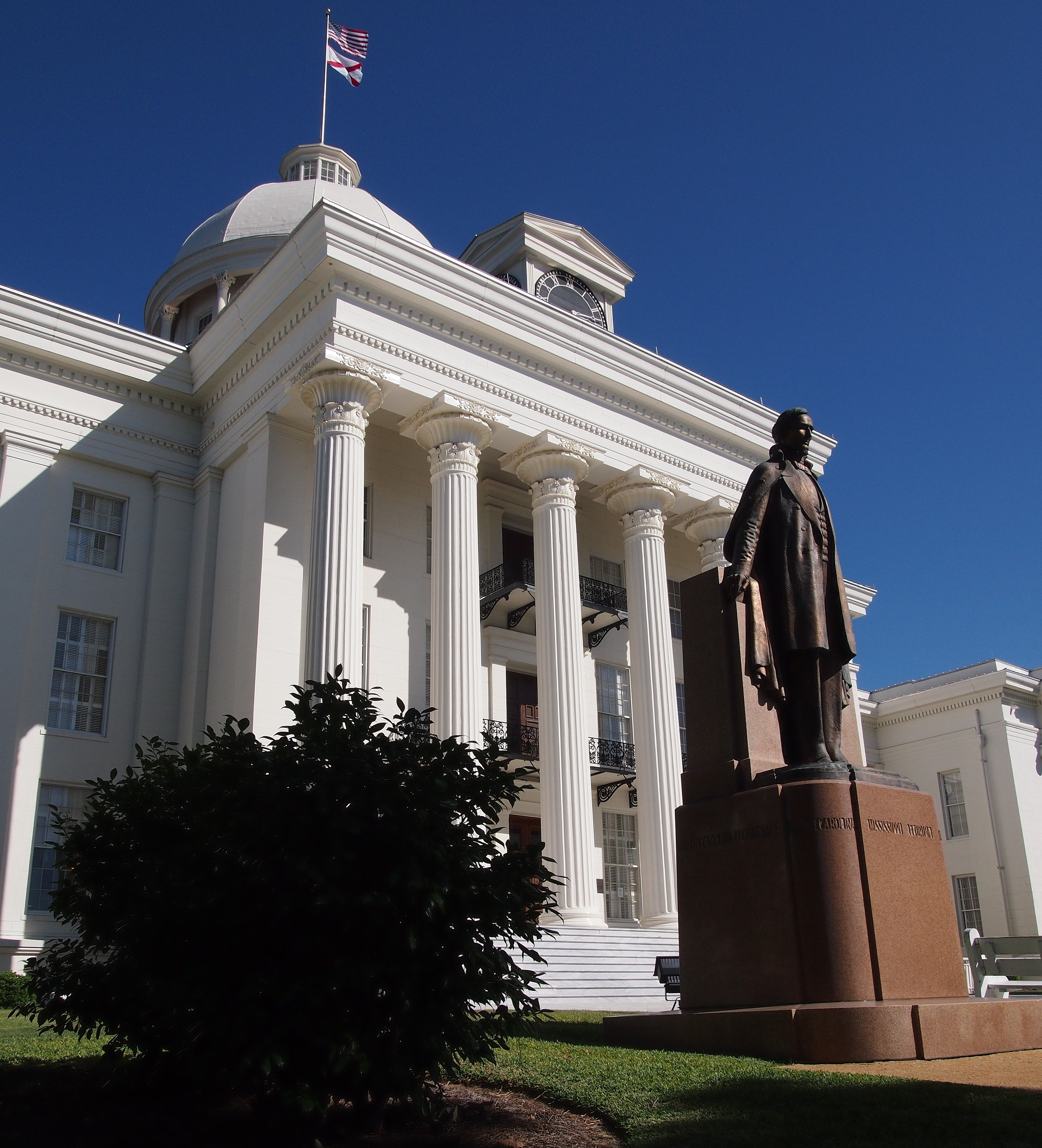
Jefferson Davis (1940), Alabama State Capitol, Montgomery

=== Military monuments and memorials ===
- Statue of bald eagle on Illinois Memorial, Vicksburg National Military Park, 1906.
- Confederate Soldier Monument, Monroe County Courthouse, Forsyth, Georgia, 1907–08.
- General James Shields, Carroll County Courthouse, Carrollton, Missouri, 1910.
  - A replica is at the Minnesota State Capitol in Saint Paul.
- Artillery, Cavalry, Infantry, Navy, Sedgwick County Soldiers and Sailors Monument, Wichita, Kansas, 1913. E. M. Viquesney designed the monument and modeled the Victory figure atop its dome.
- Confederate Memorial, erected by the United Daughters of the Confederacy, Shiloh National Military Park, 1917
- Col. Alexander Doniphan, Ray County Courthouse, Richmond, Missouri, 1917–18.
- Equestrian Statue of General Ulysses S. Grant, Vicksburg National Military Park, Vicksburg, Mississippi, 1919.
- Col. David N. Foster, Swinney Park, Ft. Wayne, Indiana, 1922.
- Parade Rest and Lookout, Soldiers and Sailors National Military Museum and Memorial, Pittsburgh, Pennsylvania. 1923.
- James Pendergast Memorial, Case Park, Kansas City, MO. 1913.
- Fawn fountain, at Promontory Point (Chicago)
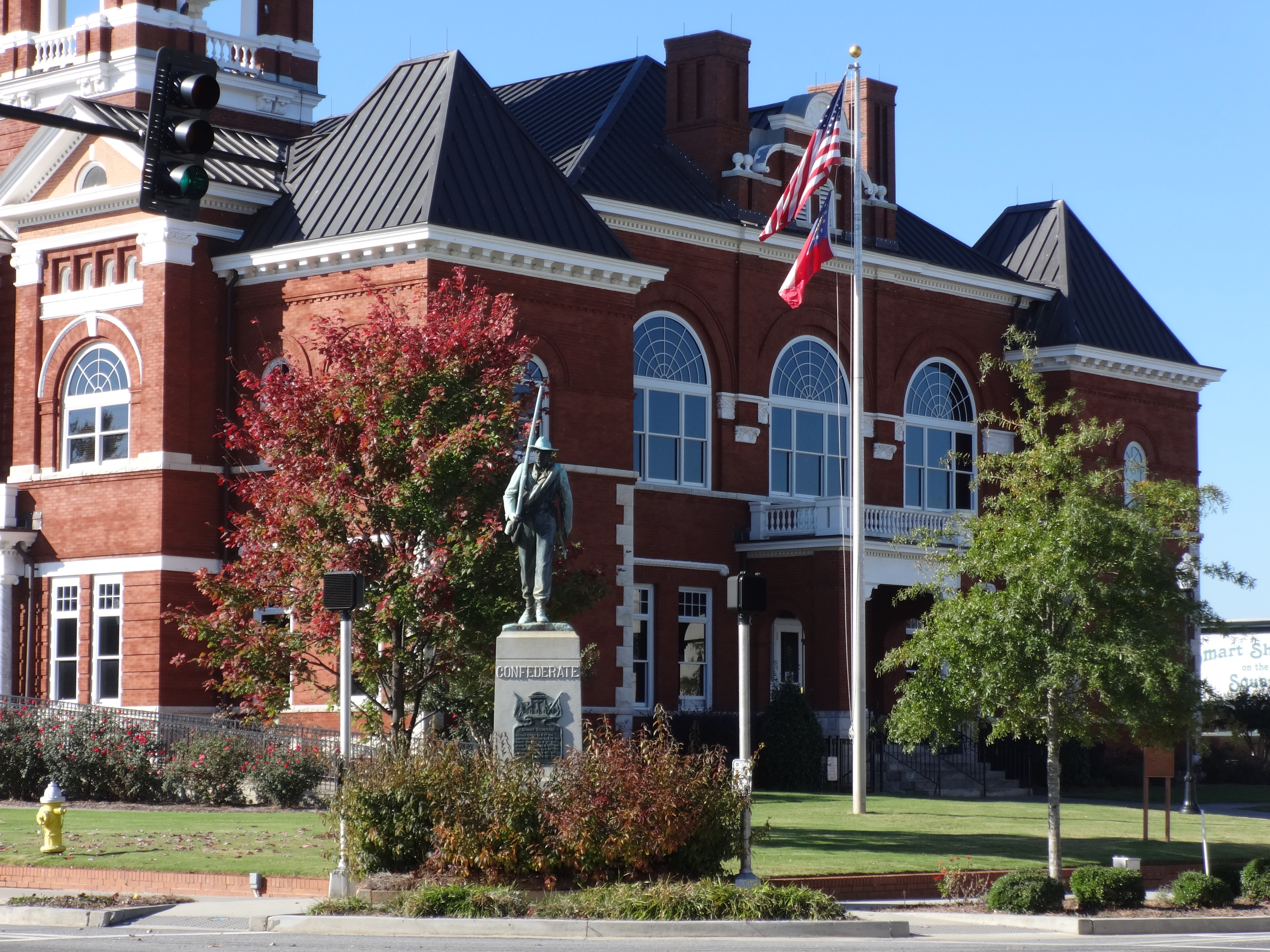
Confederate Soldier Monument (1908), Forsyth, Georgia

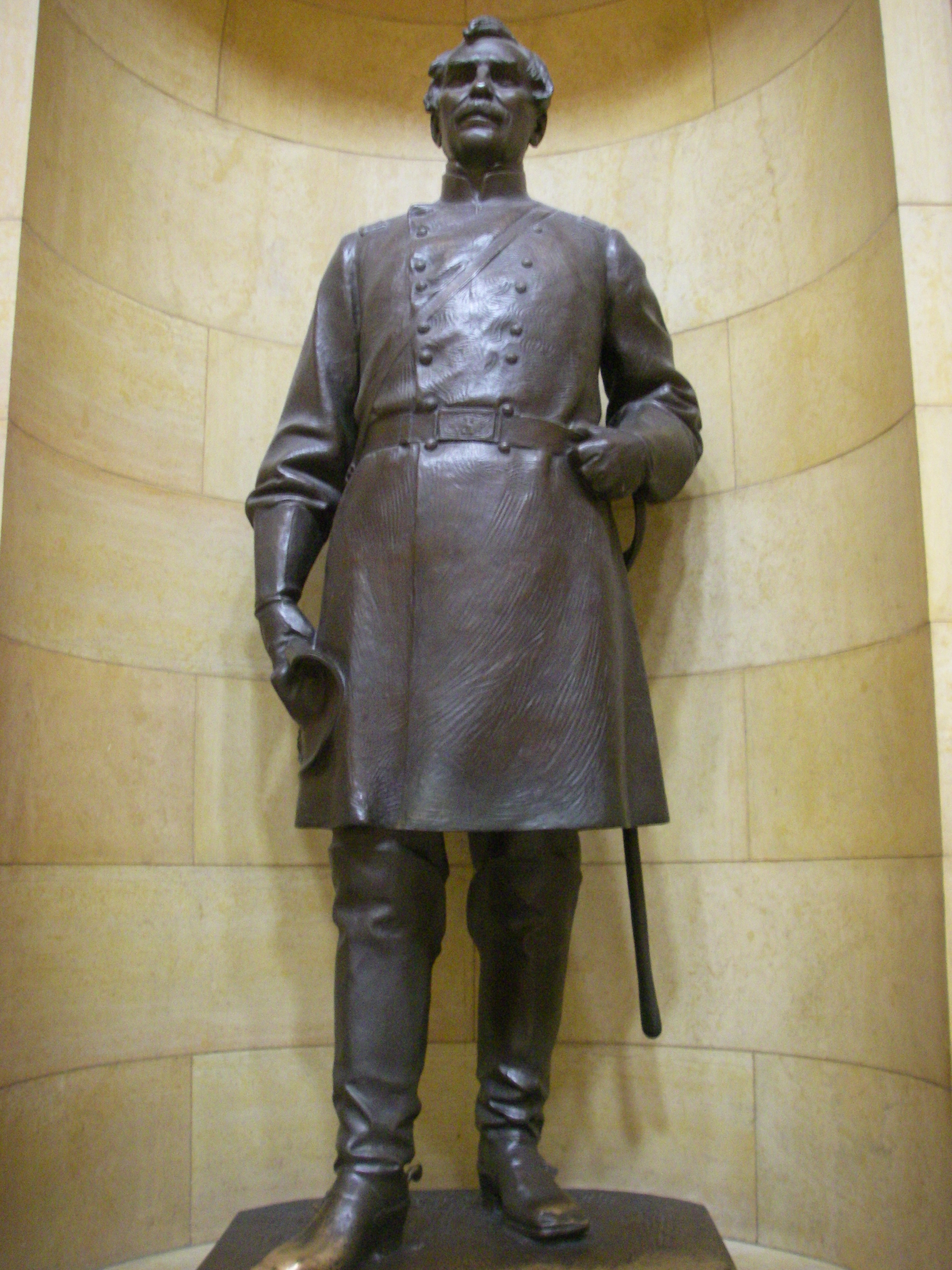
General James Shields (1910), Minnesota State Capitol, Saint Paul, Minnesota.

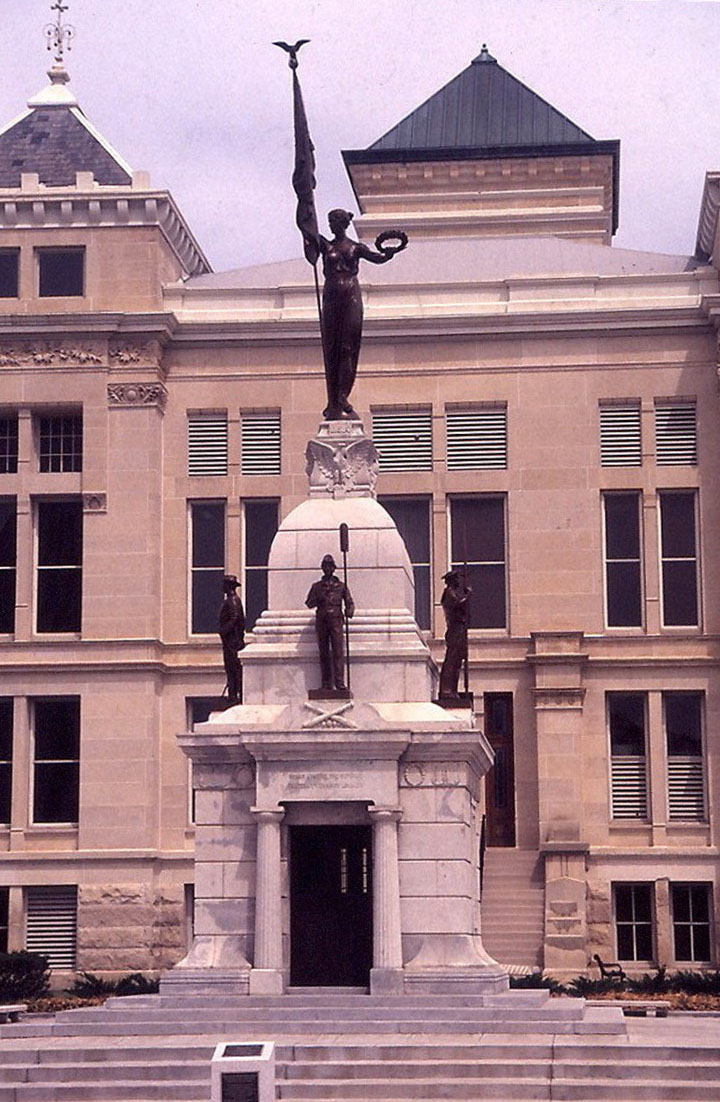
4 military figures (1913), Sedgwick County Soldiers and Sailors Monument, Wichita, Kansas

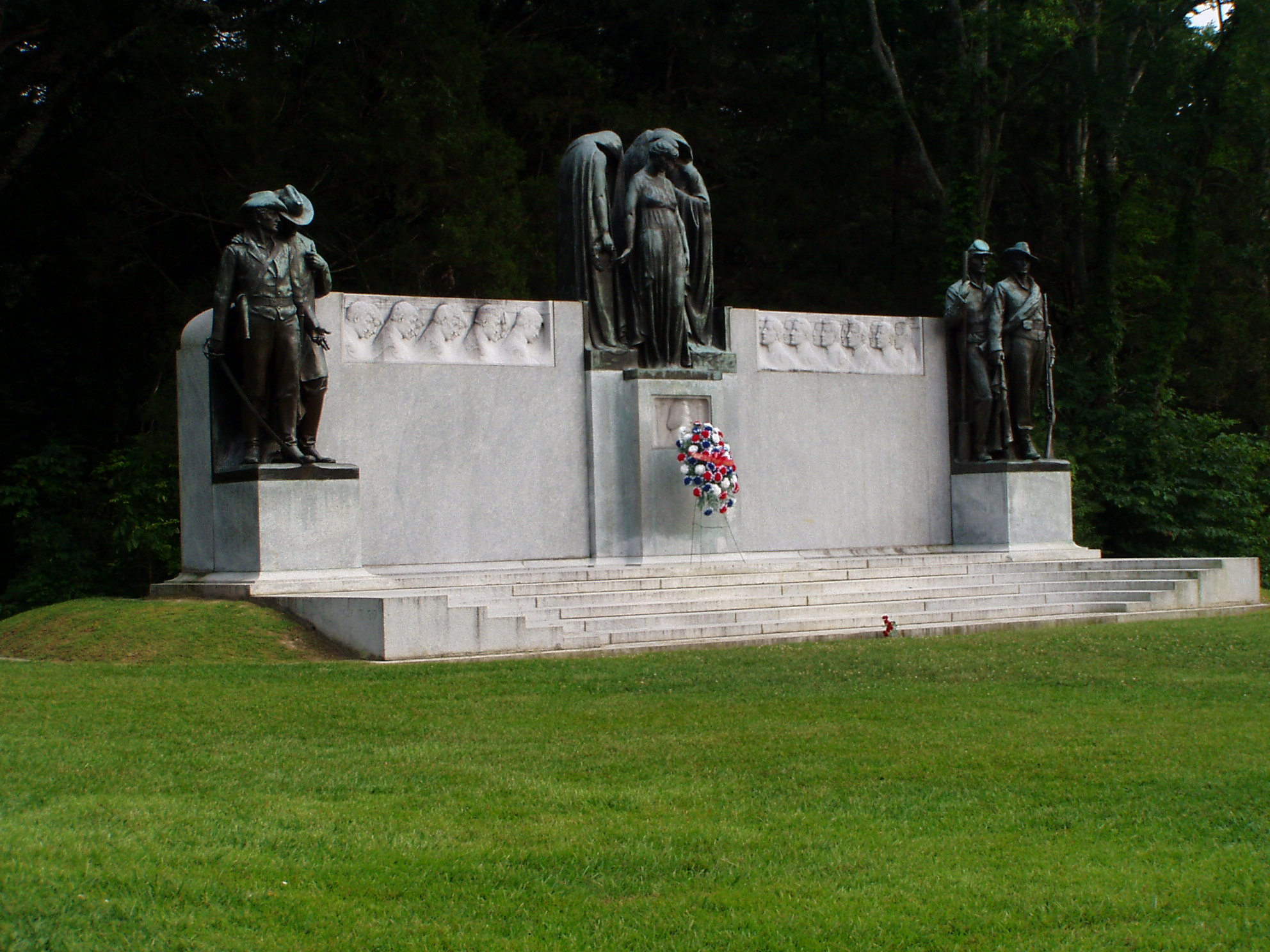
Confederate Memorial (1917), Shiloh National Military Park, Tennessee

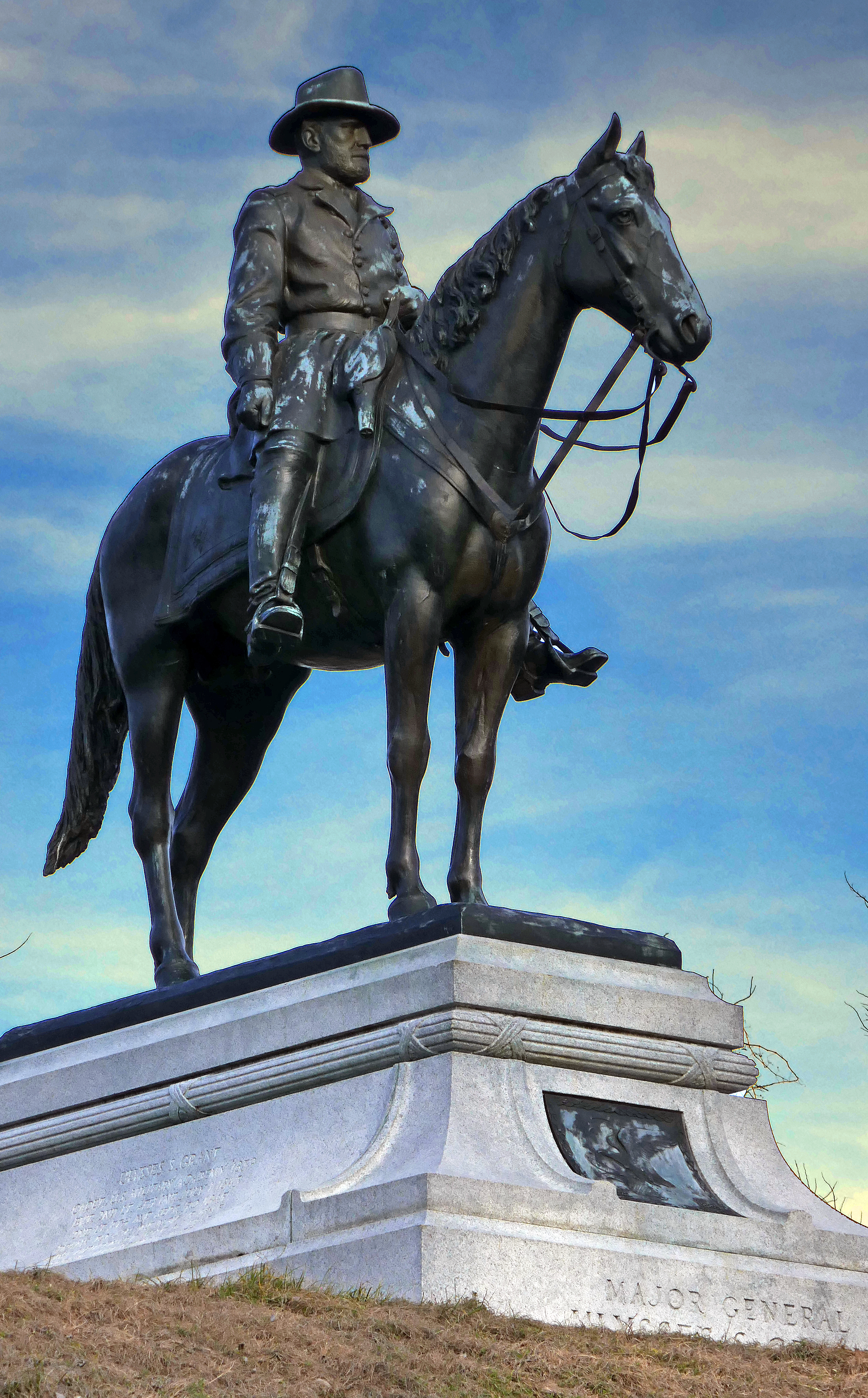
General Grant (1919), Vicksburg National Military Park, Vicksburg, Mississippi.

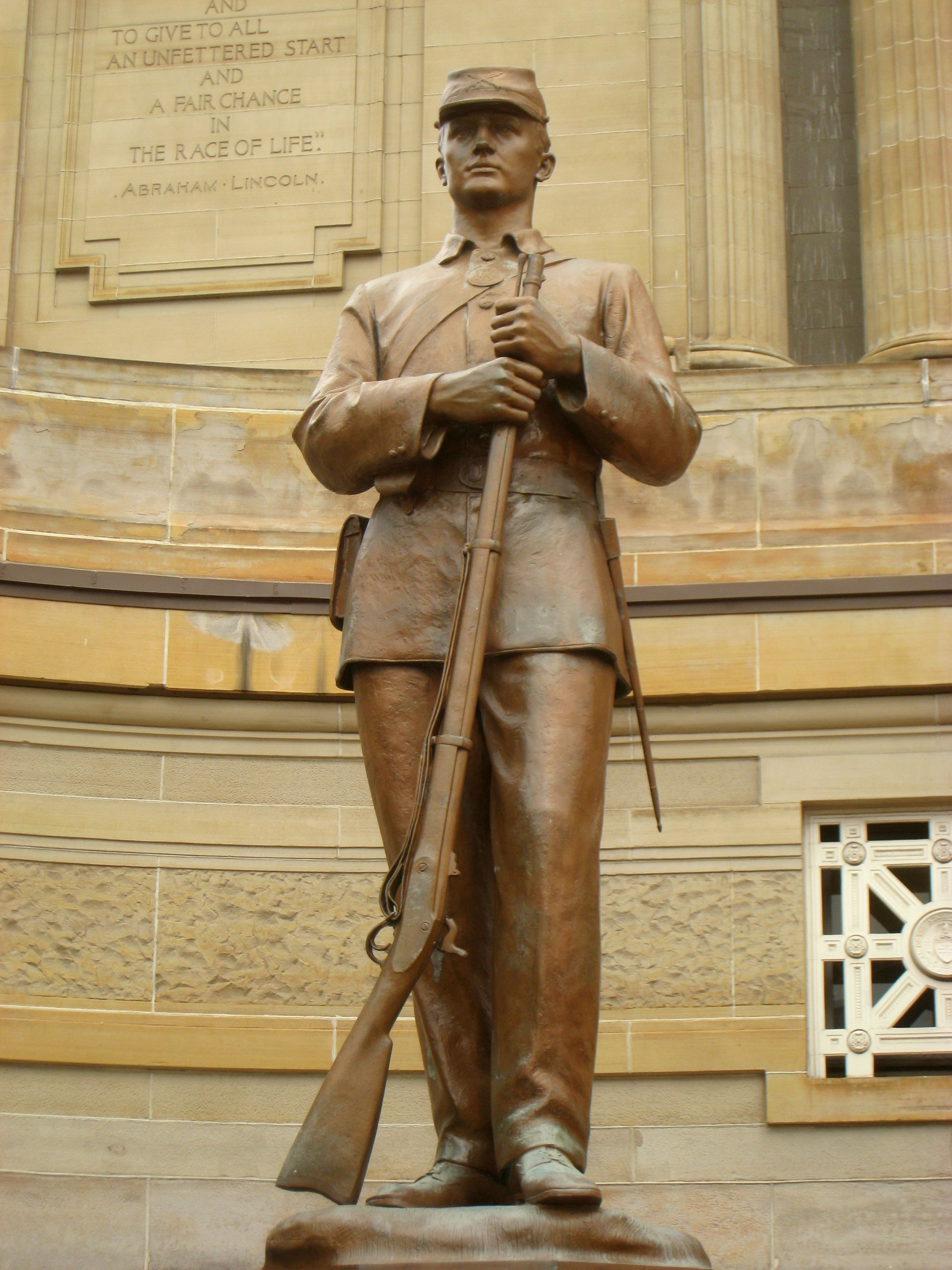
Parade Rest (1922–23), Soldiers and Sailors National Military Museum and Memorial, Pittsburgh, Pennsylvania.

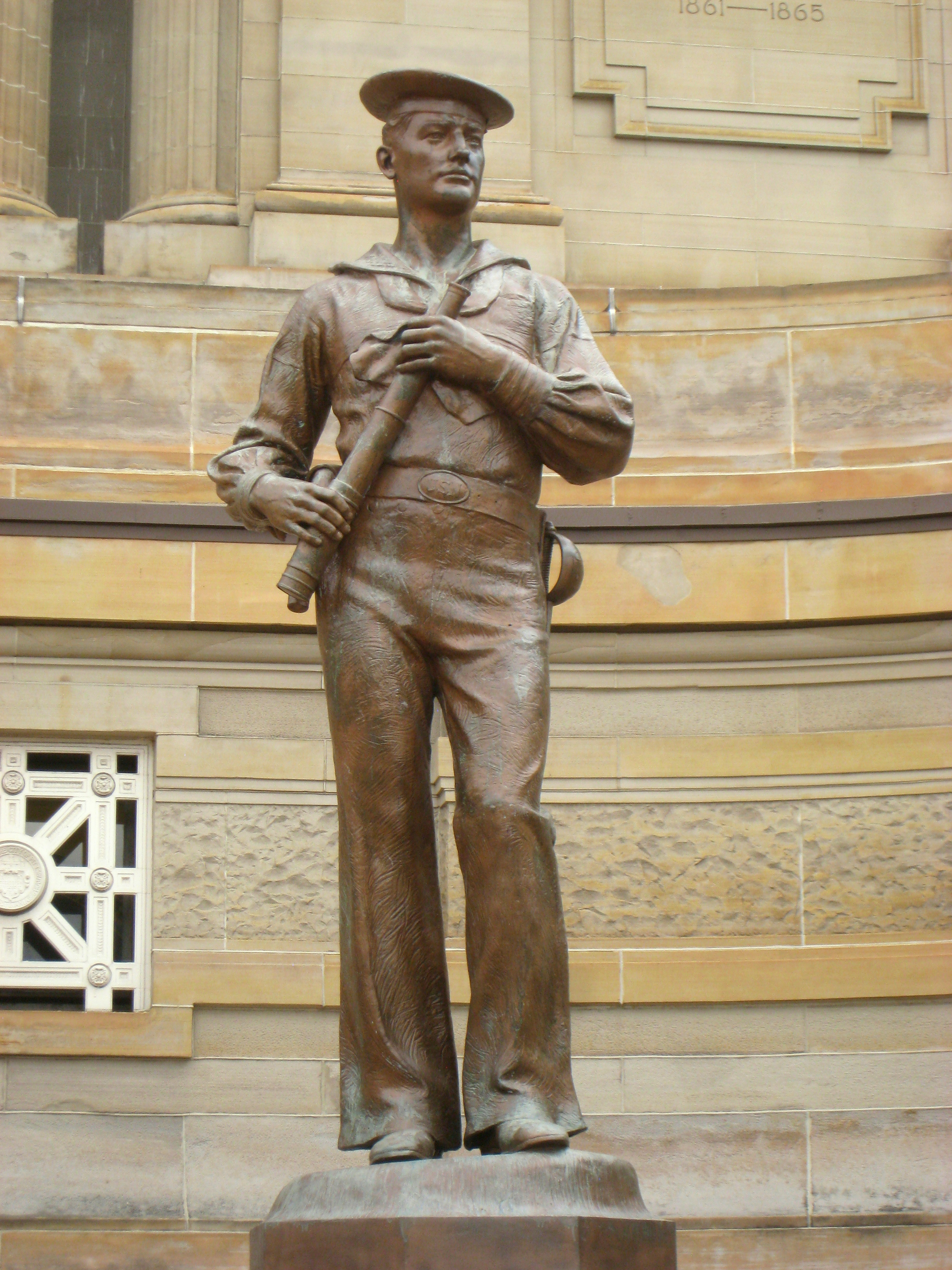
Lookout (1922–23), Soldiers and Sailors National Military Museum and Memorial, Pittsburgh, Pennsylvania.

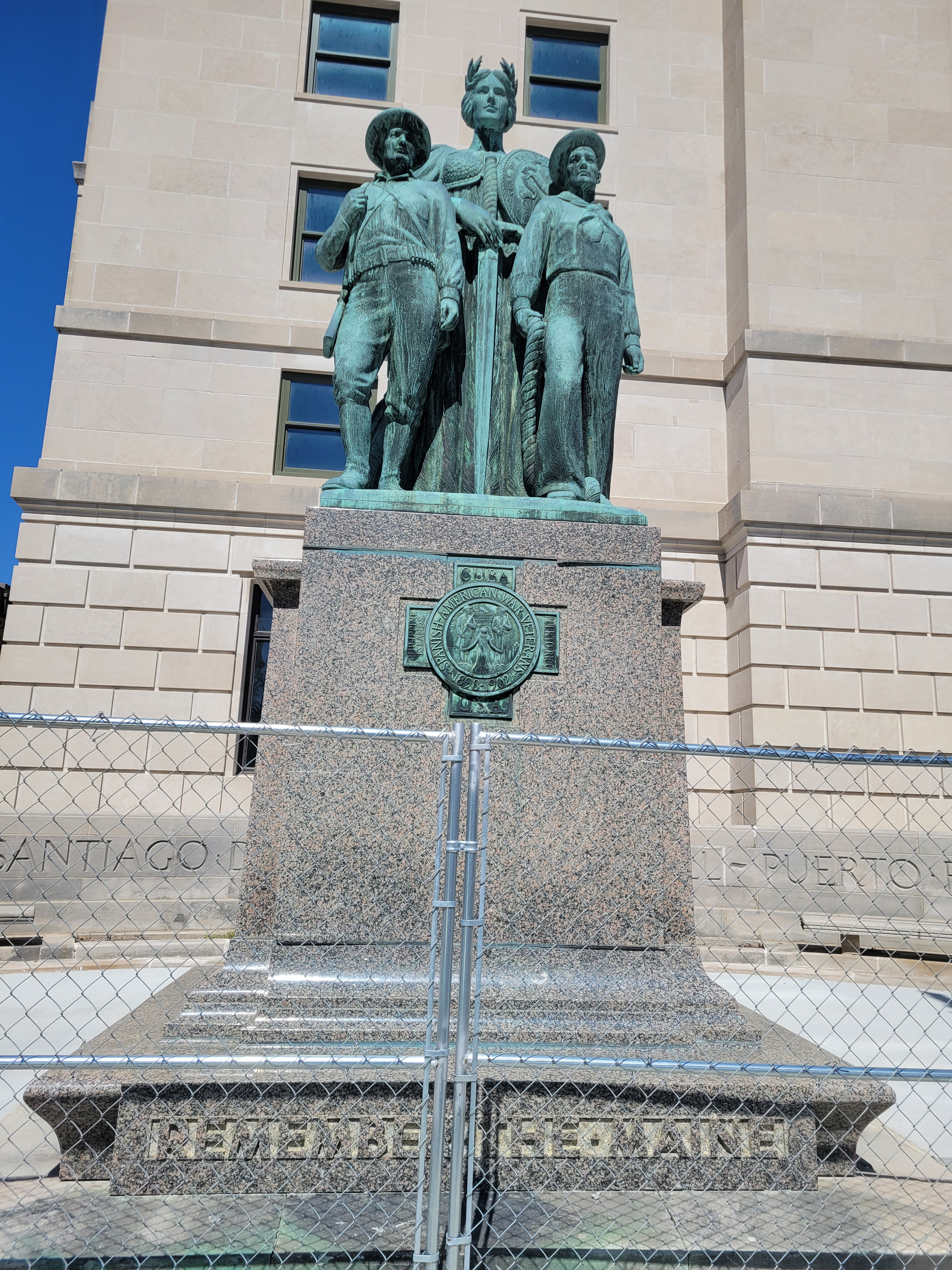
Spanish-American War memorial (1948), Springfield, Illinois.
