= Sedgwick County Memorial Hall and Soldiers and Sailors Monument =

- U.S. National Register of Historic Places
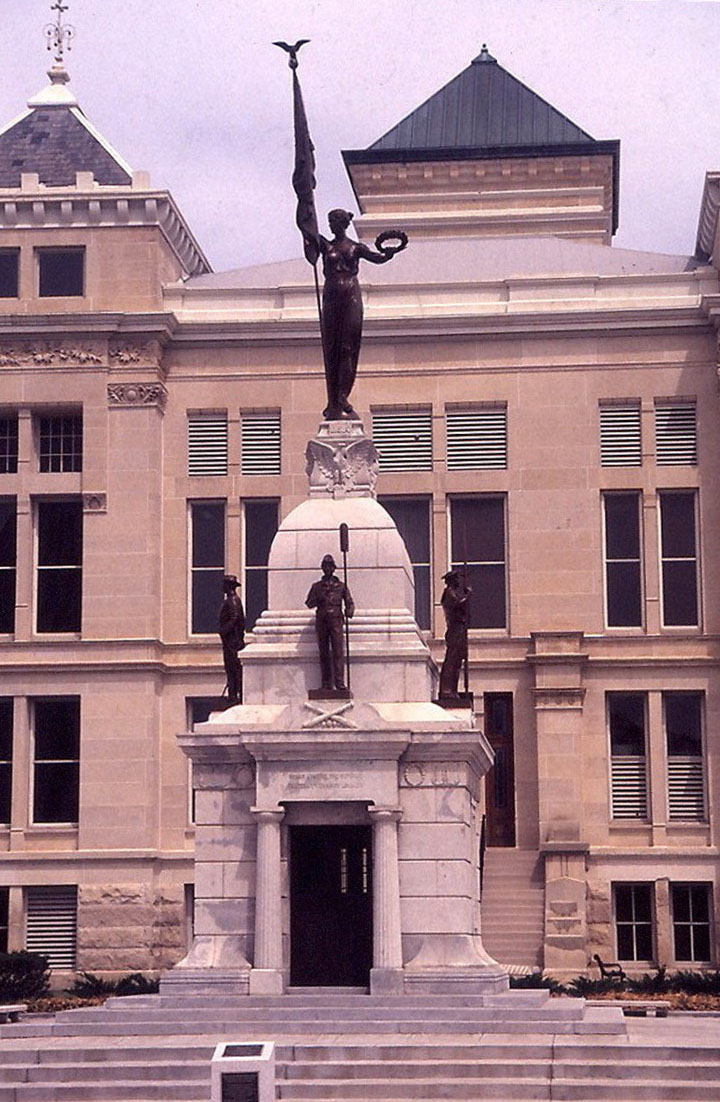
- Sedgwick County Memorial Hall and Soldiers and Sailors Monument

- Location within Kansas Location within the United States
- Location: 510 N. Main, Wichita, Kansas
- Coordinates: 37°41′38″N 97°20′15″W
- Area: less than one acre
- Built: 1913
- Architect: Ernest Monroe Viquesney, et al.
- Architectural style: Second Empire
- NRHP reference No.: 98001359
- Added to NRHP: November 20, 1998

Sedgwick County Memorial Hall and Soldiers and Sailors Monument (1911–13) is a Civil War monument on the grounds of the Old Sedgwick County Courthouse, in Wichita, Kansas. It was designed by E. M. Viquesney, with sculpture by Frederick Hibbard and the W. H. Mullins Manufacturing Company. The idea to construct a memorial to Sedgwick County Civil War veterans began with two local GAR posts in 1904, but sufficient funds were not available until in 1911. In that year the Kansas State Legislature passed a one-time county tax levy to fund the building of monuments in counties with a population of over 72,000.

The monument consists of a Second Empire granite pavilion adorned with five statues. Its dome is crowned by a hammered copper figure of Liberty holding a flag and a laurel wreath, made by the W. H. Mullins Company of Salem, Ohio. At the base of the dome are four life-sized bronze figures by Hibbard representing the Infantry, Cavalry, Artillery, and Navy. Inscriptions on the monument's four facades list the battles, dates and locations in which local soldiers fought. The Liberty figure originally faced the courthouse, but after its installation the veterans decided that the statue should face outward. Rotating it 180 degrees delayed the monument's dedication from Lincoln's Birthday to Flag Day. The monument's interior features a Memorial Hall, 12 feet square, with two marble-and-glass cases displaying war relics. The Hall remained locked for 25 years because the key had been lost. The key was found again in 1948.

The monument was dedicated June 14, 1913. It was restored (2000–01), and rededicated on Veterans Day, November 11, 2001.

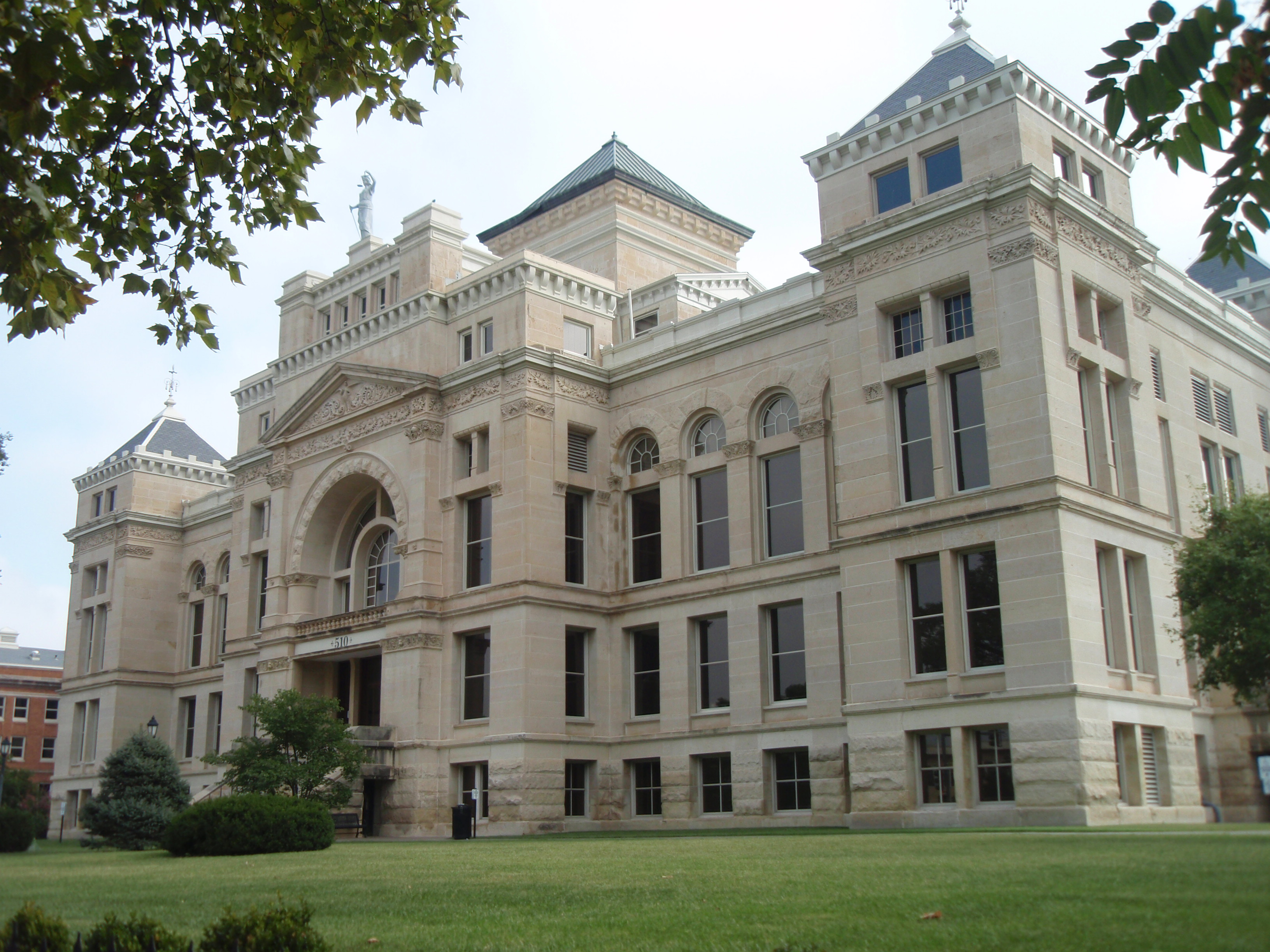
Old Sedgwick County Courthouse

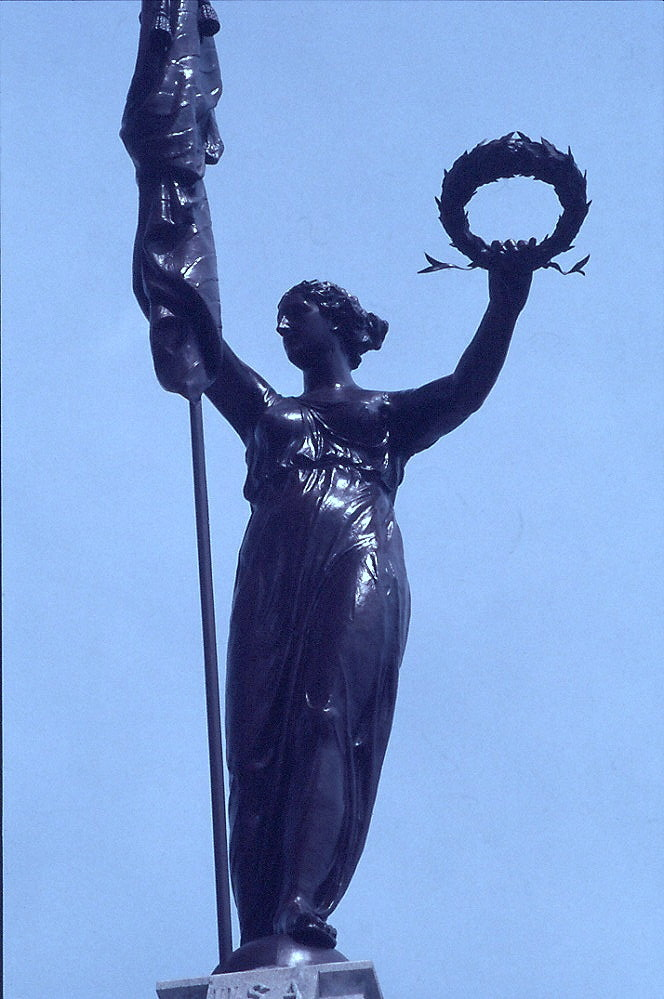
Victory

== See also ==
- 1913 in art
- National Register of Historic Places listings in Sedgwick County, Kansas
