= Soldiers and Sailors Memorial Hall and Museum =

Landmark in Pittsburgh, Pennsylvania

Coordinates: 40°26′42″N 79°57′23″W

- Soldiers and Sailors Military Museum and Memorial
- U.S. National Register of Historic Places
- U.S. Historic district – Contributing property
- City of Pittsburgh Historic Structure
- Pittsburgh Landmark – PHLF
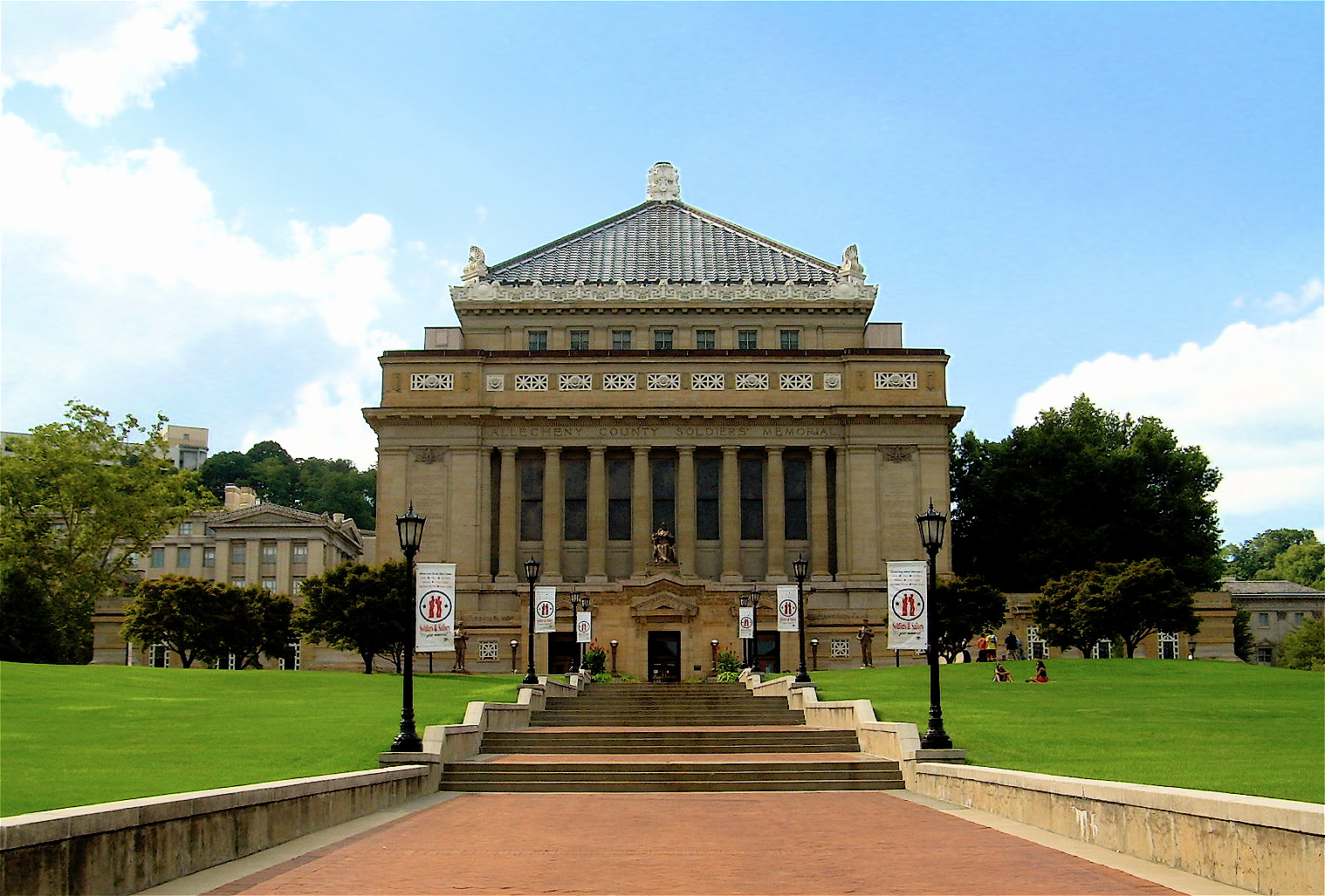
- Front view of the memorial and its lawn from Fifth Avenue
- Location: Pittsburgh, Pennsylvania
- Built: 1908-1910
- Architect: Henry Hornbostel
- Architectural style: Beaux-Arts
- Part of: Schenley Farms Historic District (ID83002213)
- NRHP reference No.: 74001746

Significant dates
- Added to NRHP: December 30, 1974
- Designated CP: July 22, 1983
- Designated CPHS: February 11, 1991
- Designated PHLF: 1970

The Soldiers and Sailors Memorial Hall and Museum (or often simply Soldiers and Sailors Memorial Hall) is a National Register of Historic Places landmark that is located in Pittsburgh, Pennsylvania, United States. It is the largest memorial in the United States that is dedicated solely to honoring all branches of military veterans and service personnel.

== History and notable features ==
This historic building was conceived by the Grand Army of the Republic during the 1890s as a way for Pittsburgh and Allegheny County residents to honor the dwindling ranks of American Civil War veterans; it was built on what had served as a Union Army mustering ground during the war. The memorial now represents all branches of the service and honors career and citizen soldiers who have served the United States throughout its history.

Architect Henry Hornbostel designed this memorial in 1907. Dedicated in 1910, the building was created in the Beaux-Arts style and is heroic in scale. It is located in the Oakland section of Pittsburgh at 4141 Fifth Avenue (although the walkway leading to its main entrance is signed as "Matthew Ridgway Blvd." in honor of the World War II and Korean War hero who called Pittsburgh home). Surrounded on all sides by the campus of the University of Pittsburgh and adjacent to the university's landmark Cathedral of Learning, the building is set back from Fifth Avenue. It features expansive, well-kept lawns with large cannons and other war implements. The side streets flanking the building are Bigelow Boulevard and University Place, with O'Hara Street directly behind the memorial.

It houses rare and one-of-a-kind exhibits that span the eras from the American Civil War to present-day conflicts. Since 1963, it has been home to the "Hall of Valor", an exhibit that honors individual veterans from the region who went above and beyond the call of duty. The hall currently pays tribute to more than six hundred honorees, including winners of the Medal of Honor, the Kearny Cross, the Distinguished Service Cross, the Navy Cross, the Air Force Cross, the Silver Star, and the Distinguished Flying Cross.

The building houses an auditorium that seats 2,500, a banquet hall, meeting rooms, and a museum. The expansive lawn of the memorial sits on top of an underground parking garage operated under a long-term lease by the University of Pittsburgh.

It has served as host for many city, civic, university, and business events, including an April 25, 1978, Gulf Oil Corporation shareholders meeting.

== Filming location ==
- The 1991 psychological horror film Silence of the Lambs features the hall as the Memphis Courthouse, where the film's villain, Hannibal Lecter is kept in a makeshift cell.
- The 2009 horror film Sorority Row uses the hall as the site of a graduation.

== Famous visitors ==
- Ferdinand Foch visited the hall in 1921.
- Garner Ted Armstrong of The World Tomorrow spoke at The Soldiers and Sailors Memorial Hall on March 25, 1978.
- G. E. Lowman spoke at the hall on April 23, 1938, and again in 1962
- Nelson Mandela spoke at the hall on December 6, 1991.
- Barack Obama visited the hall in 2008.
- Donald Trump spoke at the hall on April 13, 2016.

== Gallery ==
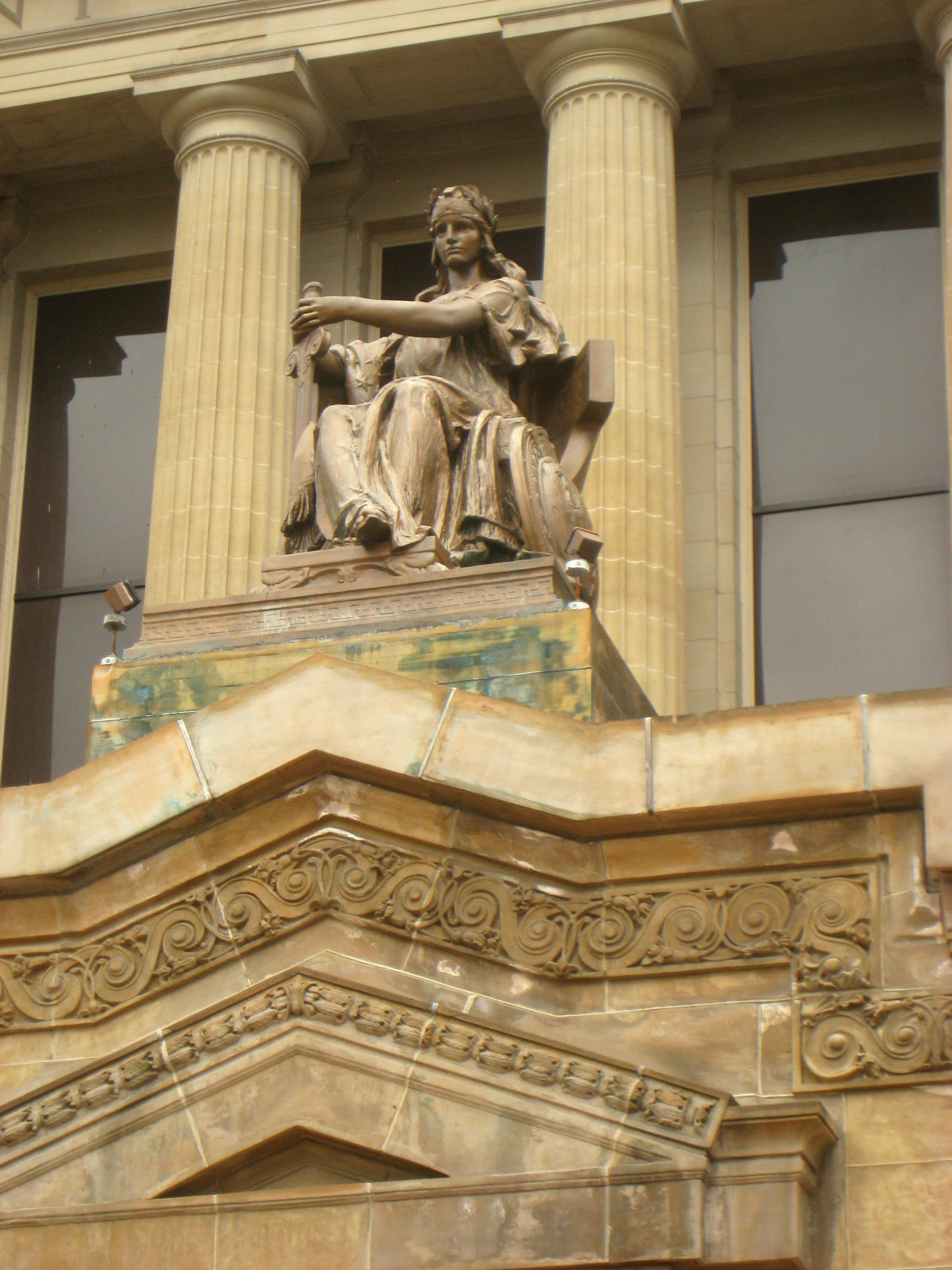
The bronze work America (1910) by Charles Keck sits above the entrance to the memorial

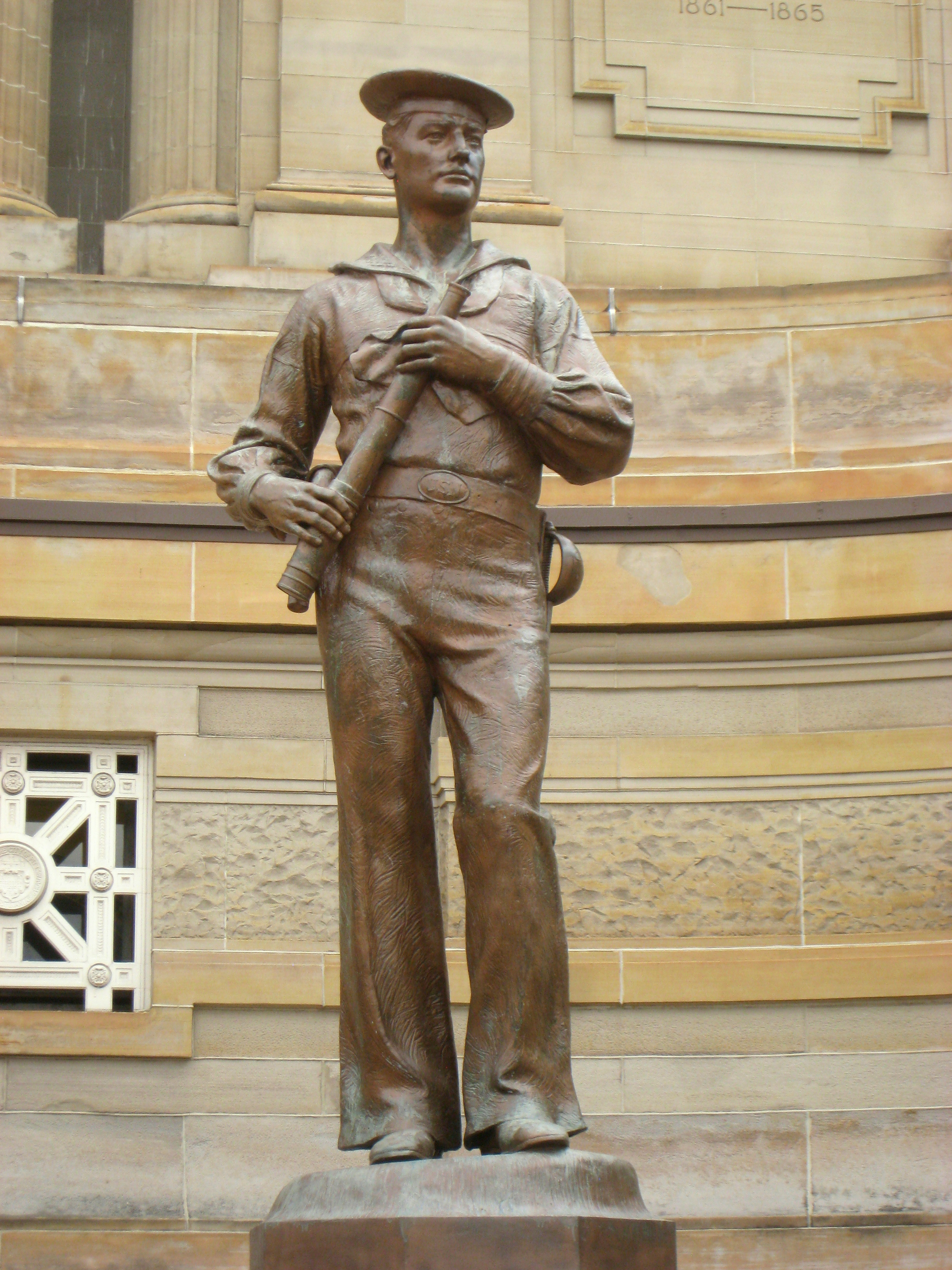
The cast bronze Lookout (1923) by Frederick Hibbard on the memorial grounds.

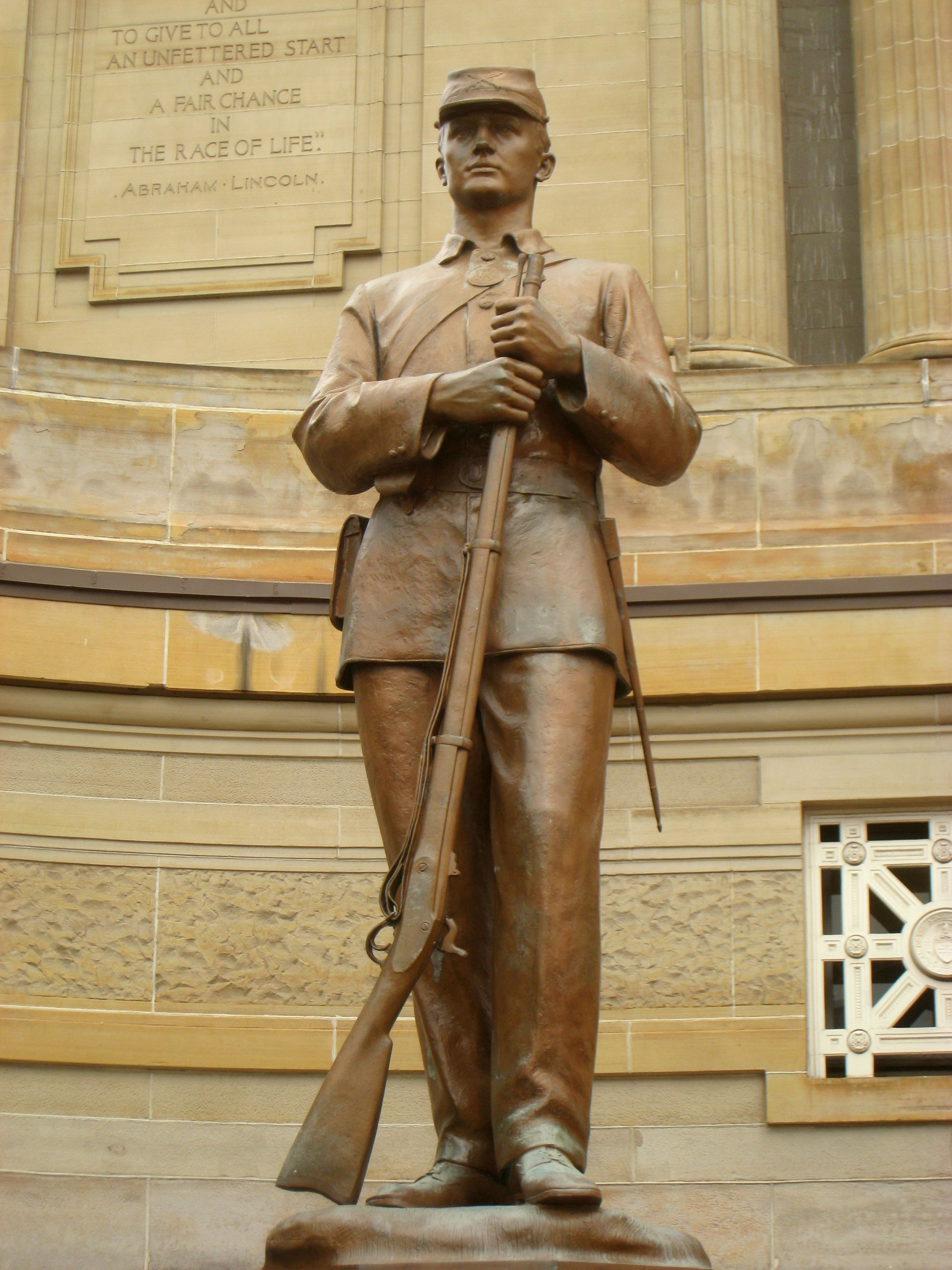
Cast bronze Parade Rest (1923) by Frederick Hibbard on the memorial grounds.

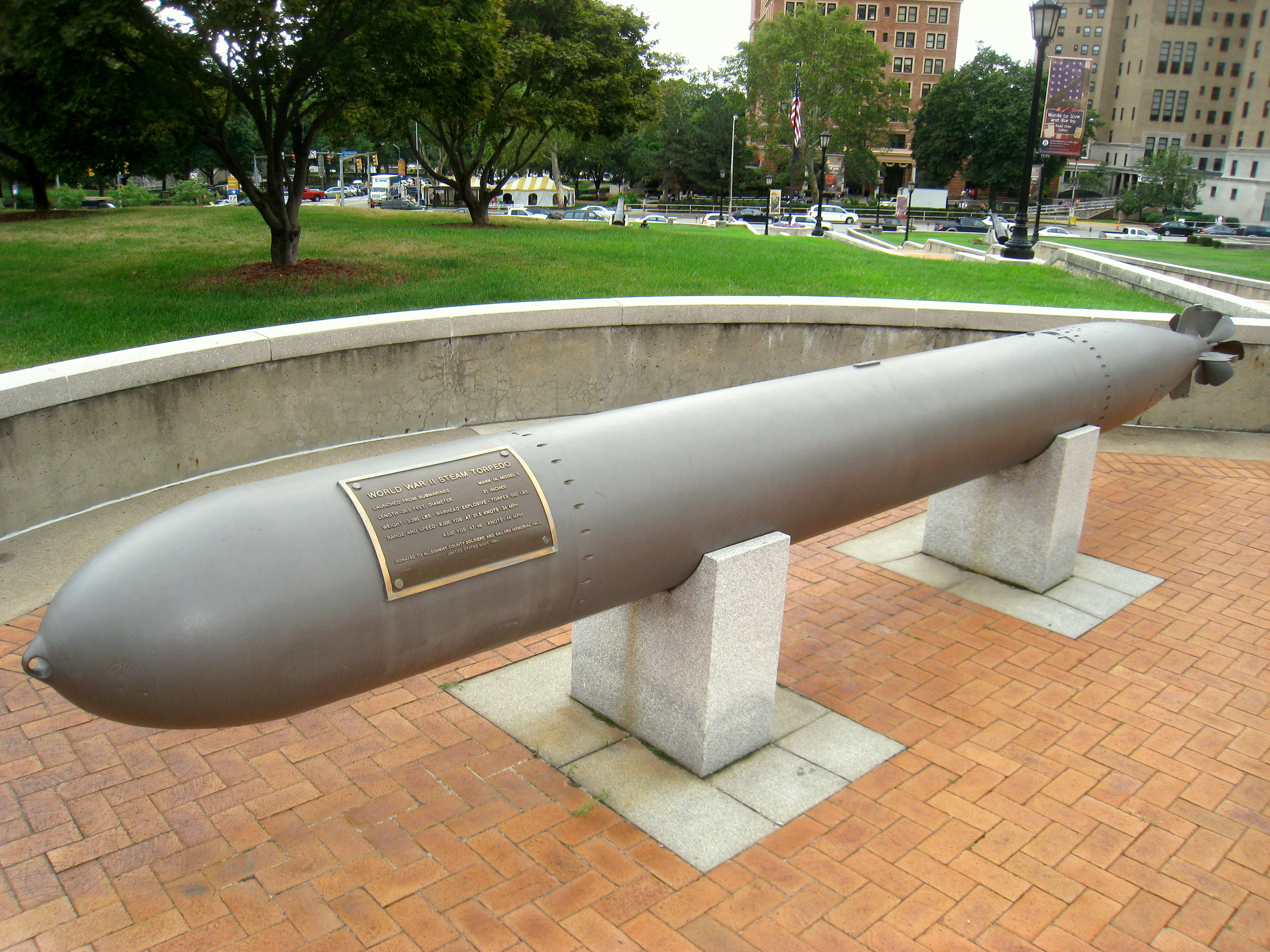
World War II torpedo monument outside of the memorial

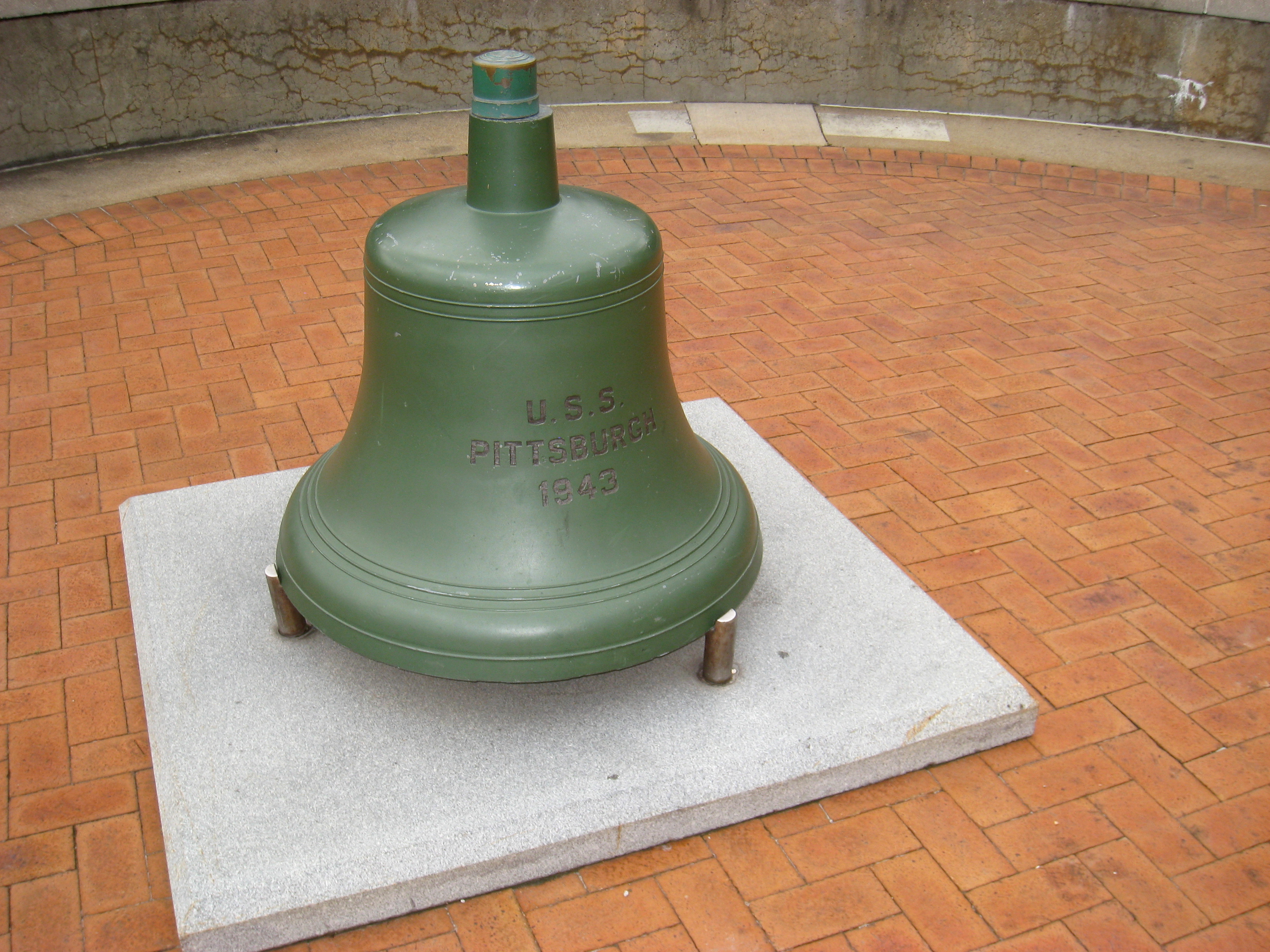
Bell from the heavy cruiser USS Pittsburgh (CA-72)

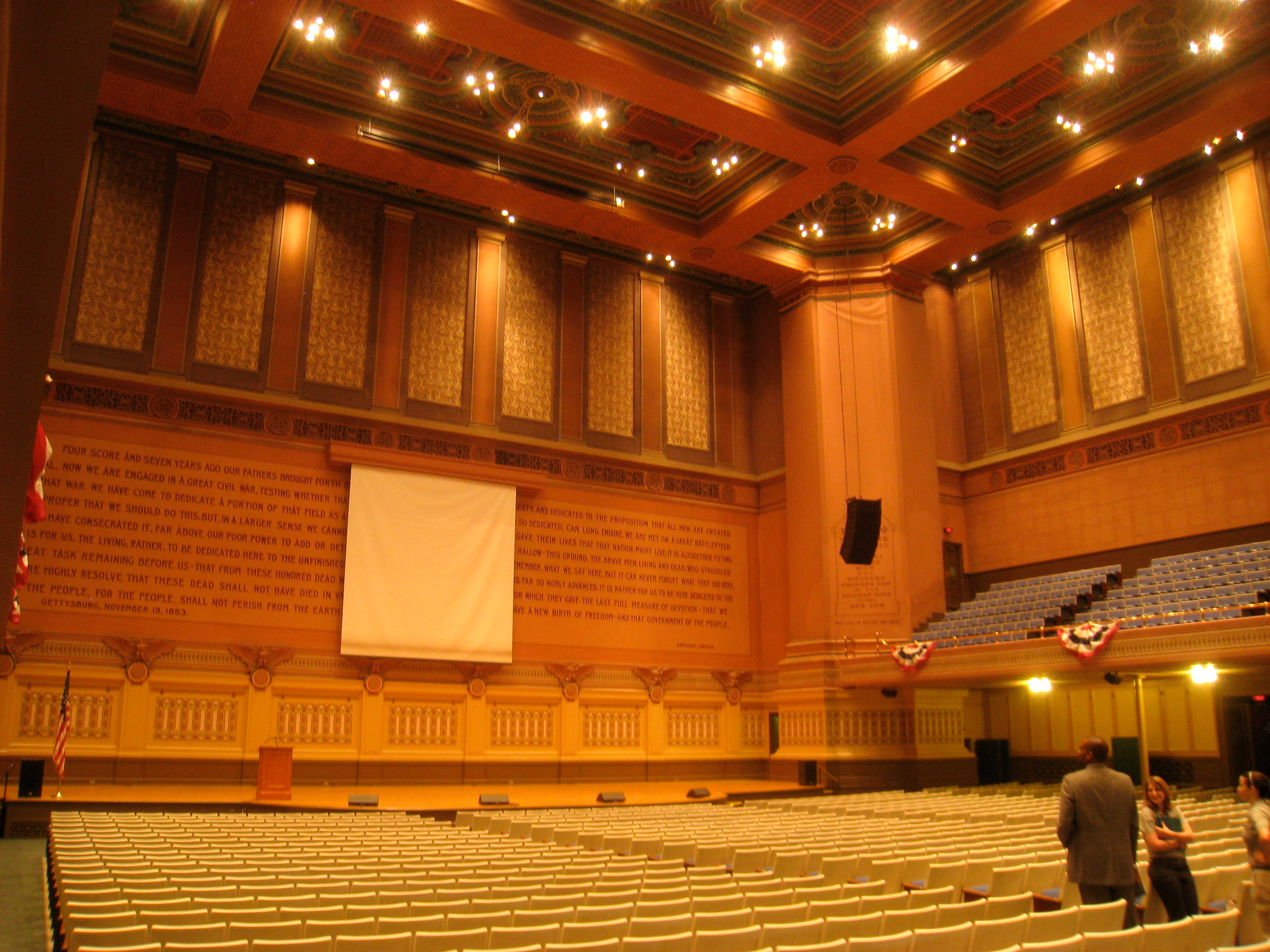
The 2,300-seat auditorium, which includes a stage backdropped by the Gettysburg Address, holds events and concerts throughout the year.

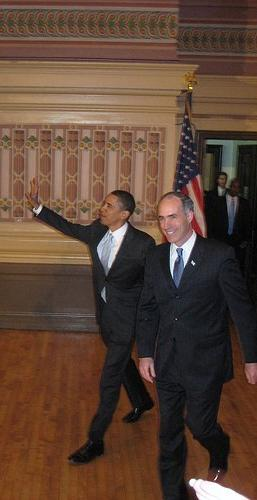
Barack Obama with Senator Bob Casey, Jr. in the auditorium in 2008.

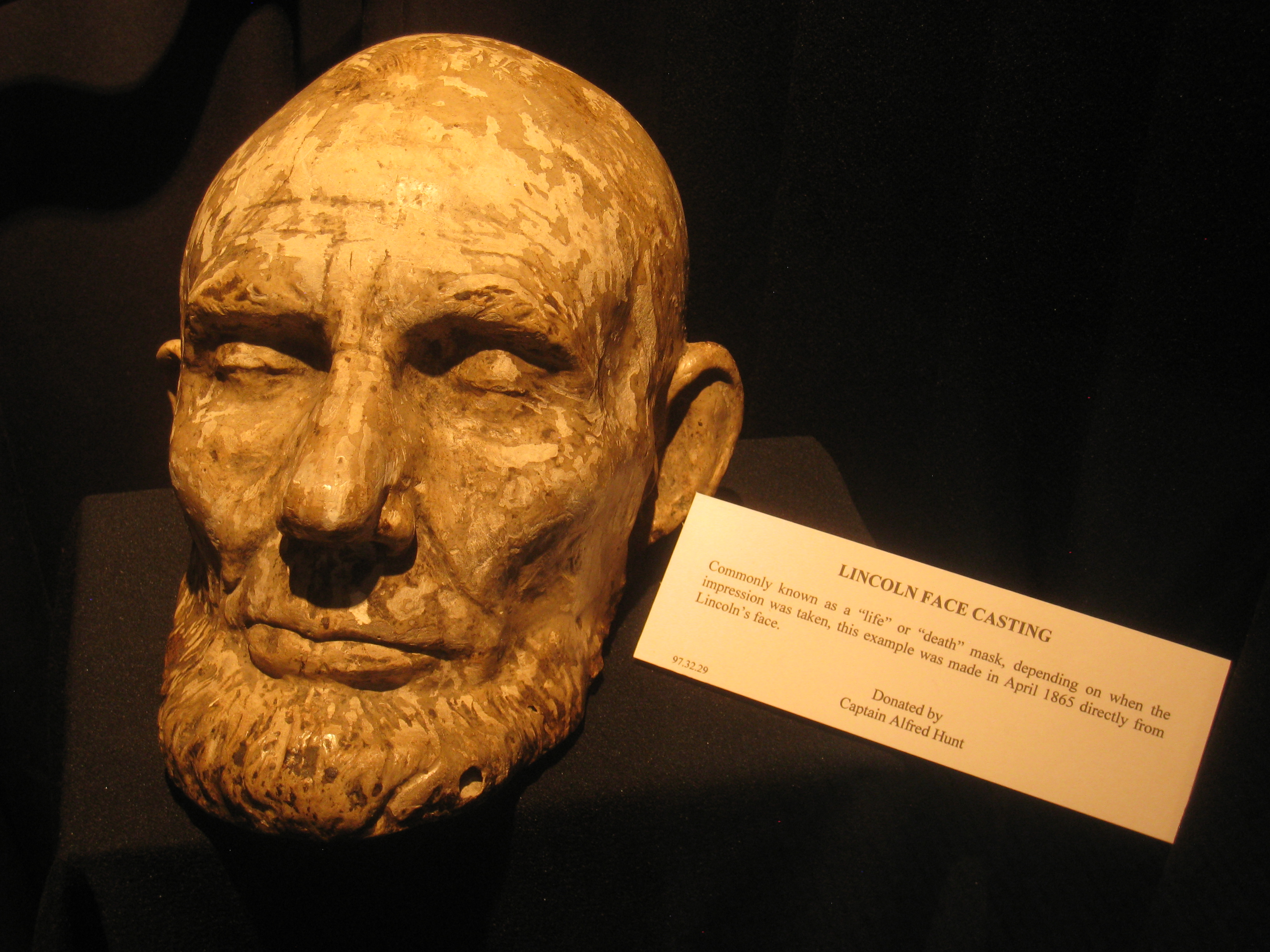
A life mask of Abraham Lincoln on display in the museum

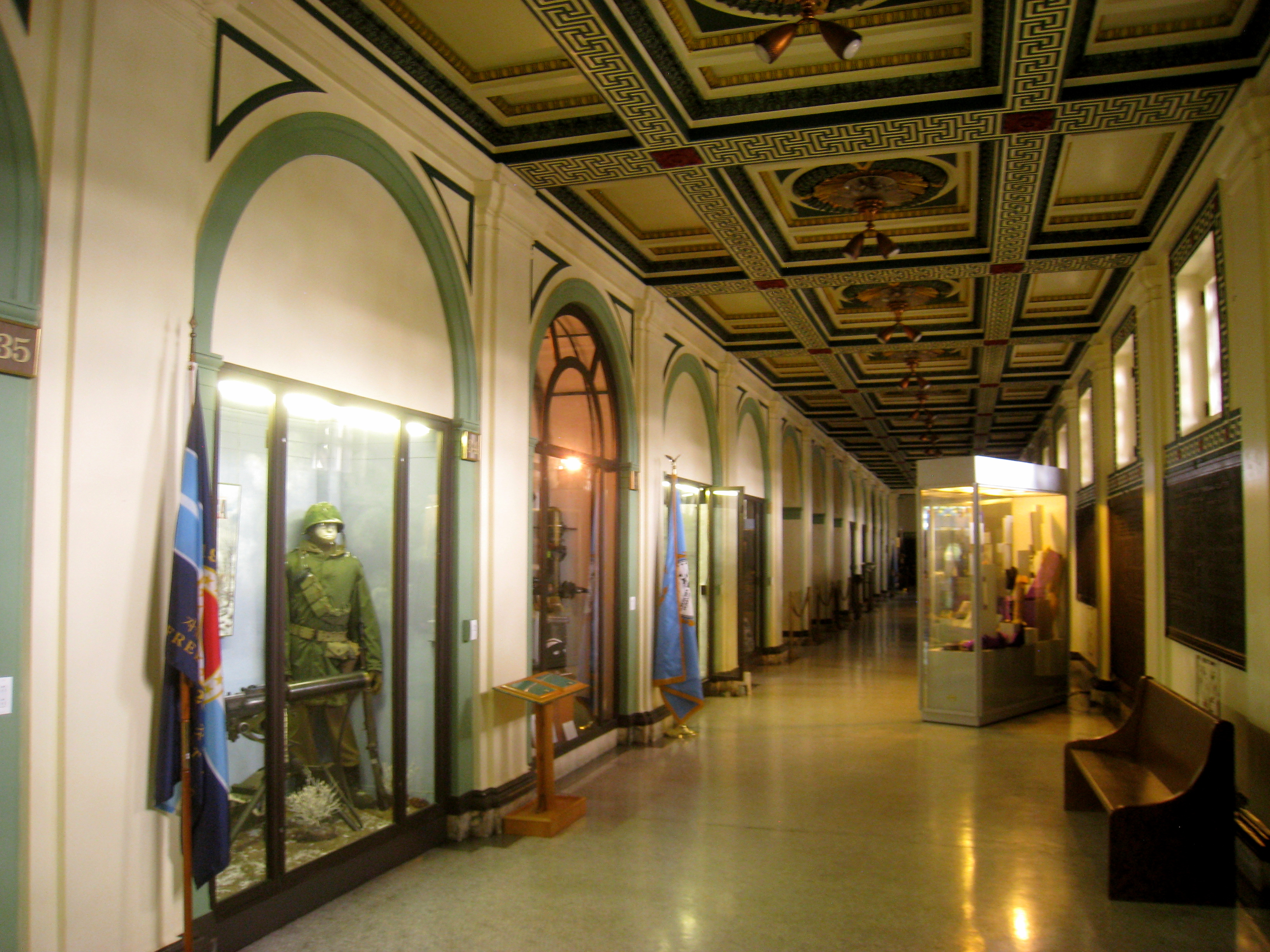
Interior hallway with military uniforms and equipment on display

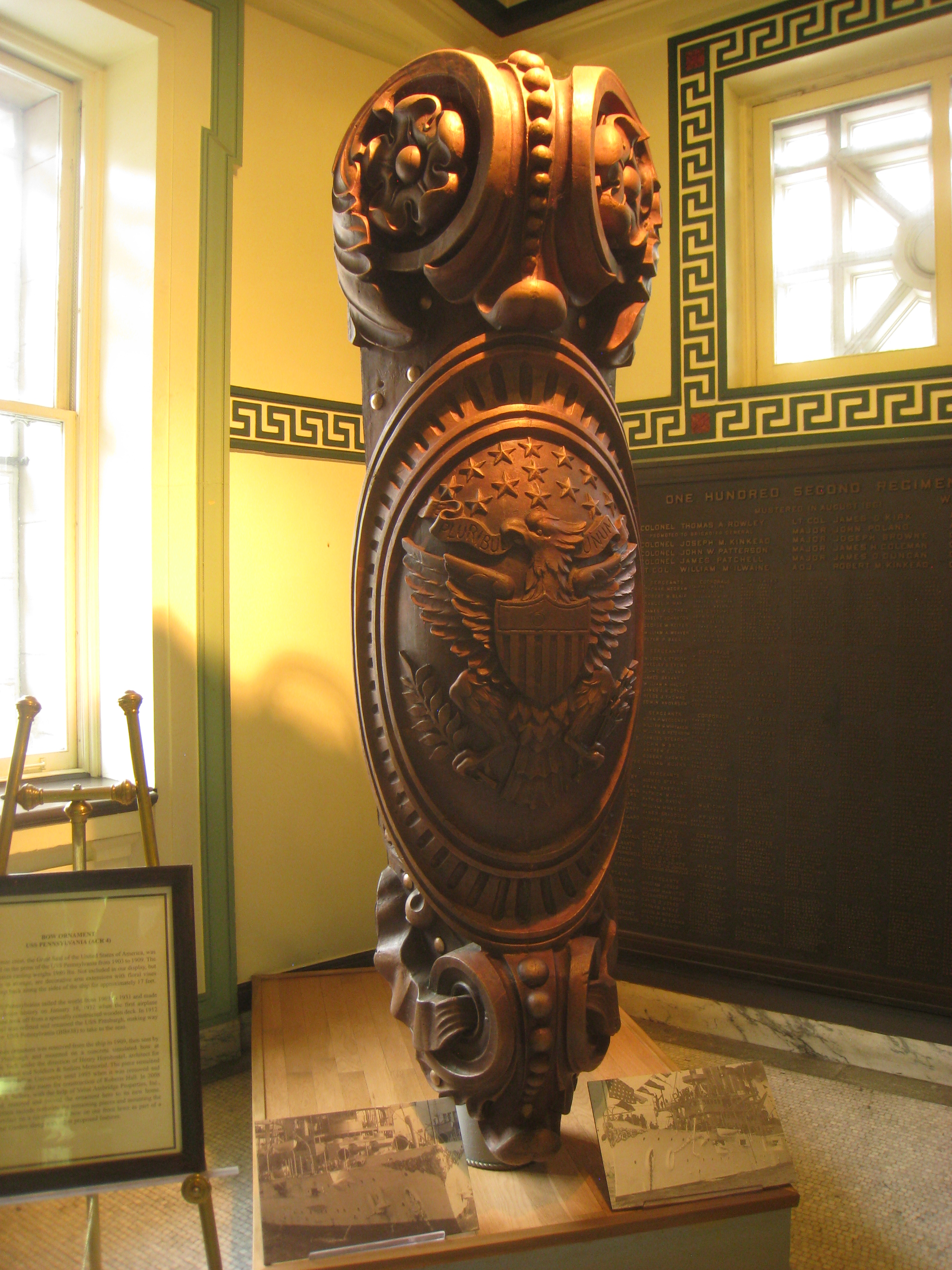
USS Pennsylvania bow ornament
