= Spirit of the American Doughboy =

Statue by E. M. Viquesney

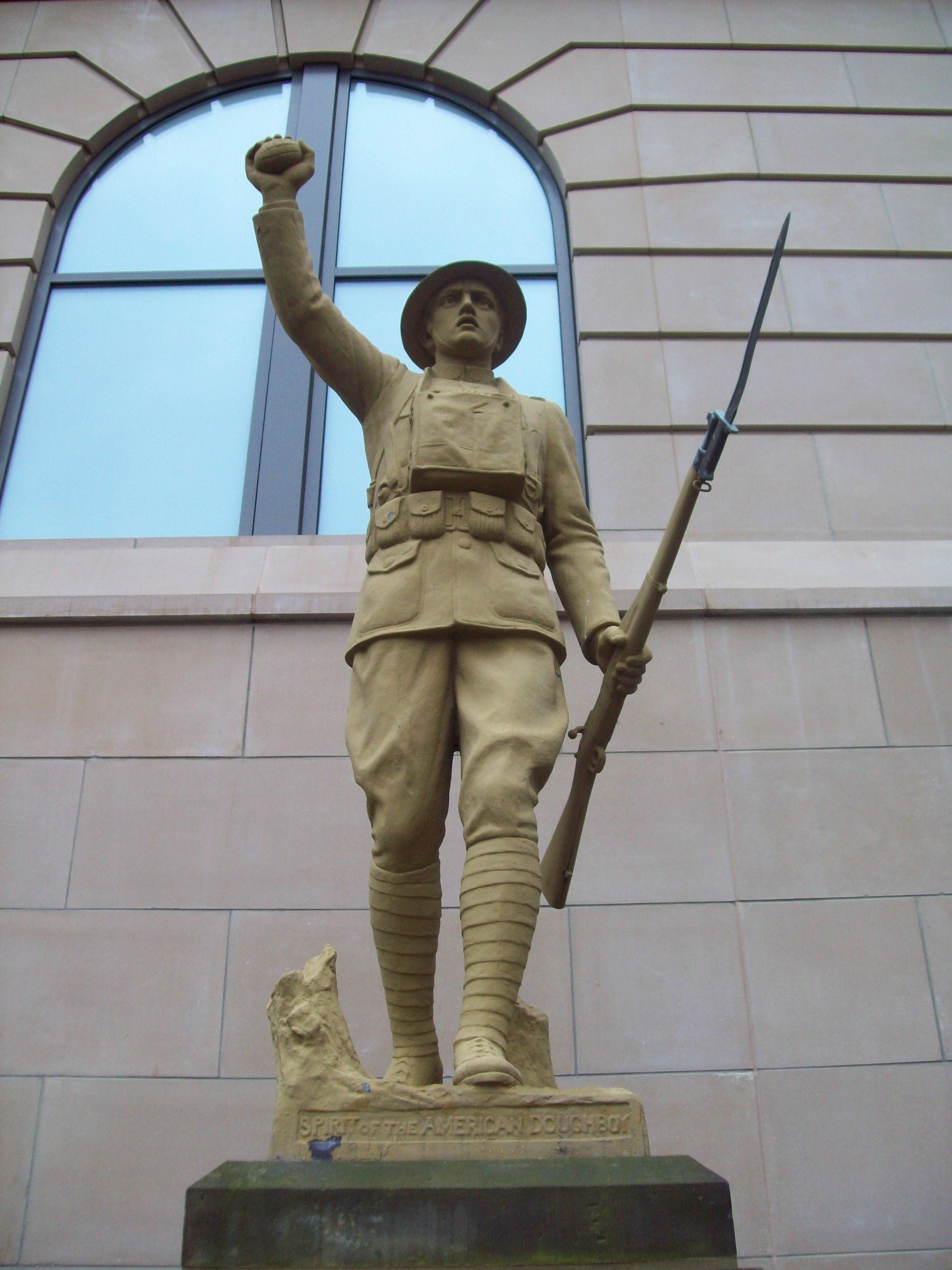
Doughboy in Akron, Ohio

The Spirit of the American Doughboy is a pressed copper sculpture by E. M. Viquesney, designed to honor the veterans and casualties of World War I. Mass-produced during the 1920s and 1930s for communities throughout the United States, the statue's design was the most popular of its kind, spawning a wave of collectible miniatures and related memorabilia as well as numerous copies by other artists. Its title is often shortened to The Doughboy.

== Memorials ==
The statue depicts a doughboy walking through shattered tree stumps strung with barbed wire, his rifle in his left hand and his right hand held high above his head, clutching a hand grenade. The aggressive design and affordability of the statue made it extremely popular, and more than 150 copies of it were created for municipal memorials across the nation. The Smithsonian American Art Museum currently lists 159 locations. Of that number, 134 currently existing originals have been independently authenticated, and several have been identified as copies by other artists (notably Over the Top by John Paulding). Viquesney's actual brochures quoted a figure of over 300 by the late 1930s, claiming at least one in every state of the Union, but this is believed to be an inflated figure.

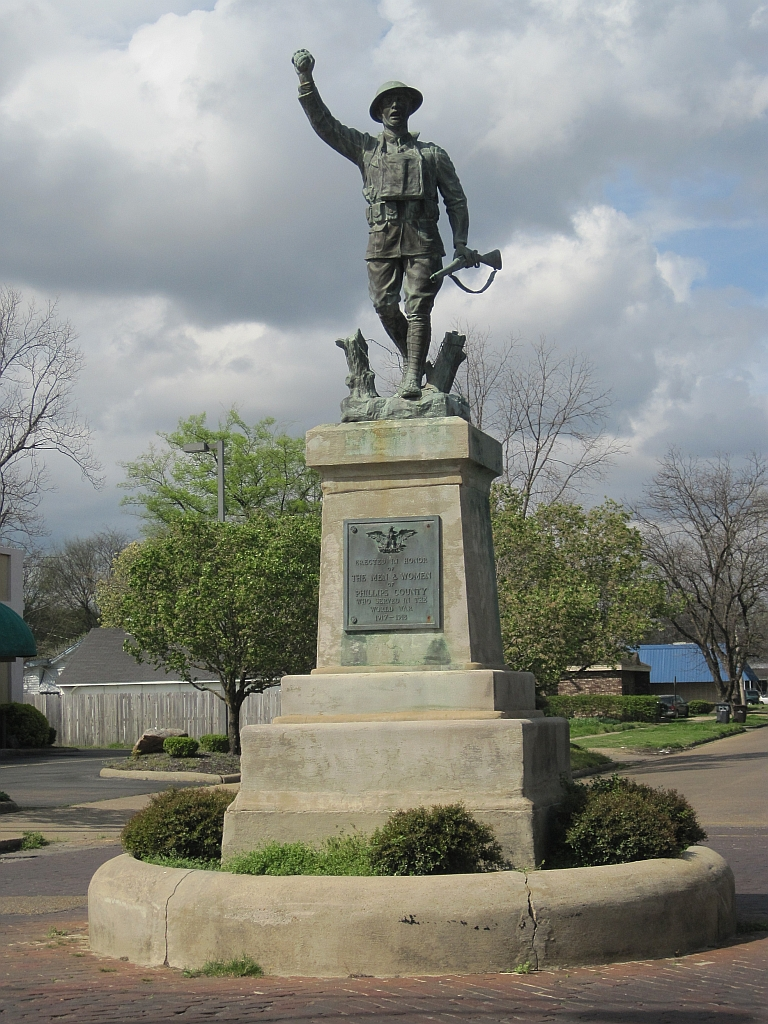
In Helena, Arkansas

The statues are installed in cemeteries, town squares, and parks, outside museums, on courthouse lawns, and in many other types of places. At least two of the statues—both in Arkansas—are individually listed on the National Register of Historic Places; one is in Helena and one is in Fort Smith.

The first installation of a Doughboy statue was at Furman University in Greenville, South Carolina—but that statue was not the first one which had been produced. In 1921, Viquesney was living in Americus, Georgia, when he had completed his original Doughboy. That first statue traveled by train all across the United States on a promotional tour, so prospective buyers could see the statue at first hand. When the statue had arrived in Nashville, Georgia, where it was to be permanently installed, the Berrien County authorities did not want to put the statue on display until they had fully paid for the tall base they had purchased. So, the first Doughboy to have been completed was only the second to have been installed. (During a delay before that statue's formal dedication, twenty-five other Doughboys across the nation were dedicated, although the statue in Viquesney's hometown of Spencer, Indiana, was not dedicated until May 29, 1927).

In 1998, Sarasota, Florida—which had never had a Doughboy statue—commissioned a longtime resident, sculptor Frank Colson, to create a copy for the city. Colson made another in 2002, for the city of Columbia, South Carolina. There was already a Doughboy by Viquesney in Columbia, so Colson's addition had given that city its second. Colson and his son also worked on the restoration of the Doughboy in Clearwater, Florida (and also restored its companion statue, Spirit of the American Navy).

== Statuettes ==
The statue also sparked an interior decorating fad in the 1920s. The design was so popular that Viquesney manufactured replica pot metal statuettes by the thousands. Also available were Doughboy lamps, which were made from the 12" statuettes (the Doughboy held a light bulb and lampshade in his raised hand), candlesticks, plaques, a smaller 6" version of the statuette, as well as less expensive plaster versions. The statuettes and lamps were made from 1921 to 1925 in Americus, Georgia, and continued to be produced in Spencer, Indiana until at least the late 1930s. With the passage of time and changes in fashion, many of these items were lost, broken, or discarded, making those few remaining in good condition sought after by modern collectors.

== Variations on the theme ==
Another statue, created as a companion to the Doughboy, was entitled Spirit of the American Navy. This version depicted a sailor in a working uniform holding his cover aloft in his right hand. Far less popular than the Doughboy, only seven were made. All the known Navy statues are installed as part of a set along with a Doughboy statue, or occur nearby, as one of each at the ends of a bridge. Another version, holding a large artillery shell with both hands instead of waving his cap, appears in a 1926 Friedley-Voshardt catalog. The only stone version of the Spirit of the American Navy is found in Crowell, Texas according to a November 2, 2011 article by Daniel Walker in The Vernon Daily Record.

The Smithsonian lists only six under the correct title (the seventh being listed along with the Doughboy at Kingman, Arizona). One, located in Palatka, Florida, is actually a different version of the statue said to have been created by sculptor Ray Fernandez, although no reference to any sculptor by that name exists in either the Smithsonian Art Inventories Catalogue or the AskART.com database. Viquesney's 1936 list shows "2 Doughboys, 2 Sailors", reinforcing the likelihood that Viquesney's "2+2" brochure claim was a typo, since all four statues (the two "standard" Doughboys, the Sailor, and a variant design Doughboy), were all dedicated at Palatka on November 11, 1927, according to newspaper articles. A Smithsonian reference to the Palatka variant Doughboy states that it may possibly have been sculpted by Gutzon Borglum. There is no proof of this, although Viquesney's self-written obituary boasts that "he knew Borglum".

Other variants were designed by Viquesney to depict different doughboy poses, but very few got past the drawing stage and none were ever realized at full scale. The largest variant actually known to be by Viquesney is a unique three-foot memorial in Lakemore, Ohio, also listed as The Spirit of the Doughboy by the Smithsonian. It was copyrighted in 1930 and dedicated in 1938. No full-sized Viquesney doughboys in any pose other than the original have been confirmed to exist. New information and photographs confirm this piece is actually titled Resting Doughboy and was copyrighted in 1936.

== See also ==
- American Doughboy Bringing Home Victory (1932) by Alonzo Victor Lewis
- The Doughboy (1924) by Humberto Pendretti
