= E. M. Viquesney =

American sculptor (1876–1946)

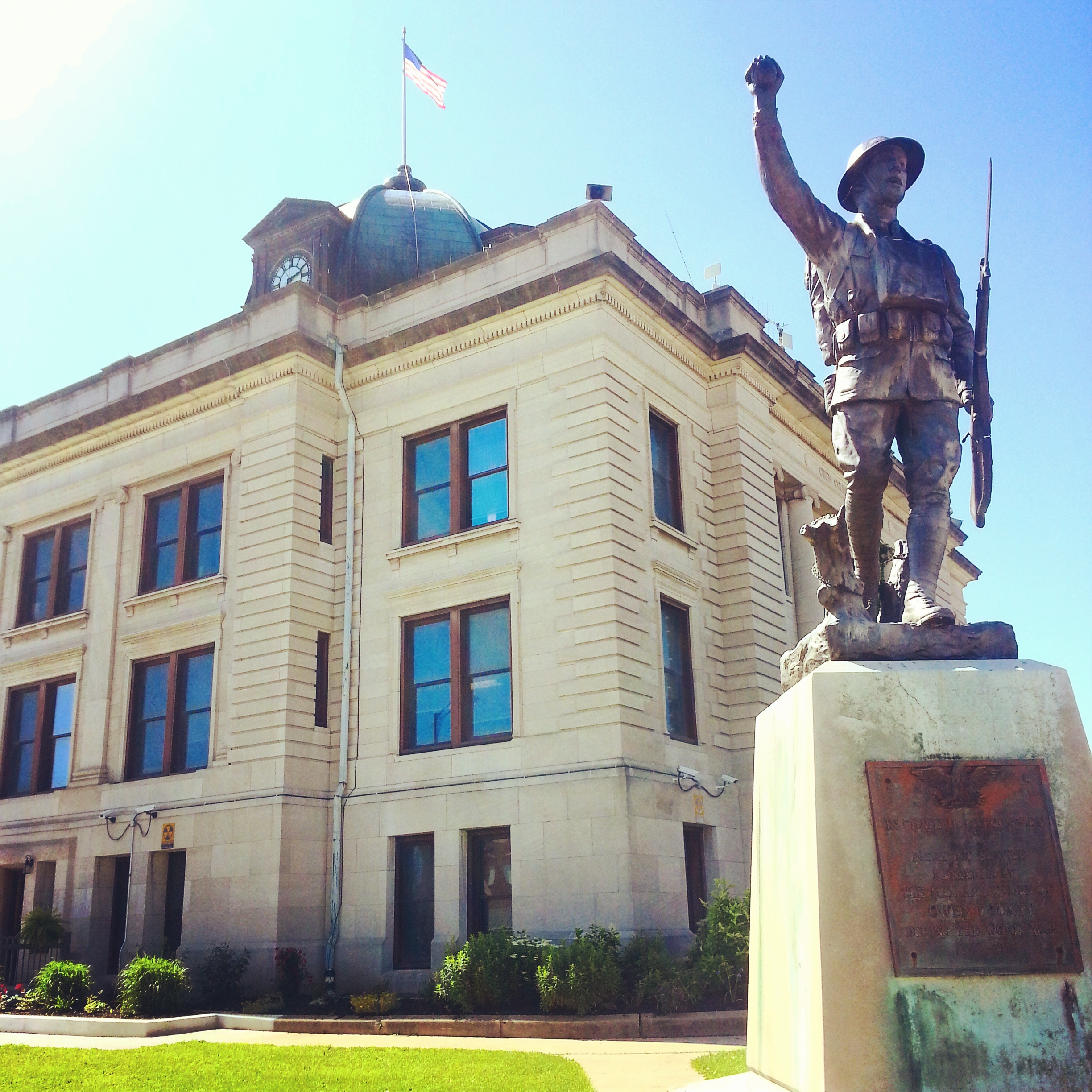
Spirit of the American Doughboy, Owen County Courthouse, Spencer, Indiana

Ernest Moore Viquesney (August 5, 1876 – October 4, 1946) was an American sculptor best known for his popular World War I monument Spirit of the American Doughboy.

== Biography ==
"Dick" Viquesney was the son of French-born stone mason Alfred P. Viquesney and his third wife, Ohio-born Jane Lehman. Viquesney was born in Spencer, Indiana, where he lived for much of his life.

He served in the Spanish–American War, during which he was stationed at Pensacola, Florida. He is presumed to have learned stone-carving from his father, and placed a "Situations Wanted" advertisement in a trade magazine at the end of 1903:

A sober, competent marble letterer and tracer desires a steady position with a reliable firm after Jan. 1; 12 years experience, competent draftsman, saleman and foreman; state wages and hours. E. M. Viquesney, Spencer, Ind.

Viquesney wrote a manual on stonecutting: The Pneumatic Tool: Its Care and Used (1904), which was published as a series of articles in The Monumental News, then republished in book form. He invented a machine to moisten and attach postage stamps to letters.

Viquesney married Cora Barnes in 1904, and the following year began work as a designer and carver for C. J. Clark Monuments in Americus, Georgia. He designed mortuary monuments, and executed work on monuments at Andersonville National Cemetery. He left Clark Monuments by 1909, to become designer for the Georgia Granite and Marble Company in Rome, Georgia. For Georgia Granite, he designed the Women of the Confederacy Monument (1909–1910), for the city's Myrtle Hill Cemetery.

For Charles G. Blake Company, Viquesney designed the Sedgwick County Soldier's and Sailor's Monument (1911–1913), in Wichita, Kansas. Sculptor Frederick Hibbard modeled the four bronze military figures, and W. H. Mullins Company provided the hammered copper Goddess of Victory atop the monument's dome.

=== Peace Memorial (unbuilt) ===
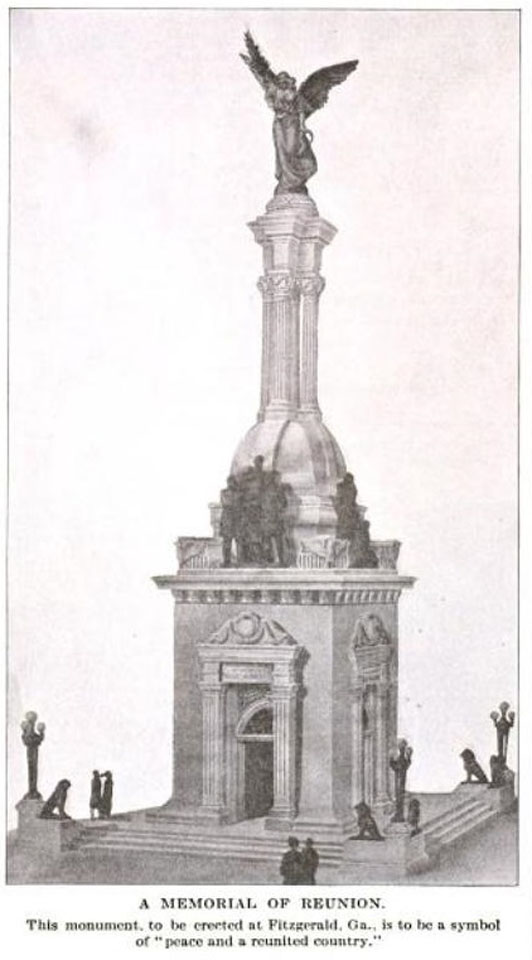

In 1913, as the 50th anniversary of the end of the Civil War approached, The Blue and the Gray Association of America proposed that a Peace Memorial be built in Fitzgerald, Georgia, the town where Confederate President Jefferson Davis had hidden from Union troops. Viquesney's design featured a square stone pavilion with bronze sculpture groups above the cornice, and a stone tower crowned by a bronze goddess of Peace.

At the base, the monument is 56 feet square, while its height is approximately 125 feet. The four granite steps leading from the ground to the entrance of the monument typify the four years of war. There are four doors, the art glass over each door bearing an inscription – that on the north to the Grand Army of the Republic, and that on the south to the Southern Veterans, and those on the east and west to the Daughters of the Confederacy and the Woman's Relief Corps.
Inside the monument there will be life-size statues of Jefferson Davis and Abraham Lincoln facing each other on opposite sides, and glass cases for war relics will occupy corresponding positions on the two opposite sides.
The immense bronze statues over the north entrance represent Lee and Grant shaking hands, and behind them is the Spirit of Peace. Over the door on the south will be a Northern and Southern soldier supporting an American Flag. The group on the west portrays Opportunity and Progress, while on the east the bronze statues represent Prosperity. The bronze work for the monument will be executed by the well-known sculptor, Frank C. [sic] Hibbard, of Chicago.

Viquesney's Peace Memorial was never built, perhaps because of its $150,000 estimated cost. Fitzgerald, Georgia is home to the Blue and Gray Museum, and nearby Irwinville (where Davis was actually captured), is home to the Jefferson Davis Memorial Historic Site.

=== Spirit of the American Doughboy ===
Viquesney returned to Americus, Georgia in February 1916 as chief designer for the Schneider Marble Works, the home town rival of Clark Monuments. While working for Schneider, he designed, but never actually sculpted, The Spirit of the American Doughboy in 1920. The sheet bronze sculpture seen across the United States was actually sculpted by the in-house Head of Sculpture Department at Friedley-Voshardt Company, Paul Mohrmann.

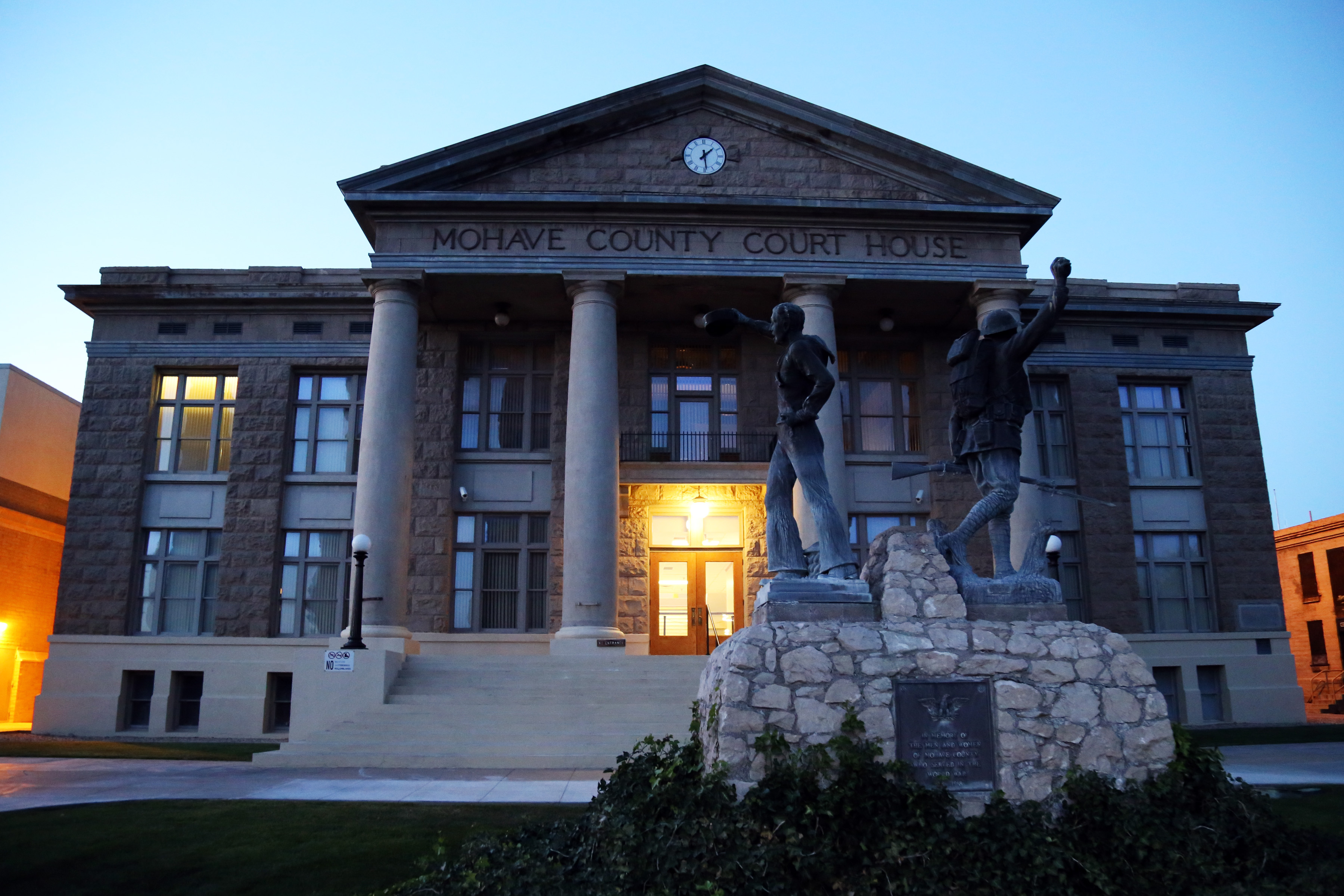
Spirit of the American Navy (1927) and Spirit of the American Doughboy (1921), Mohave County Court House, Kingman, Arizona

The original Doughboy statue was completed in early 1921 and erected in the middle of Marion Avenue just behind its current location in late July or August 1921, but was left veiled until late 1923 when payment for the sculpture and impressive base was finally received. Hundreds of mass-produced replicas were installed in front of American city halls and courthouses and in public parks and cemeteries. The exact number may never be determined, but there are approximately 140 extant today, in 38 different states. A total of 153 are listed in the SIRIS database, though some have been destroyed by weather, accidents, or vandalism, and some, unfortunately, are listed in error, and usually turn out to be John Paulding's very similar statue "Over the Top".

"Dick" and Cora Viquesney moved back to Spencer, Indiana in 1922. He founded his own business, the Imp-O-Luck Company, manufacturing statuettes and miniatures, with the Imp-O-Luck, a Leprechaun-based good luck item becoming his biggest seller. It came in several forms, including statuettes, rings, tie pins, keychain fobs, ashtrays, and incense burners. In the first year of production alone, 1924, 100,000 Imp-O-Luck items were logged by the Spencer, IN, post office. The Imp-O-Luck line was phased out in 1929.

However, this left Viquesney wealthy enough to buy out his business partner Walter Rylander's interest in the Doughboy in 1926. Viquesney had sold his entire interest in his Doughboy to Rylander in 1922, probably to raise cash to settle against a copyright infringement lawsuit brought against him by American Art Bronze Foundry of Chicago, IL. In 1927, he modeled a companion piece – Spirit of the American Navy, depicting a young sailor. It was never as popular as his "Spirit of the American Doughboy", selling only 7 copies.

By 1928, Viquesney's business was profitable enough for him to build a movie palace in his home town, the Tivoli Theatre, which he subsequently lost in 1932 due to competition from another theater in town and another lawsuit initiated against him for defaulting on unpaid bills.

=== Later life ===
Cora died in 1933, and Viquesney modeled a life-size figure, The Unveiling, to mark her grave. Urban legend has it that Viquesney's soon-to-be second wife, Elizabeth "Betty" Sadler, was the model, but this has never been documented.

He mass-produced at least one World War II Army monument (if you can call a total of one stone and 4 metal statues a "mass production"), Spirit of the Fighting Yank, and worked on an updated Navy monument.

Elizabeth died in August 1946, and Viquesney committed suicide two months later. He was buried with both his wives at Riverside Cemetery in Spencer, Indiana.

== Selected works ==
- Women of the Confederacy Monument (1909–1910), Myrtle Hill Cemetery, Rome, Georgia, Georgia Granite and Marble Co.
  - Monument to the Women of the South (1911), 688 Poplar Street, Macon, Georgia. Same design with different details
- Sedgwick County Soldier's and Sailor's Monument (1911–1913), Wichita, Kansas
- Spirit of the American Doughboy (1920–1921)
- The Infantry Trophy (1923), created for the U.S. Infantry Association
- Imp-O-Luck (1923), statuette of a leprechaun
- Spirit of the American Navy (1927)
- The Spirit of the Skies – Bust of Charles Lindbergh (1927)
- Bust of Knute Rockne (1931)
- The Unveiling (1934–1935), Viquesney plot, Riverside Cemetery, Spencer, Indiana
- The American's Creed (1936–1939), bronze relief plaque, Soldiers Memorial Pavilion, Riverside Cemetery, Spencer, Indiana
  - Spirit of the Flag (1936–1937), is the central figure of the plaque
- Lincoln as an Indiana Boy (1938), statuette
- Spirit of the Fighting Yank (1943–1944), Monroe County Courthouse, Bloomington, Indiana, carved in limestone by Harry D. Donato
  - Zinc replicas of Spirit of the American Doughboy (1934) and Spirit of the Fighting Yank (1943) stand side by side in front of the VFW chapter in Oil City, Pennsylvania.
- The Navy Again at Sea (1940s), statuette
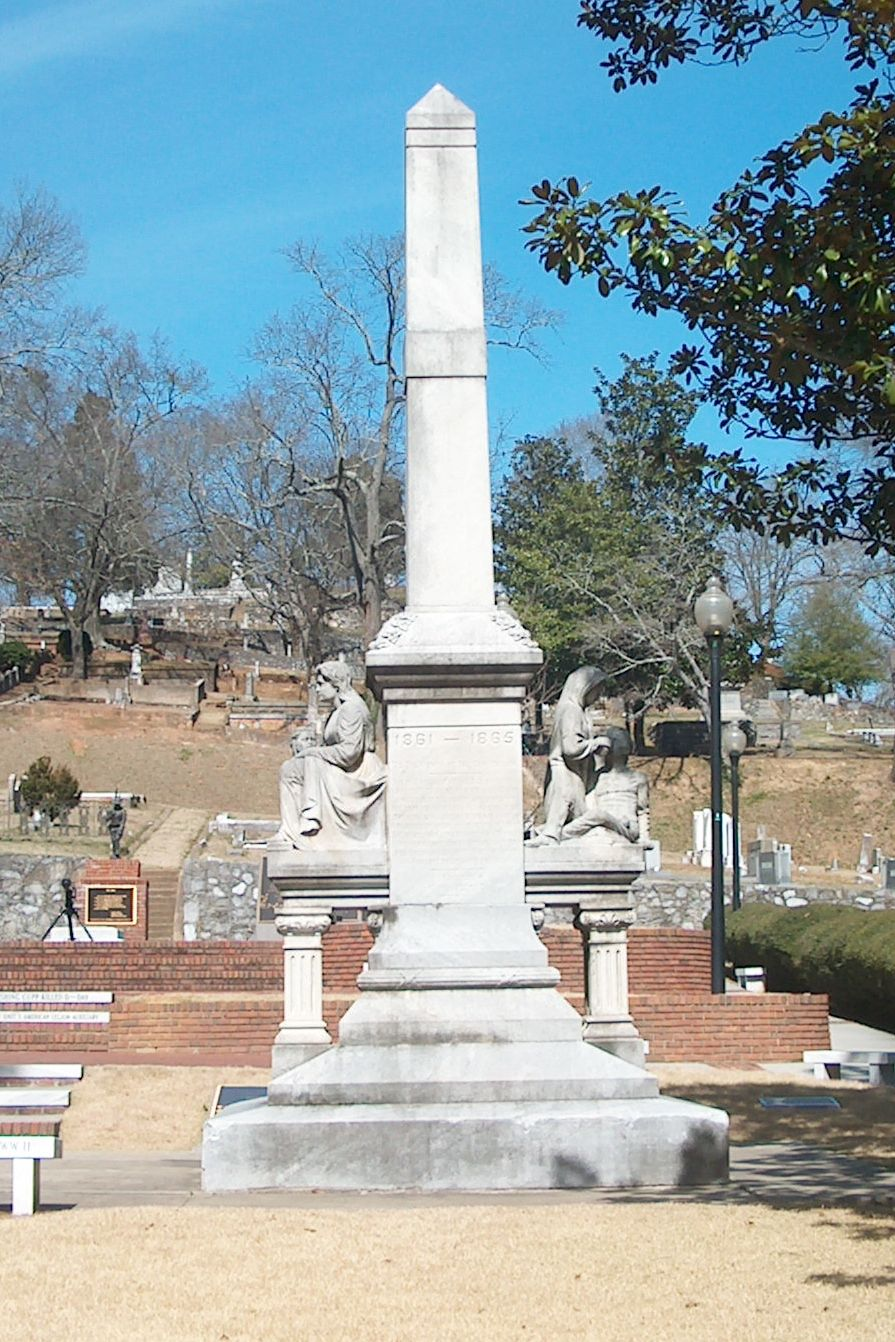
Women of the Confederacy Monument (1909–1910), Rome, Georgia

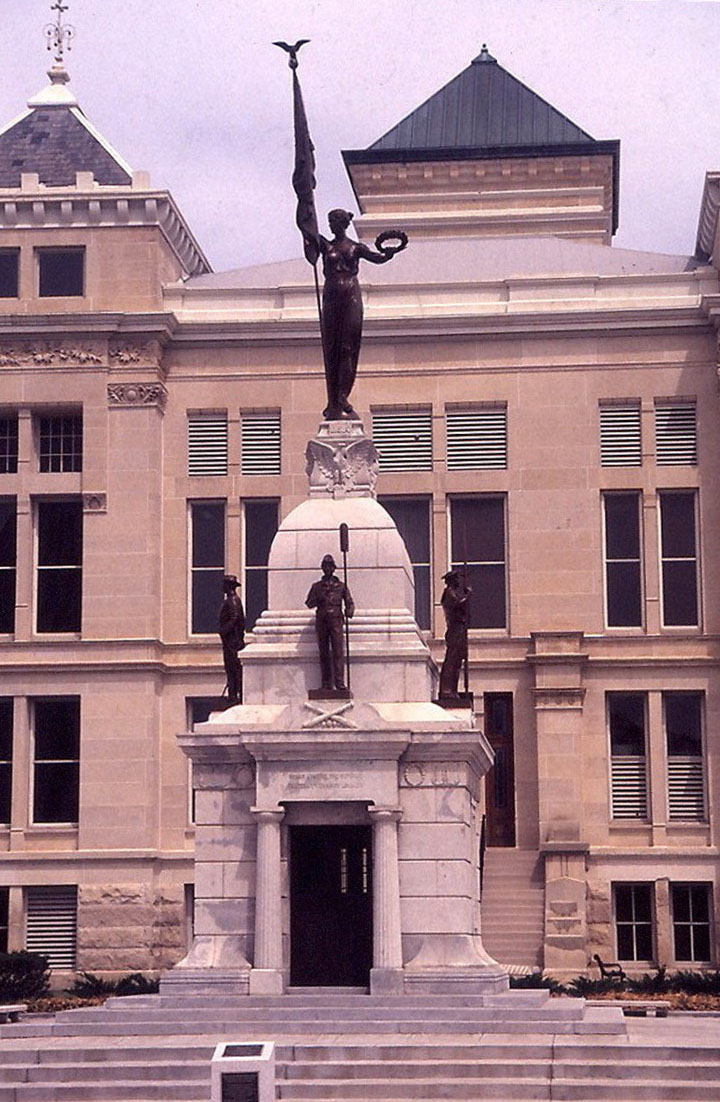
Sedgwick County Soldiers and Sailors Monument (1911–1913), Wichita, Kansas

== Legacy ==
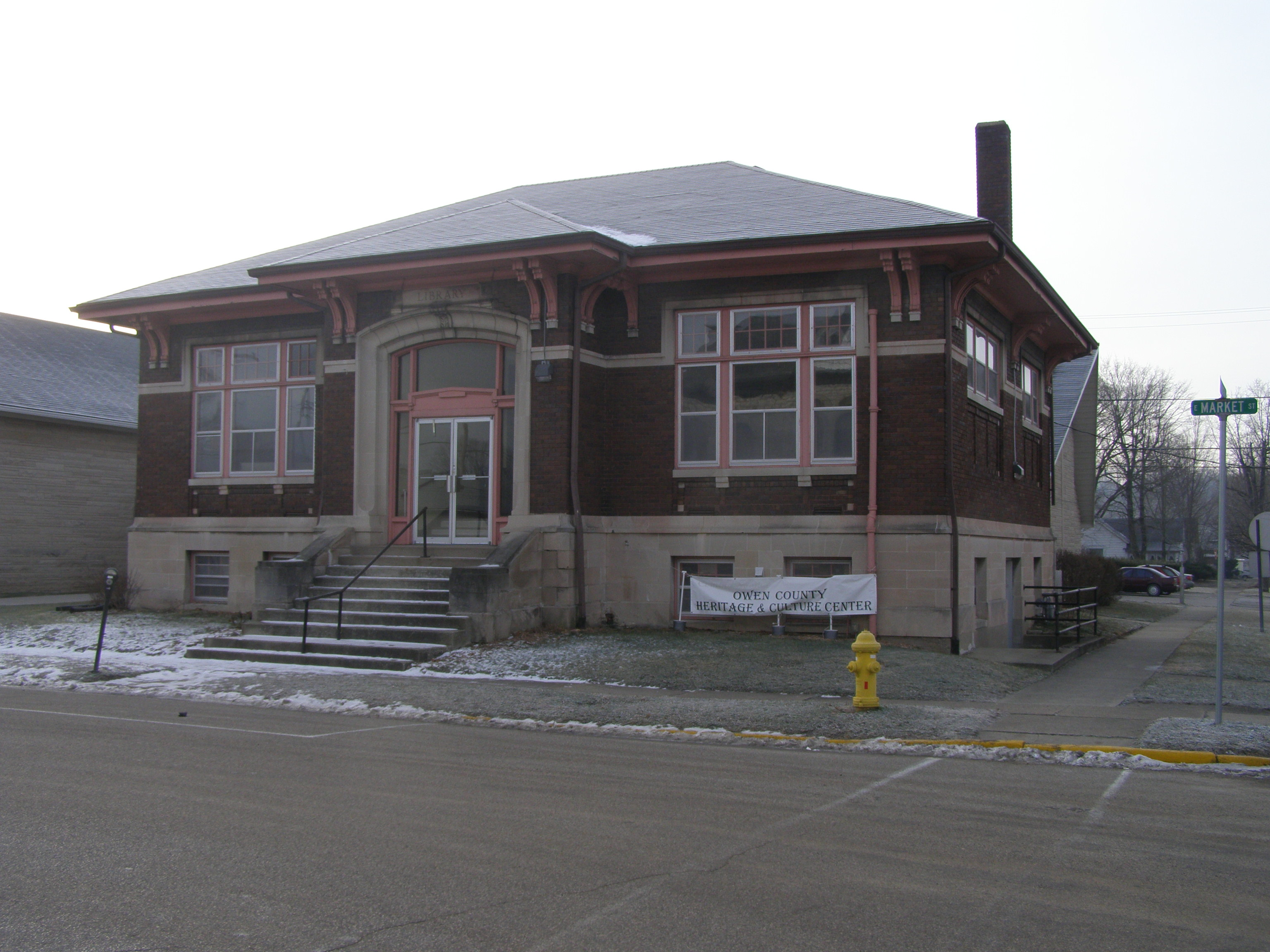
Owen County Heritage and Cultural Center

The Owen County Heritage and Culture Center, formerly the Spencer Carnegie Library, features a small museum of E. M. Viquesney's statuettes and miniatures.
