= Spirit of the American Navy =

Monuments created by E. M. Viquesney

Spirit of the American Navy was a World War I monument created by sculptor E. M. Viquesney in 1927. It was intended to be a companion piece to his very popular, Spirit of the American Doughboy, but never attained that stature, occurring in only seven known locations, with an eighth held in private ownership.

== Editions ==
Spirit of the American Navy (the United States)
- Memorial Park Bridge, Palatka, Florida 1927 (variant version holding artillery shell instead of waving cap)
- Clearwater Memorial Causeway Park, Clearwater, Florida 1927
- Mohave County Courthouse, Kingman, Arizona 1928
- Memorial Park, Fort Wayne, Indiana 1928
- Granite, Oklahoma, 1929
- Hobart, Oklahoma 1929
- Crowell, Texas 1932 (stone version)
- Naperville, Illinois; purchased from a private owner in Pentwater, Michigan in 2013, and dedicated in Burlington Square Park on October 13, 2013, the 238th birthday of the United States Navy.
