= 2018 Alabama Senate election =

- November 6, 2018

All 35 seats in the Alabama Senate 18 seats needed for a majority
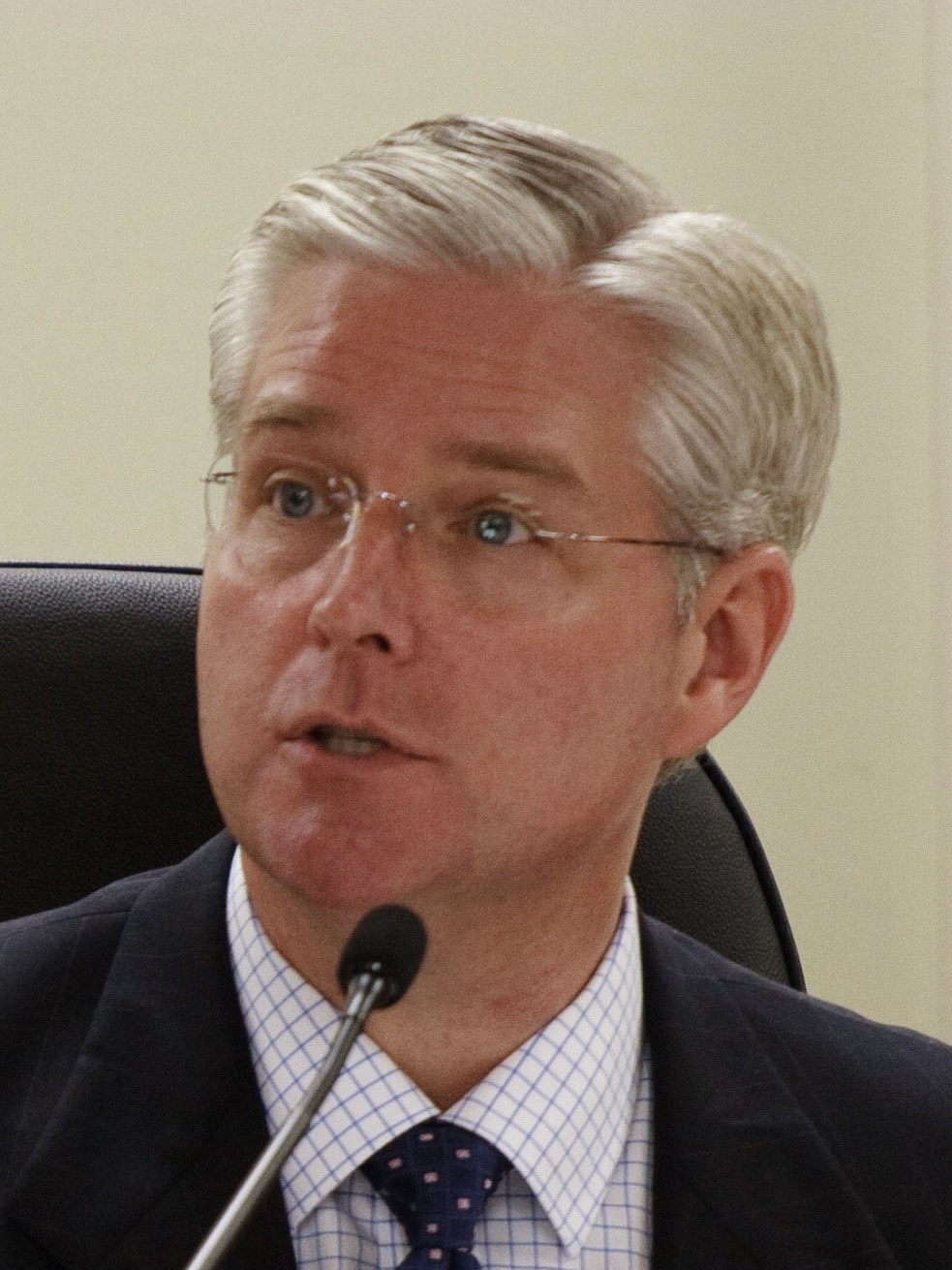

	Majority party	Minority party
Leader	Greg Reed	Billy Beasley
Party	Republican	Democratic
Leader's seat	5th	28th
Last election	26+1 (Note: Independent Harri Anne Smith from Senate District 29 is an Independent who caucuses with the Republicans.)	8
Seats before	26+1	8
Seats won	27	8
Seat change	Steady	Steady
Popular vote	945,469	527,696
Percentage	62.79%	35.05%
Swing	▲1.19%	▼0.14%
- Results: Republican gain Republican hold Democratic hold
President pro tempore before election
Del Marsh
Republican
Elected President pro tempore
Del Marsh
Republican

The 2018 Alabama Senate elections took place on November 3, 2018, as part of the 2018 United States elections. Alabama voters elected state senators in all 35 of the state's Senate districts. State senators serve four-year terms in the Alabama Senate.

A primary election on June 5, 2018, and a runoff election on July 17, 2018, determined which candidates would appear on the November 6 general election ballot. Primary election results can be obtained from the Alabama Secretary of State's website.

Following the 2014 state Senate elections, Republicans maintained effective control of the House with a 27-seat majority—26 Republican members and onw independent who caucuses with the Republicans. Democrats held eight seats following the 2014 elections.

To claim control of the chamber from Republicans, the Democrats would have needed to gain 10 Senate seats.

The election resulted in the Republican Party holding all previously held seats and taking a seat previously held by an independent who caucused with the Republicans, leading to no effective shift in control of the chamber. The Republicans also gained slightly in the popular vote compared to the 2014 elections.

== Summary ==
District	Incumbent	Party	Elected Senator	Party
1st	Tim Melson	Republican	Tim Melson	Republican
2nd	Bill Holtzclaw	Republican	Tom Butler	Republican
3rd	Arthur Orr	Republican	Arthur Orr	Republican
4th	Paul Bussman	Republican	Garlan Gudger	Republican
5th	Greg Reed	Republican	Greg Reed	Republican
6th	Larry Stutts	Republican	Larry Stutts	Republican
7th	Paul Sanford	Republican	Sam Givhan	Republican
8th	Steve Livingston	Republican	Steve Livingston	Republican
9th	Clay Scofield	Republican	Clay Scofield	Republican
10th	Phil Williams	Republican	Andrew Jones	Republican
11th	Jim McClendon	Republican	Jim McClendon	Republican
12th	Del Marsh	Republican	Del Marsh	Republican
13th	Gerald Dial	Republican	Randy Price	Republican
14th	Cam Ward	Republican	Cam Ward	Republican
15th	Mark Slade Blackwell	Republican	Dan Roberts	Republican
16th	J. T. Waggoner	Republican	J. T. Waggoner	Republican
17th	Shay Shelnutt	Republican	Shay Shelnutt	Republican
18th	Rodger Smitherman	Democrat	Rodger Smitherman	Democrat
19th	Priscilla Dunn	Democrat	Priscilla Dunn	Democrat
20th	Linda Coleman-Madison	Democrat	Linda Coleman-Madison	Democrat
21st	Gerald H. Allen	Republican	Gerald H. Allen	Republican
22nd	Greg Albritton	Republican	Greg Albritton	Republican
23rd	Hank Sanders	Democrat	Malika Sanders-Fortier	Democrat
24th	Bobby D. Singleton	Democrat	Bobby D. Singleton	Democrat
25th	Dick Brewbaker	Republican	Will Barfoot	Republican
26th	David Burkette	Democrat	David Burkette	Democrat
27th	Tom Whatley	Republican	Tom Whatley	Republican
28th	Billy Beasley	Democrat	Billy Beasley	Democrat
29th	Harri Anne Smith	Independent (Note: Sen. Smith is an Independent who caucuses with the Republicans.)	Donnie Chesteen	Republican
30th	Clyde Chambliss	Republican	Clyde Chambliss	Republican
31st	Jimmy Holley	Republican	Jimmy Holley	Republican
32nd	Trip Pittman	Republican	Chris Elliott	Republican
33rd	Vivian Davis Figures	Democrat	Vivian Davis Figures	Democrat
34th	Rusty Glover	Republican	Jack Williams	Republican
35th	Bill Hightower	Republican	David Sessions	Republican

== Closest races ==
District	Winner	Margin
District 2	Republican	8.986%
District 6	Republican	1.988%
District 7	Republican	10.485%
District 27	Republican	18.171%

== Predictions ==
Source	Ranking	As of
Governing	Safe R	October 8, 2018

== Results by district ==
=== District 1 ===
Election results, district 1
Party	Candidate	Votes	%
Republican	Tim Melson (incumbent)	33,141	67.643
Democratic	Caroline Self	15,830	32.310
Independent	Write-in	23	0.047
Total votes		48,994	100.0
Republican hold			

=== District 2 ===
Election results, district 2
Party	Candidate	Votes	%
Republican	Tom Butler	31,997	54.627
Democratic	Amy Wasyluka	26,911	45.641
Independent	Write-in	54	0.091
Total votes		58,962	100.0
Republican hold			

=== District 3 ===
Election results, district 3
Party	Candidate	Votes	%
Republican	Arthur Orr (incumbent)	37,295	97.335
Independent	Write-in	1,021	2.665
Total votes		38,316	100.0
Republican hold			

=== District 4 ===
Election results, district 4
Party	Candidate	Votes	%
Republican	Garlan Gudger	39,817	99.146
Independent	Write-in	343	0.854
Total votes		40,160	100.0
Republican hold			

=== District 5 ===
Election results, district 5
Party	Candidate	Votes	%
Republican	Greg Reed (incumbent)	42,404	98.842
Independent	Write-in	497	1.158
Total votes		42,901	100.0
Republican hold			

=== District 6 ===
Election results, district 6
Party	Candidate	Votes	%
Republican	Larry Stutts (incumbent)	22,683	50.834
Democratic	Johnny Mack Morrow	21,796	48.846
Independent	Write-in	143	0.320
Total votes		44,622	100.0
Republican hold			

=== District 7 ===
Election results, district 7
Party	Candidate	Votes	%
Republican	Sam Givhan	30,080	55.217
Democratic	Deborah Barros	24,363	44.722
Independent	Write-in	33	0.061
Total votes		54,476	100.0
Republican hold			

=== District 8 ===
Election results, district 8
Party	Candidate	Votes	%
Republican	Steve Livingston (incumbent)	37,913	98.327
Independent	Write-in	645	1.673
Total votes		38,558	100.0
Republican hold			

=== District 9 ===
Election results, district 9
Party	Candidate	Votes	%
Republican	Clay Scofield (incumbent)	35,192	98.572
Independent	Write-in	510	1.428
Total votes		35,702	100.0
Republican hold			

=== District 10 ===
Election results, district 10
Party	Candidate	Votes	%
Republican	Andrew Jones	25,902	60.601
Independent	Craig Ford (Note: Craig Ford was a Democratic member of the Alabama House of Representatives, but is running for the Alabama Senate as an Independent.)	16,759	39.210
Independent	Write-in	81	0.190
Total votes		42,742	100.0
Republican hold			

=== District 11 ===
Election results, district 11
Party	Candidate	Votes	%
Republican	Jim McClendon (incumbent)	36,192	75.970
Democratic	Carl Carter	11,411	23.953
Independent	Write-in	37	0.078
Total votes		47,640	100.0
Republican hold			

=== District 12 ===
Election results, district 12
Party	Candidate	Votes	%
Republican	Del Marsh (incumbent)	27,416	64.501
Democratic	Jim Williams	15,010	35.313
Independent	Write-in	79	0.186
Total votes		42,505	100.0
Republican hold			

=== District 13 ===
Election results, district 13
Party	Candidate	Votes	%
Republican	Randy Price	31,614	71.065
Democratic	Darrell Turner	12,839	28.861
Independent	Write-in	33	0.074
Total votes		44,486	100.0
Republican hold			

=== District 14 ===
Election results, district 14
Party	Candidate	Votes	%
Republican	Cam Ward (incumbent)	34,957	72.572
Democratic	Jerry McDonald	13,173	27.347
	Write-in	39	0.081
Total votes		48,169	100.0
Republican hold			

=== District 15 ===
Election results, district 15
Party	Candidate	Votes	%
Republican	Dan Roberts	44,792	97.421
Democratic	Laura Casey (withdrawn)		
Independent	Write-in	1,186	2.579
Total votes		45,978	100.0
Republican hold			

=== District 16 ===
Election results, district 16
Party	Candidate	Votes	%
Republican	Jabo Waggoner (incumbent)	37,068	62.880
Democratic	Lindsey Deckard	21,851	37.066
Independent	Write-in	32	0.054
Total votes		58,951	100.0
Republican hold			

=== District 17 ===
Election results, district 17
Party	Candidate	Votes	%
Republican	Shay Shelnutt (incumbent)	45,964	98.306
	Write-in	792	1.694
Total votes		46,756	100.0
Republican hold			

=== District 18 ===
Election results, district 18
Party	Candidate	Votes	%
Democratic	Rodger Smitherman (incumbent)	39,819	98.350
Independent	Write-in	668	1.650
Total votes		40,487	100.0
Democratic hold			

=== District 19 ===
Election results, district 19
Party	Candidate	Votes	%
Democratic	Priscilla Dunn (incumbent)	38,668	98.184
Independent	Write-in	715	1.816
Total votes		39,383	100.0
Democratic hold			

=== District 20 ===
Election results, district 20
Party	Candidate	Votes	%
Democratic	Linda Coleman-Madison (incumbent)	36,478	98.345
Independent	Write-in	614	1.655
Total votes		37,092	100.0
Democratic hold			

=== District 21 ===
Election results, district 21
Party	Candidate	Votes	%
Republican	Gerald Allen (incumbent)	33,368	67.512
Democratic	Rick Burnham	16,005	32.382
Independent	Write-in	52	0.105
Total votes		49,425	100.0
Republican hold			

=== District 22 ===
Election results, district 22
Party	Candidate	Votes	%
Republican	Greg Albritton (incumbent)	34,507	98.544
Independent	Write-in	510	1.456
Total votes		35,017	100.0
Republican hold			

=== District 23 ===
Election results, district 23
Party	Candidate	Votes	%
Democratic	Malika Sanders-Fortier	30,193	65.527
Independent	Mark Story	15,796	34.282
Independent	Write-in	88	0.191
Total votes		46,077	100.0
Democratic hold			

=== District 24 ===
Election results, district 24
Party	Candidate	Votes	%
Democratic	Bobby Singleton (incumbent)	37,394	98.488
Independent	Write-in	574	1.512
Total votes		37,968	100.0
Democratic hold			

=== District 25 ===
Election results, district 25
Party	Candidate	Votes	%
Republican	Will Barfoot	33,029	61.252
Democratic	David Sadler	20,866	38.696
Independent	Write-in	28	0.052
Total votes		53,923	100.0
Republican hold			

=== District 26 ===
Election results, district 26
Party	Candidate	Votes	%
Democratic	David Burkette (incumbent)	31,973	80.171
Republican	D.J. Johnson	7,863	19.716
Independent	Write-in	45	0.113
Total votes		39,881	100.0
Democratic hold			

=== District 27 ===
Election results, district 27
Party	Candidate	Votes	%
Republican	Tom Whatley (incumbent)	29,741	59.036
Democratic	Nancy Carlton Bendinger	20,587	40.865
Independent	Write-in	50	0.099
Total votes		50,378	100.0
Republican hold			

=== District 28 ===
Election results, district 28
Party	Candidate	Votes	%
Democratic	Billy Beasley (incumbent)	28,445	97.471
Independent	Write-in	738	2.529
Total votes		29,183	100.0
Democratic hold			

=== District 29 ===
Election results, district 29
Party	Candidate	Votes	%
Republican	Donnie Chesteen	34,273	93.222
Independent	Write-in	2,492	6.778
Total votes		36,765	100.0
Republican hold			

=== District 30 ===
Election results, district 30
Party	Candidate	Votes	%
Republican	Clyde Chambliss, Jr. (incumbent)	35,259	98.105
Independent	Write-in	681	1.895
Total votes		35,940	100.0
Republican hold			

=== District 31 ===
Election results, district 31
Party	Candidate	Votes	%
Republican	Jimmy Holley (incumbent)	33,137	98.484
Independent	Write-in	510	1.516
Total votes		33,647	100.0
Republican hold			

=== District 32 ===
Election results, district 32
Party	Candidate	Votes	%
Republican	Chris Elliott	45,726	74.955
Democratic	Jason Fisher	15,193	24.905
Independent	Write-in	86	0.141
Total votes		61,005	100.0
Republican hold			

=== District 33 ===
Election results, district 33
Party	Candidate	Votes	%
Democratic	Vivian Davis Figures (incumbent)	34,995	98.605
Independent	Write-in	495	1.395
Total votes		35,490	100.0
Democratic hold			

=== District 34 ===
Election results, district 34
Party	Candidate	Votes	%
Republican	Jack Williams	35,093	97.758
Independent	Write-in	805	2.242
Total votes		35,898	100.0
Republican hold			

=== District 35 ===
Election results, district 35
Party	Candidate	Votes	%
Republican	David Sessions	29,046	67.582
Democratic	Tom Holmes	13,896	32.332
Independent	Write-in	37	0.086
Total votes		42,979	100.0
Republican hold			

== See also ==
- 2018 United States elections
- 2018 United States House of Representatives elections in Alabama
- 2018 Alabama gubernatorial election
- 2018 Alabama lieutenant gubernatorial election
- 2018 Alabama Attorney General election
- 2018 Alabama State Treasurer election
- 2018 Alabama State Auditor election
- 2018 Alabama Commissioner of Agriculture and Industries election
- 2018 Alabama Public Service Commission election
- 2018 Alabama Secretary of State election
- 2018 Alabama House of Representatives election
- 2018 Alabama elections
- Supreme Court of Alabama elections
- List of Alabama state legislatures
