= 2026 Alabama Senate election =

Legislative election in Alabama

- November 3, 2026

All 35 seats of the Alabama Senate 18 seats needed for a majority
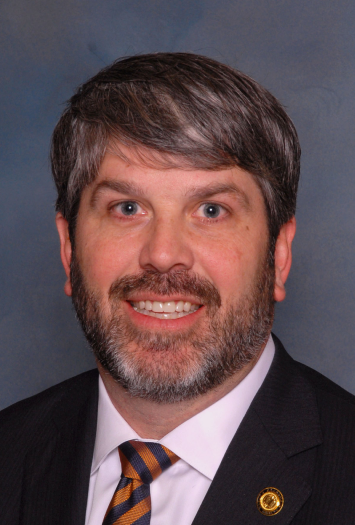

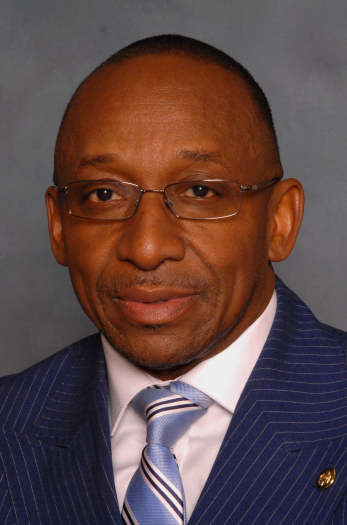
	Majority party	Minority party
Leader	Garlan Gudger	Bobby Singleton
Party	Republican	Democratic
Leader since	December 3, 2024	January 8, 2019
Leader's seat	4th	24th
Seats before	27	8
Seats after	25 or 24 (Note: Republican-Independent race in District 10 remains uncalled, independent Jesse Battles has been seated ahead of a recount.)	10
Seat change	▼2 or 3	▲2
- Republican hold Democratic hold Democratic gain Independent gain Republican: 50–60% 60–70% 70–80% 90–100% Democratic: 50–60% 60–70% 90–100% Independent: 50–60%
President pro tempore of the Senate before election
Garlan Gudger
Republican
Elected President pro tempore of the Senate
TBD

The 2026 Alabama Senate election was held on November 3, 2026. Voters elected members of the Alabama Senate in all 35 of the U.S. state of Alabama's legislative districts to serve a four-year term. The first round of the primary took place on May 19, 2026.

Prior to the election, the Republican Party of Alabama held a wide majority over the Democratic Party of Alabama, controlling 27 seats to their eight seats.

This election took place alongside races for U.S. Senate, U.S. House, governor, state house, and numerous other state and local offices.

== Background ==
=== Stone v. Allen ===
During the 2020 redistricting cycle, Alabama's congressional and state legislative maps faced legal challenges for alleged violations of Section 2 of the Voting Rights Act of 1965. 27% of Alabama's population is African American, but only eight of Alabama's senate districts, or 23%, were drawn with a black majority. The initial complaint challenged twelve of the senate districts and twenty-one of the state house districts, although the lawsuit was ultimately reduced to four of the senate districts in Huntsville and Montgomery.

On 29 May 2026, a federal appeals court allowed the legislature to use the state senate maps drawn in 2021 after a previous ruling had forced the redrawing of two senate districts in Montgomery. On the same day, Governor Kay Ivey voided the results of the primaries in newly-drawn senate districts 25 and 26, calling a new special primary for the two districts to take place on August 11.

== Special elections since 2022 ==
The following races took place after the 2022 general election:

District	County(ies)	Contest	Incumbent	Winner	Result	Cause
5th	Fayette; Jefferson (p); Lamar; Tuscaloosa (p); Walker	Jun. 24, 2025	Greg Reed (R)	Matt Woods (R)	Rep hold.	Incumbent senator resigned January 1, 2025 to serve as an advisor for Governor Kay Ivey's administration.
9th	Blount (p); Marshall; Madison (p)	~~Apr. 23, 2024~~; Jan. 9, 2024	Clay Scofield (R)	Wes Kitchens (R)	Rep hold.	Incumbent senator resigned October 30, 2023 to join the private sector. General election cancelled after the Republican primary, as no other candidates remained.

== Retirements ==
=== Republicans ===
1. District 2: Tom Butler is retiring
2. District 34: Jack Williams is retiring to run for commissioner of Agriculture and Industries.

== Incumbents defeated ==
=== In primary elections ===
==== Republicans ====
1. District 15: Dan Roberts lost renomination to Scott Ortis.
2. District 22: Greg Albritton lost renomination to Terry Waters.

=== In general election ===
==== Republicans ====
1. District 7: Sam Givhan lost reelection to Democrat Jared Sluss
2. District 10: Andrew Jones lost reelection to Independent Jesse Battles

== Predictions ==
Source	Ranking	As of
Sabato's Crystal Ball	Safe R	January 22, 2026
State Navigate	Safe R	October 14, 2026

== Overview ==
Party	Candidates	Votes		Seats		
Party	Candidates	No.	%	Before	After	+/–
Republican				27	24	▼3
Democratic				8	10	▲2
Independent				0	1	▲1
Total				35	35	

== Summary of results by Alabama Senate district ==
District	Incumbent	Party	Elected senator	Outcome
1st	Tim Melson	Rep	Tim Melson	Rep
2nd	Tom Butler	Rep	Rudolph Drake	Dem flip
3rd	Arthur Orr	Rep	Arthur Orr	Rep
4th	Garlan Gudger	Rep	Garlan Gudger	Rep
5th	Matt Woods (Note: Succeeded Republican senator Greg Reed, who resigned in 2025 to join governor Kay Ivey's administration, after a June 2025 special election.)	Rep	Matt Woods	Rep
6th	Larry Stutts	Rep	Larry Stutts	Rep
7th	Sam Givhan	Rep	Jared Sluss	Dem flip
8th	Steve Livingston	Rep	Steve Livingston	Rep
9th	Wes Kitchens (Note: Kitchens took office in a special election following the resignation of Clay Scofield.)	Rep	Wes Kitchens	Rep
10th	Andrew Jones	Rep	Jesse Battles	Ind flip
11th	Lance Bell	Rep	Lance Bell	Rep
12th	Keith Kelley	Rep	Keith Kelley	Rep
13th	Randy Price	Rep	Randy Price	Rep
14th	April Weaver	Rep	April Weaver	Rep
15th	Dan Roberts	Rep	Scott Ortis	Rep
16th	J. T. Waggoner	Rep	J. T. Waggoner	Rep
17th	Shay Shelnutt	Rep	Shay Shelnutt	Rep
18th	Rodger Smitherman	Dem	Rodger Smitherman	Dem
19th	Merika Coleman	Dem	Merika Coleman	Dem
20th	Linda Coleman-Madison	Dem	Linda Coleman-Madison	Dem
21st	Gerald Allen	Rep	Gerald Allen	Rep
22nd	Greg Albritton	Rep	Terry Waters	Rep
23rd	Robert Stewart	Dem	Robert Stewart	Dem
24th	Bobby Singleton	Dem	Bobby Singleton	Dem
25th	Will Barfoot	Rep	Will Barfoot	Rep
26th	Kirk Hatcher	Dem	Kirk Hatcher	Dem
27th	Jay Hovey	Rep	Jay Hovey	Rep
28th	Billy Beasley	Dem	Billy Beasley	Dem
29th	Donnie Chesteen	Rep	Donnie Chesteen	Rep
30th	Clyde Chambliss	Rep	Clyde Chambliss	Rep
31st	Josh Carnley	Rep	Josh Carnley	Rep
32nd	Chris Elliott	Rep	Chris Elliott	Rep
33rd	Vivian Davis Figures	Dem	Vivian Davis Figures	Dem
34th	Jack W. Williams	Rep	Rusty Glover	Rep
35th	David Sessions	Rep	David Sessions	Rep

== District 1 ==
=== Republican primary ===
==== Candidates ====
===== Nominee =====
- Tim Melson, incumbent state senator

==== Endorsements ====
Tim Melson

Organizations

- Alabama Realtors PAC
- Manufacture Alabama

=== General election ===
==== Results ====
2026 Alabama's 1st Senate district election
Party	Candidate	Votes	%
Republican	Tim Melson (incumbent)		
Write-in			
Total votes			100.00

== District 2 ==
=== Republican primary ===
==== Candidates ====
===== Nominee =====
- John Roberts, businessman and candidate for U.S. representative in 2022

===== Declined =====
- Tom Butler, incumbent state senator

==== Endorsements ====
John Roberts

Organizations

- Alabama Farmers Federation
- Alabama Realtors PAC
- Business Council of Alabama
- Manufacture Alabama

=== Democratic primary ===
==== Candidates ====
===== Nominee =====
- Rudolph Valentino Drake

===== Eliminated in primary =====
- Alex House, academic advisor

===== Eliminated in primary =====
- Guy Sotomayor, pilot and nominee for Madison County Commission chair in 2024

==== Results ====
Democratic primary
Party	Candidate	Votes	%
Democratic	Rudolph Valentino Drake	4,561	36.57
Democratic	Alex House	4,221	33.85
Democratic	Guy Sotomayor	3,689	29.58
Total votes		12,471	100.00

==== Runoff ====
===== Results =====
Democratic primary runoff
Party	Candidate	Votes	%
Democratic	Rudolph Valentino Drake	3,146	53.49
Democratic	Alex House	2,736	46.51
Total votes		5,882	100.00

=== General election ===
==== Fundraising ====
Campaign finance reports as of November 2, 2026
Candidate	Raised	Other receipts	Spent	Cash on hand
John Roberts (R)	$843,400	$0	$775,548	$67,851
Rudolph Valentino Drake (D)	$4,481	$20,000	$21,747	$2,734
Source: Alabama FCPA

==== Results ====
2026 Alabama's 2nd Senate district election
Party	Candidate	Votes	%
Republican	John Roberts	27,130	44.0
Democratic	Rudolph Valentino Drake	34,585	56.0
Write-in			
Total votes		61,715	100.00

== District 3 ==
=== Republican primary ===
==== Candidates ====
===== Nominee =====
- Arthur Orr, incumbent state senator

==== Endorsements ====
Arthur Orr

Organizations

- Alabama Realtors PAC
- Business Council of Alabama
- Manufacture Alabama

=== Democratic primary ===
==== Candidates ====
===== Nominee =====
- John Dickey, educator

=== General election ===
==== Fundraising ====
Campaign finance reports as of November 2, 2026
Candidate	Raised	Other receipts	Spent	Cash on hand
Arthur Orr (R)	$1,143,549	$192,635	$130,858	$1,668,946
John Dickey (D)	$903	$10,200	$10,944	$158
Source: Alabama FCPA

==== Results ====
2026 Alabama's 3rd Senate district election
Party	Candidate	Votes	%
Republican	Arthur Orr (incumbent)		
Democratic	John Dickey		
Write-in			
Total votes			100.00

== District 4 ==
=== Republican primary ===
==== Candidates ====
===== Nominee =====
- Garlan Gudger, incumbent state senator

===== Eliminated in primary =====
- JR Bowling, candidate for state house in 2018

===== Declined =====
- Justin Pruett, former member of the Hanceville City Council

==== Endorsements ====
J.R. Bowling

Organizations

- National Association for Gun Rights
Garlan Gudger

Organizations

- Alabama Forestry Association
- Alabama Realtors PAC
- Business Council of Alabama
- Electric Cooperatives of Alabama
- Manufacture Alabama
- National Rifle Association Political Victory Fund

==== Polling ====
Hypothetical polling

Poll source	Date(s) administered	Sample size (Note: Key: A – all adults RV – registered voters LV – likely voters V – unclear)	Margin of error	Garlan Gudger	Cindy Myrex	Kerry Watson	Bradley Williams	Undecided
Cullman Daily	August 13, 2025	355 (V)	± 5%	30%	29%	—N/a	—N/a	41%
Cullman Daily	August 13, 2025	355 (V)	± 5%	31%	—N/a	22%	—N/a	47%
Cullman Daily	August 13, 2025	355 (V)	± 5%	33%	—N/a	—N/a	23%	44%

==== Results ====
Republican primary
Party	Candidate	Votes	%
Republican	Garlan Gudger (incumbent)	15,422	64.65
Republican	J.R. Bowling	8,432	35.35
Total votes		23,854	100.00

=== General election ===
==== Results ====
2026 Alabama's 4th Senate district election
Party	Candidate	Votes	%
Republican	Garlan Gudger (incumbent)		
Write-in			
Total votes			100.00

== District 5 ==
=== Republican primary ===
==== Candidates ====
===== Nominee =====
- Matt Woods, incumbent senator

==== Endorsements ====
Matt Woods

Organizations

- Alabama Realtors PAC
- Business Council of Alabama
- Manufacture Alabama

=== General election ===
==== Results ====
2026 Alabama's 5th Senate district election
Party	Candidate	Votes	%
Republican	Matt Woods		
Write-in			
Total votes			100.00

== District 6 ==
=== Republican primary ===
==== Candidates ====
===== Nominee =====
- Larry Stutts, incumbent state senator

==== Endorsements ====
Larry Stutts

Organizations

- Alabama Farmers Federation
- Alabama Realtors PAC

=== Democratic primary ===
==== Candidates ====
===== Nominee =====
- Bobby Martin

=== General election ===
==== Fundraising ====
Campaign finance reports as of November 2, 2026
Candidate	Raised	Other receipts	Spent	Cash on hand
Larry Stutts (R)	$679,256	$19,035	$620,177	$151,288
Bobby Martin (D)	$1,313	$1,331	$1,872	$772
Source: Alabama FCPA

==== Results ====
2026 Alabama's 6th Senate district election
Party	Candidate	Votes	%
Republican	Larry Stutts (incumbent)		
Democratic	Bobby Martin		
Write-in			
Total votes			100.00

== District 7 ==
=== Republican primary ===
==== Candidates ====
===== Nominee =====
- Sam Givhan, incumbent state senator

==== Endorsements ====
Sam Givhan

Organizations

- Alabama Realtors PAC
- Business Council of Alabama
- Manufacture Alabama

=== Democratic primary ===
==== Candidates ====
===== Nominee =====
- Jared Sluss

=== General election ===
==== Fundraising ====
Campaign finance reports as of November 2, 2026
Candidate	Raised	Other receipts	Spent	Cash on hand
Sam Givhan (R)	$735,027	$163,065	$977,592	$331,655
Jared Sluss (D)	$62,271	$3,419	$45,497	$20,193
Source: Alabama FCPA

==== Results ====
2026 Alabama's 7th Senate district election
Party	Candidate	Votes	%
Republican	Sam Givhan (incumbent)		
Democratic	Jared Sluss		
Write-in			
Total votes			100.00

== District 8 ==
=== Republican primary ===
==== Candidates ====
===== Nominee =====
- Steve Livingston, incumbent state senator

==== Endorsements ====
Steve Livingston

Organizations

- Alabama Forestry Association
- Alabama Realtors PAC
- Business Council of Alabama
- Manufacture Alabama

=== Democratic primary ===
==== Candidates ====
===== Nominee =====
- Katie Kramer

=== General election ===
==== Fundraising ====
Campaign finance reports as of November 2, 2026
Candidate	Raised	Other receipts	Spent	Cash on hand
Steve Livingston (R)	$619,745	$29,456	$322,486	$615,132
Katie Kramer (D)	$14,340	$0	$11,715	$2,624
Source: Alabama FCPA

==== Results ====
2026 Alabama's 8th Senate district election
Party	Candidate	Votes	%
Republican	Steve Livingston (incumbent)		
Democratic	Katie Kramer		
Write-in			
Total votes			100.00

== District 9 ==
=== Republican primary ===
==== Candidates ====
===== Nominee =====
- Wes Kitchens, incumbent state senator

==== Endorsements ====
Wes Kitchens

Organizations

- Alabama Realtors PAC
- Business Council of Alabama
- Manufacture Alabama

=== General election ===
==== Results ====
2026 Alabama's 9th Senate district election
Party	Candidate	Votes	%
Republican	Wes Kitchens		
Write-in			
Total votes			100.00

== District 10 ==
=== Republican primary ===
==== Candidates ====
===== Nominee =====
- Andrew Jones, incumbent state senator

===== Eliminated in primary =====
- Amy Dozier Minton, vice chair of the Etowah County Republican Party

==== Endorsements ====
Andrew Jones

Organizations

- Alabama Realtors PAC
- Business Council of Alabama
- Manufacture Alabama
- National Rifle Association Political Victory Fund
Amy Dozier Minton

Organizations

- Alabama Farmers Federation

==== Results ====
Republican primary
Party	Candidate	Votes	%
Republican	Andrew Jones (incumbent)	8,308	53.83
Republican	Amy Dozier Minton	7,127	46.17
Total votes		15,435	100.00

=== Independent candidates ===
==== Declared ====
- Jesse Battles, business owner and disqualified candidate in the primary election

=== General election ===
==== Fundraising ====
Campaign finance reports as of November 2, 2026
Candidate	Raised	Other receipts	Spent	Cash on hand
Andrew Jones (R)	$1,460,077	$287,876	$1,494,781	$481,504
Jesse Battles (I)	$158,005	$17,000	$149,274	$25,730
Source: Alabama FCPA

==== Results ====
2026 Alabama's 10th Senate district election
Party	Candidate	Votes	%
Republican	Andrew Jones (incumbent)		
Independent	Jesse Battles		
Write-in			
Total votes			100.00

== District 11 ==
=== Republican primary ===
==== Candidates ====
===== Nominee =====
- Lance Bell, incumbent state senator

==== Endorsements ====
Lance Bell

Organizations

- Alabama Realtors PAC
- Business Council of Alabama
- Manufacture Alabama

=== Democratic primary ===
==== Candidates ====
===== Nominee =====
- Donald Mottern, journalist

==== Endorsements ====
Donald Mottern

Organizations

- Alabama Cannabis Coalition

=== General election ===
==== Fundraising ====
Campaign finance reports as of November 2, 2026
Candidate	Raised	Other receipts	Spent	Cash on hand
Lance Bell (R)	$677,642	$100,000	$287,160	$690,208
Donald Mottern (D)	$5,888	$0	$5,787	$100
Source: Alabama FCPA

==== Results ====
2026 Alabama's 11th Senate district election
Party	Candidate	Votes	%
Republican	Lance Bell (incumbent)		
Democratic	Donald Mottern		
Write-in			
Total votes			100.00

== District 12 ==
=== Republican primary ===
==== Candidates ====
===== Nominee =====
- Keith Kelley, incumbent state senator

==== Endorsements ====
Keith Kelley

Organizations

- Alabama Realtors PAC
- Business Council of Alabama
- Manufacture Alabama

=== General election ===
==== Results ====
2026 Alabama's 12th Senate district election
Party	Candidate	Votes	%
Republican	Keith Kelley (incumbent)		
Write-in			
Total votes			100.00

== District 13 ==
=== Republican primary ===
==== Candidates ====
===== Nominee =====
- Randy Price, incumbent state senator

===== Eliminated in primary =====
- Gerald Dial, former state senator (1983–2006, 2010–2018)

==== Endorsements ====
Gerald Dial

Organizations

- National Association for Gun Rights
Randy Price

Organizations

- Alabama Realtors PAC
- Business Council of Alabama
- Manufacture Alabama
- National Rifle Association Political Victory Fund

==== Results ====
Republican primary
Party	Candidate	Votes	%
Republican	Randy Price (incumbent)	11,457	62.15
Republican	Gerald Dial	6,976	37.85
Total votes		18,433	100.00

=== Democratic primary ===
==== Candidates ====
===== Nominee =====
- Jamie Forsyth

=== General election ===
==== Fundraising ====
Campaign finance reports as of November 2, 2026
Candidate	Raised	Other receipts	Spent	Cash on hand
Randy Price (R)	$944,326	$4	$642,023	$425,942
Jamie Forsyth (D)	$2,629	$0	$2,627	$1
Source: Alabama FCPA

==== Results ====
2026 Alabama's 13th Senate district election
Party	Candidate	Votes	%
Republican	Randy Price (incumbent)		
Democratic	Jamie Forsyth		
Write-in			
Total votes			100.00

== District 14 ==
=== Republican primary ===
==== Candidates ====
===== Nominee =====
- April Weaver, incumbent state senator

==== Endorsements ====
April Weaver

Organizations

- Alabama Farmers Federation
- Alabama Realtors PAC
- Business Council of Alabama
- Manufacture Alabama

=== Democratic primary ===
==== Candidates ====
===== Nominee =====
- Mandie Ledkins, community advocate

==== Endorsements ====
Mandie Ledkins

Organizations

- Alabama Cannabis Coalition

=== General election ===
==== Fundraising ====
Campaign finance reports as of November 2, 2026
Candidate	Raised	Other receipts	Spent	Cash on hand
April Weaver (R)	$669,325	$15,793	$341,764	$462,345
Mandie Ledkins (D)	$16,884	$0	$16,846	$38
Source: Alabama FCPA

==== Results ====
2026 Alabama's 14th Senate district election
Party	Candidate	Votes	%
Republican	April Weaver (incumbent)		
Democratic	Mandie Ledkins		
Write-in			
Total votes			100.00

== District 15 ==
=== Republican primary ===
==== Candidates ====
===== Nominee =====
- Scott Ortis, home infusion and enteral care business owner

===== Eliminated in primary =====
- Dan Roberts, incumbent state senator

==== Endorsements ====
Scott Ortis

Organizations

- Business Council of Alabama
Dan Roberts

Organizations

- Alabama Farmers Federation
- Alabama Realtors PAC
- Manufacture Alabama
- National Rifle Association Political Victory Fund

==== Results ====
Republican primary
Party	Candidate	Votes	%
Republican	Scott Ortis	8,300	52.06
Republican	Dan Roberts (incumbent)	7,643	47.94
Total votes		15,943	100.00

=== General election ===
==== Results ====
2026 Alabama's 15th Senate district election
Party	Candidate	Votes	%
Republican	Scott Ortis		
Write-in			
Total votes			100.00

== District 16 ==
=== Republican primary ===
==== Candidates ====
===== Nominee =====
- Jabo Waggoner, incumbent state senator

===== Eliminated in primary =====
- Nate Carson

==== Endorsements ====
Jabo Waggoner

U.S. representatives

- Newt Gingrich, speaker of the house (1995–1999) from GA-06 (1979–1999)

Local officials

- Nick Derzis, mayor of Hoover (2025–present)

Organizations

- Alabama Realtors PAC
- Business Council of Alabama
- Manufacture Alabama
- National Rifle Association Political Victory Fund

==== Results ====
Republican primary
Party	Candidate	Votes	%
Republican	J.T. "Jabo" Waggoner (incumbent)	7,695	54.13
Republican	Nate Carlson	6,522	45.87
Total votes		14,217	100.00

=== Democratic primary ===
==== Candidates ====
===== Nominee =====
- Spencer Stone, educator

=== General election ===
==== Fundraising ====
Campaign finance reports as of November 2, 2026
Candidate	Raised	Other receipts	Spent	Cash on hand
Jabo Waggoner (R)	$974,667	$0	$1,116,646	$305,216
Spencer Stone (D)	$935	$250	$591	$594
Source: Alabama FCPA

==== Results ====
2026 Alabama's 16th Senate district election
Party	Candidate	Votes	%
Republican	J. T. Waggoner (incumbent)		
Democratic	Spencer Stone		
Write-in			
Total votes			100.00

== District 17 ==
=== Republican primary ===
==== Candidates ====
===== Nominee =====
- Shay Shelnutt, incumbent state senator

==== Endorsements ====
Shay Shelnutt

Organizations

- Alabama Realtors PAC
- Business Council of Alabama
- Manufacture Alabama

=== General election ===
==== Results ====
2026 Alabama's 17th Senate district election
Party	Candidate	Votes	%
Republican	Shay Shelnutt		
Write-in			
Total votes			100.00

== District 18 ==
=== Democratic primary ===
==== Candidates ====
===== Nominee =====
- Rodger Smitherman, incumbent state senator

==== Endorsements ====
Rodger Smitherman

Organizations

- Alabama Realtors PAC
- Business Council of Alabama
- Manufacture Alabama

=== General election ===
==== Results ====
2026 Alabama's 18th Senate district election
Party	Candidate	Votes	%
Democratic	Rodger Smitherman (incumbent)		
Write-in			
Total votes			100.00

== District 19 ==
=== Democratic primary ===
==== Candidates ====
===== Nominee =====
- Merika Coleman, incumbent state senator

==== Endorsements ====
Merika Coleman

Organizations

- Alabama Realtors PAC
- Business Council of Alabama
- Manufacture Alabama

=== General election ===
==== Results ====
2026 Alabama's 19th Senate district election
Party	Candidate	Votes	%
Democratic	Merika Coleman (incumbent)		
Write-in			
Total votes			100.00

== District 20 ==
=== Democratic primary ===
==== Candidates ====
===== Nominee =====
- Linda Coleman-Madison, incumbent state senator

==== Endorsements ====
Linda Coleman-Madison

Organizations

- Alabama Realtors PAC

=== General election ===
==== Results ====
2026 Alabama's 20th Senate district election
Party	Candidate	Votes	%
Democratic	Linda Coleman-Madison (incumbent)		
Write-in			
Total votes			100.00

== District 21 ==
=== Republican primary ===
==== Candidates ====
===== Nominee =====
- Gerald Allen, incumbent state senator

==== Endorsements ====
Gerald Allen

Organizations

- Alabama Farmers Federation
- Alabama Realtors PAC
- Business Council of Alabama
- Manufacture Alabama
- National Association for Gun Rights

=== Independent candidates ===
==== Declared ====
- Jolie Woodrow Minor Jr.

=== General election ===
==== Fundraising ====
Campaign finance reports as of November 2, 2026
Candidate	Raised	Other receipts	Spent	Cash on hand
Gerald Allen (R)	$491,605	$30,303	$324,856	$229,442
Jolie Woodrow Minor Jr. (I)	$24,219	$0	$16,728	$7,490
Source: Alabama FCPA

==== Results ====
2026 Alabama's 21st Senate district election
Party	Candidate	Votes	%
Republican	Gerald Allen (incumbent)		
Independent	Jolie Woodrow Minor Jr.		
Write-in			
Total votes			100.00

== District 22 ==
=== Republican primary ===
==== Candidates ====
===== Nominee =====
- Terry Waters, farmer and small business owner

===== Eliminated in primary =====
- Greg Albritton, incumbent state senator

==== Endorsements ====
Greg Albritton

Organizations

- Alabama Realtors PAC
- Business Council of Alabama
- Manufacture Alabama

==== Results ====
Republican primary
Party	Candidate	Votes	%
Republican	Terry L. Waters	9,084	52.11
Republican	Greg Albritton (incumbent)	8,349	47.89
Total votes		17,433	100.00

=== Democratic primary ===
==== Candidates ====
===== Nominee =====
- Ashley Sharpe

=== General election ===
==== Fundraising ====
Campaign finance reports as of November 2, 2026
Candidate	Raised	Other receipts	Spent	Cash on hand
Terry Waters (R)	$214,050	$37,500	$91,381	$160,168
Ashley Sharpe (D)	$7,297	$0	$5,892	$1,405
Source: Alabama FCPA

==== Results ====
2026 Alabama's 22nd Senate district election
Party	Candidate	Votes	%
Republican	Terry Waters		
Democratic	Ashley Sharpe		
Write-in			
Total votes			100.00

== District 23 ==
=== Democratic primary ===
==== Candidates ====
===== Nominee =====
- Robert Stewart, incumbent state senator

==== Endorsements ====
Robert Stewart

Organizations

- Alabama Realtors PAC
- Manufacture Alabama

=== Republican primary ===
==== Candidates ====
===== Nominee =====
- Thayer Spencer

=== General election ===
==== Fundraising ====
Campaign finance reports as of November 2, 2026
Candidate	Raised	Other receipts	Spent	Cash on hand
Robert Stewart (D)	$323,493	$331	$220,475	$103,349
Source: Alabama FCPA

==== Results ====
2026 Alabama's 23rd Senate district election
Party	Candidate	Votes	%
Democratic	Robert Stewart (incumbent)		
Republican	Thayer Spencer		
Write-in			
Total votes			100.00

== District 24 ==
=== Democratic primary ===
==== Candidates ====
===== Nominee =====
- Bobby Singleton, incumbent state senator

==== Endorsements ====
Bobby Singleton

Organizations

- Alabama Realtors PAC
- Business Council of Alabama
- Manufacture Alabama

=== Republican primary ===
==== Candidates ====
===== Disqualified =====
- Richard Benderson

=== General election ===
==== Results ====
2026 Alabama's 24th Senate district election
Party	Candidate	Votes	%
Democratic	Bobby Singleton (incumbent)		
Write-in			
Total votes			100.00

== District 25 ==
=== Republican primary (voided) ===
==== Candidates ====
===== Nominee =====
- Russell "Ty" Taylor

===== Declined =====
- Will Barfoot, incumbent state senator (running in the 26th district)

=== Democratic primary (voided) ===
==== Candidates ====
===== Nominee =====
- Kirk Hatcher, incumbent state senator for the 26th district

===== Eliminated in primary =====
- Phadra Carson Foster
- KK Middleton

==== Endorsements ====
Kirk Hatcher

Organizations

- Alabama Realtors PAC

==== Results ====
Democratic primary (voided)
Party	Candidate	Votes	%
Democratic	Kirk Hatcher (incumbent)	12,250	55.40
Democratic	Phadra Carson Foster	5,312	24.02
Democratic	KK Middleton	4,549	20.57
Total votes		22,111	100.00

=== Special Republican primary ===
==== Candidates ====
===== Nominee =====
- Will Barfoot, incumbent state senator (previously ran in this district, then in the 26th district)

=== Special Democratic primary ===
==== Candidates ====
===== Presumptive nominee =====
- Phadra Carson Foster, candidate for this district in the regular primary

=== General election ===
==== Fundraising ====
Campaign finance reports as of November 2, 2026
Candidate	Raised	Other receipts	Spent	Cash on hand
Will Barfoot (R)	$1,199,463	$38,045	$873,374	$586,943
Phadra Carson Foster (D)	$14,625	$5,000	$17,523	$2,101
Source: Alabama FCPA

==== Results ====
2026 Alabama's 25th Senate district election
Party	Candidate	Votes	%
Republican	Will Barfoot (incumbent)		
Democratic	Phadra Carson Foster		
Write-in			
Total votes			100.00

== District 26 ==
=== Democratic primary (voided) ===
==== Candidates ====
===== Nominee =====
- Tabitha Isner, vice chair of the Alabama Democratic Party (2022–present)

===== Declined =====
- Kirk Hatcher, incumbent state senator (running in the 25th district)

=== Republican primary (voided) ===
==== Candidates ====
===== Nominee =====
- Will Barfoot, incumbent state senator for the 25th district (previously ran in the 25th district)

==== Endorsements ====
Will Barfoot

Organizations

- Alabama Realtors PAC
- Business Council of Alabama
- Manufacture Alabama

=== Special Democratic primary ===
==== Candidates ====
===== Presumptive nominee =====
- Kirk Hatcher, incumbent state senator (previously ran in this district, then in the 25th district)

=== General election ===
==== Results ====
2026 Alabama's 26th Senate district election
Party	Candidate	Votes	%
Democratic	Kirk Hatcher (incumbent)		
Write-in			
Total votes			100.00

== District 27 ==
=== Republican primary ===
==== Candidates ====
===== Nominee =====
- Jay Hovey, incumbent state senator

===== Eliminated in primary =====
- Doug Cannon, member of the Lee County Commission from district 1 (2021–present)

==== Endorsements ====
Jay Hovey

Organizations

- Alabama Realtors PAC
- Business Council of Alabama
- Manufacture Alabama
- National Rifle Association Political Victory Fund

==== Results ====
Republican primary
Party	Candidate	Votes	%
Republican	Jay Hovey (incumbent)	10,933	68.90
Republican	Doug Cannon	4,936	31.10
Total votes		15,869	100.00

=== General election ===
==== Results ====
2026 Alabama's 27th Senate district election
Party	Candidate	Votes	%
Republican	Jay Hovey (incumbent)		
Write-in			
Total votes			100.00

== District 28 ==
=== Democratic primary ===
==== Candidates ====
===== Nominee =====
- Billy Beasley, incumbent state senator

==== Endorsements ====
Billy Beasley

Organizations

- Alabama Realtors PAC

=== Republican primary ===
==== Candidates ====
===== Nominee =====
- Brent Comer

=== General election ===
==== Fundraising ====
Campaign finance reports as of November 2, 2026
Candidate	Raised	Other receipts	Spent	Cash on hand
Brent Comer (R)	$43,640	$7,000	$42,753	$7,887
Billy Beasley (D)	$479,088	$0	$252,026	$314,215
Source: Alabama FCPA

==== Results ====
2026 Alabama's 28th Senate district election
Party	Candidate	Votes	%
Democratic	Billy Beasley (incumbent)		
Republican	Brent Comer		
Write-in			
Total votes			100.00

== District 29 ==
=== Republican primary ===
==== Candidates ====
===== Nominee =====
- Donnie Chesteen, incumbent state senator

===== Eliminated in primary =====
- Val Paul
- Zachary Hurst, law enforcement officer

==== Endorsements ====
Donnie Chesteen

Organizations

- Alabama Farmers Federation
- Alabama Realtors PAC
- Business Council of Alabama
- Manufacture Alabama
- National Rifle Association Political Victory Fund

==== Results ====
Republican primary
Party	Candidate	Votes	%
Republican	Donnie Chesteen (incumbent)	14,068	85.00
Republican	Zachary J. Hurst	1,952	11.79
Republican	Val Glasgow Paul	530	3.20
Total votes		16,550	100.00

=== Democratic primary ===
==== Candidates ====
===== Nominee =====
- Jimmy McCray

=== General election ===
==== Fundraising ====
Campaign finance reports as of November 2, 2026
Candidate	Raised	Other receipts	Spent	Cash on hand
Donnie Chesteen (R)	$778,638	$0	$357,602	$711,998
Jimmy McCray (D)	$1,430	$0	$1,430	$0
Source: Alabama FCPA

==== Results ====
2026 Alabama's 29th Senate district election
Party	Candidate	Votes	%
Republican	Donnie Chesteen (incumbent)		
Democratic	Jimmy McCray		
Write-in			
Total votes			100.00

== District 30 ==
=== Republican primary ===
==== Candidates ====
===== Nominee =====
- Clyde Chambliss, incumbent state senator

==== Endorsements ====
Clyde Chambliss

Organizations

- Alabama Realtors PAC
- Business Council of Alabama
- Manufacture Alabama

=== General election ===
==== Results ====
2026 Alabama's 30th Senate district election
Party	Candidate	Votes	%
Republican	Clyde Chambliss (incumbent)		
Write-in			
Total votes			100.00

== District 31 ==
=== Republican primary ===
==== Candidates ====
===== Nominee =====
- Josh Carnley, incumbent state senator

==== Endorsements ====
Josh Carnley

Organizations

- Alabama Farmers Federation
- Alabama Realtors PAC
- Business Council of Alabama
- Manufacture Alabama

=== General election ===
==== Results ====
2026 Alabama's 31st Senate district election
Party	Candidate	Votes	%
Republican	Josh Carnley (incumbent)		{{{percentage}}}
Write-in			
Total votes			100.00

== District 32 ==
=== Republican primary ===
==== Candidates ====
===== Nominee =====
- Chris Elliott, incumbent state senator

===== Eliminated in primary =====
- Mike Van, car salesman

==== Endorsements ====
Chris Elliott

Organizations

- Alabama Farmers Federation
- Alabama Realtors PAC
- Business Council of Alabama
- Manufacture Alabama
- National Rifle Association Political Victory Fund

==== Results ====
Republican primary
Party	Candidate	Votes	%
Republican	Chris Elliott (incumbent)	14,561	72.78
Republican	Mike Vandenheuvel	5,445	27.22
Total votes		20,006	100.00

=== Democratic primary ===
==== Candidates ====
===== Nominee =====
- Janet Appleby

=== General election ===
==== Fundraising ====
Campaign finance reports as of November 2, 2026
Candidate	Raised	Other receipts	Spent	Cash on hand
Chris Elliott (R)	$1,061,348	$2,221	$929,740	$383,552
Janet Appleby (D)	$3,378	$1,232	$3,399	$1,211
Source: Alabama FCPA

==== Results ====
2026 Alabama's 32nd Senate district election
Party	Candidate	Votes	%
Republican	Chris Elliott (incumbent)		
Democratic	Janet Appleby		
Write-in			
Total votes			100.00

== District 33 ==
=== Democratic primary ===
==== Candidates ====
===== Nominee =====
- Vivian Davis Figures, incumbent state senator

==== Endorsements ====
Vivian Davis Figures

Organizations

- Alabama Realtors PAC

=== General election ===
==== Results ====
2026 Alabama's 33rd Senate district election
Party	Candidate	Votes	%
Democratic	Vivian Davis Figures (incumbent)		
Write-in			
Total votes			100.00

== District 34 ==
=== Republican primary ===
==== Candidates ====
===== Nominee =====
- Rusty Glover, former state senator (2006–2018)

===== Eliminated in primary =====
- Doug Harwell, former Mobile County School Board member

===== Did not file =====
- Brett Easterbrook, state representative from the 65th district (2018–present)

===== Declined =====
- Jack W. Williams, incumbent state senator (running for Agriculture Commissioner)

==== Endorsements ====
Rusty Glover

Organizations

- Alabama Farmers Federation
- National Association for Gun Rights
Doug Harwell

Local officials

- Paul Burch, Mobile County sheriff
- Sandy Stimpson, former mayor of Mobile (2013–2025)

Organizations

- Alabama Associated Builders and Contractors
- Business Council of Alabama
- Manufacture Alabama

==== Results ====
Republican primary
Party	Candidate	Votes	%
Republican	Rusty Glover	7,187	54.55
Republican	Doug Harwell	5,987	45.45
Total votes		13,174	100.00

=== General election ===
==== Results ====
2026 Alabama's 34th Senate district election
Party	Candidate	Votes	%
Republican	Rusty Glover		
Write-in			
Total votes			100.00

== District 35 ==
=== Republican primary ===
==== Candidates ====
===== Nominee =====
- David Sessions, incumbent state senator

==== Endorsements ====
David Sessions

Organizations

- Alabama Realtors PAC
- Business Council of Alabama
- Manufacture Alabama

=== General election ===
==== Results ====
2026 Alabama's 35th Senate district election
Party	Candidate	Votes	%
Republican	David Sessions (incumbent)		
Write-in			
Total votes			100.00

== See also ==
- List of Alabama state legislatures
