= 2022 Alabama Senate election =

- November 8, 2022

All 35 seats in the Alabama State Senate 18 seats needed for a majority
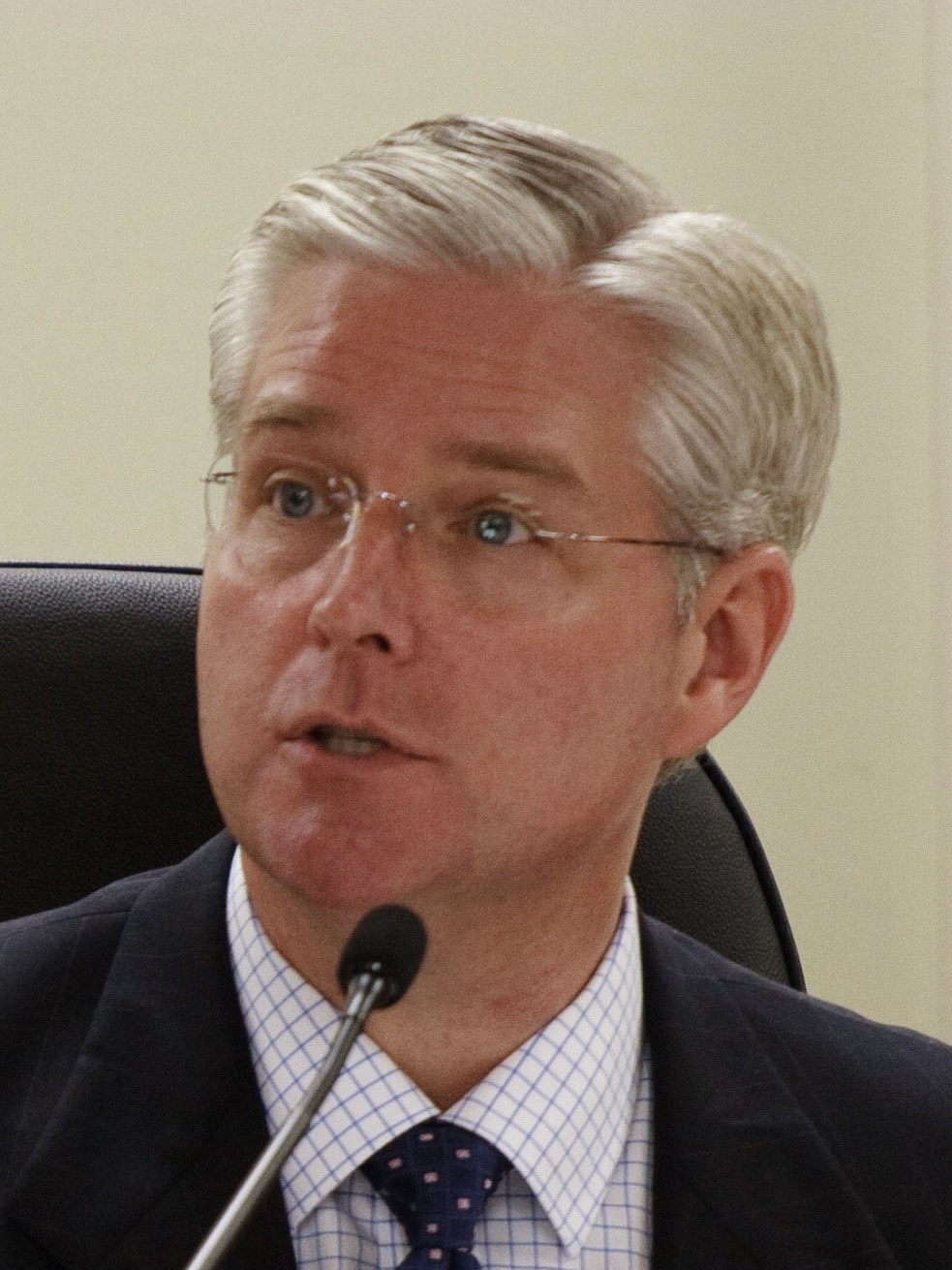

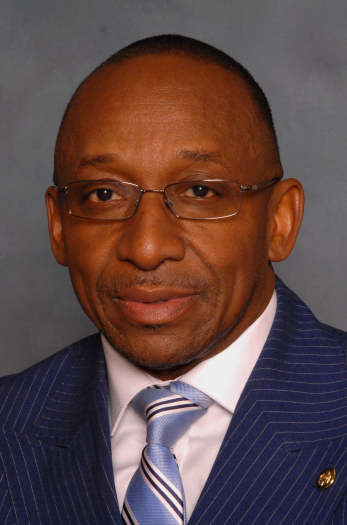
	Majority party	Minority party
Leader	Greg Reed	Bobby Singleton
Party	Republican	Democratic
Leader since	February 2, 2021	January 8, 2019
Leader's seat	5th	24th
Last election	27	8
Seats won	27	8
Seat change	Steady	Steady
Popular vote	891,805	281,312
Percentage	72.5%	22.87%
Swing	▲9.71%	▼12.18%
- Democratic hold Republican hold Republican: 50–60% 60–70% 70–80% 80–90% 90–100% Democratic: 50–60% 60–70% 80–90% 90–100% Republican: 50–60% 60–70% 70–80% 80–90% 90–100% Democratic: 50–60% 60–70% 70–80% 80–90% 90–100%
President pro tempore before election
Greg Reed
Republican
Elected President pro tempore
Greg Reed
Republican

The 2022 Alabama Senate elections took place on November 8, 2022, as part of the 2022 United States elections. Alabama voters elected state senators in all 35 of the state's Senate districts. State senators serve four-year terms in the Alabama Senate in Montgomery.

A primary election on May 24, 2022, and a runoff election on June 22, 2022, determined which candidates appear on the November 8 general election ballot for the Alabama Republican Party and the Alabama Democratic Party. Libertarian candidates were nominated by party convention. This was the first time that the Libertarian Party of Alabama was on the ballot since 2002. Primary election results can be obtained from the Alabama Secretary of State's website.

Following the 2018 election cycle, Republicans maintained effective control of the Senate with 27 members, while Democrats hold eight seats.

Republicans retained control of the Alabama Senate with 27 seats after the 2022 elections.

== Predictions ==
Source	Ranking	As of
Sabato's Crystal Ball	Safe R	May 19, 2022

== Results ==
2022 Alabama Senate election results
Party	Races	Seats		Aggregate votes		2018 general		Change	
Party	Races	No.	Percent	No.	Percent	Seats	Vote %	Seats	Vote %
Republican	29	27	77.14%	891,805	72.50%	27	62.79%	—	+9.71%
Democratic	14	8	22.86%	281,312	22.86%	8	35.05%	—	−12.19%
Libertarian	11	0	0.00%	44,240	3.60%	DNC		—	
Write-in		0	0.00%	12,736	1.04%	0	0.97%	—	−0.07%
Totals	54	35		1,230,093	100%	35	—	35	—
Turnout				1,423,409	38.60%	—	49.92%	—	−11.32%
Registered voters				3,687,753					

=== Retiring incumbents ===
==== Democrats ====
1. District 19: Priscilla Dunn retired due to health issues.
2. District 23: Malika Sanders-Fortier retired to run for governor of Alabama.

==== Republicans ====
1. District 11: Jim McClendon retired.
2. District 12: Del Marsh retired.
3. District 31: Jimmy Holley retired.

=== Incumbents defeated in primaries ===
==== Republicans ====
1. District 27: Tom Whatley lost renomination to Jay Hovey.

== Chart of Senate members ==
District	Incumbent	Party	Elected Senator	Party
1st	Tim Melson	Republican	Tim Melson	Republican
2nd	Tom Butler	Republican	Tom Butler	Republican
3rd	Arthur Orr	Republican	Arthur Orr	Republican
4th	Garlan Gudger	Republican	Garlan Gudger	Republican
5th	Greg Reed	Republican	Greg Reed	Republican
6th	Larry Stutts	Republican	Larry Stutts	Republican
7th	Sam Givhan	Republican	Sam Givhan	Republican
8th	Steve Livingston	Republican	Steve Livingston	Republican
9th	Clay Scofield	Republican	Clay Scofield	Republican
10th	Andrew Jones	Republican	Andrew Jones	Republican
11th	Jim McClendon	Republican	Lance Bell	Republican
12th	Del Marsh	Republican	Keith Kelley	Republican
13th	Randy Price	Republican	Randy Price	Republican
14th	April Weaver	Republican	April Weaver	Republican
15th	Dan Roberts	Republican	Dan Roberts	Republican
16th	J. T. Waggoner	Republican	J. T. Waggoner	Republican
17th	Shay Shelnutt	Republican	Shay Shelnutt	Republican
18th	Rodger Smitherman	Democrat	Rodger Smitherman	Democrat
19th	Priscilla Dunn	Democrat	Merika Coleman	Democrat
20th	Linda Coleman-Madison	Democrat	Linda Coleman-Madison	Democrat
21st	Gerald H. Allen	Republican	Gerald H. Allen	Republican
22nd	Greg Albritton	Republican	Greg Albritton	Republican
23rd	Malika Sanders-Fortier	Democrat	Robert Stewart	Democrat
24th	Bobby D. Singleton	Democrat	Bobby D. Singleton	Democrat
25th	Will Barfoot	Republican	Will Barfoot	Republican
26th	Kirk Hatcher	Democrat	Kirk Hatcher	Democrat
27th	Tom Whatley	Republican	Jay Hovey	Republican
28th	Billy Beasley	Democrat	Billy Beasley	Democrat
29th	Donnie Chesteen	Republican	Donnie Chesteen	Republican
30th	Clyde Chambliss	Republican	Clyde Chambliss	Republican
31st	Jimmy Holley	Republican	Josh Carnley	Republican
32nd	Chris Elliott	Republican	Chris Elliott	Republican
33rd	Vivian Davis Figures	Democrat	Vivian Davis Figures	Democrat
34th	Jack Williams	Republican	Jack Williams	Republican
35th	David Sessions	Republican	David Sessions	Republican

== Closest races ==
Seats where the margin of victory was under 10%:

District	Winner	Margin
District 23	Democratic	8.79%

== Detailed results ==
=== District 1 ===
Second term incumbent Republican Senate Tim Melson had represented the Alabama Senate 1st District since November 2014. He was challenged by construction manager John Sutherland in the Republican primary after Sutherland sued to stop a 2-cent gas tax extension from being pushed through by the Lauderdale County Agricultural Authority, headed by Tim Melson, in order to build an event center just outside the city of Florence, Alabama. Melson defeated Sutherland by a margin of almost 40 points. No Democrats or Libertarians filed to run in the general election, leaving Melson unopposed in the general election.

2022 Alabama Senate general election, 1st District
Party	Candidate	Votes	%
Republican	Tim Melson (incumbent)	35,480	97.94%
Write-in		748	2.06%
Total votes		36,228	100
Republican hold			

2022 Alabama House of Representatives Republican primary election, 1st District
Party	Candidate	Votes	%
Republican	Tim Melson (incumbent)	16,564	69.23%
Republican	John Sutherland	7,361	30.77%
Total votes		23,925	100%

==== Endorsements ====
Tim Melson

Organizations

- Manufacture Alabama

PACs

- Alabama REALTORSPAC
- Alabama RetailPAC
- FarmPAC
- ForestPAC
- NFIB AlabamaPAC
John Sutherland

Organizations

- Stand for Health Freedom

=== District 2 ===
First term incumbent Republican senator Tom Butler had represented the 2nd District since November 2018. He ran for reelection. Former state senator Bill Holtzclaw challenged Butler in the primary for his old seat, citing a "lack of communication" in the district during the current term. Butler defeated Holtzclaw by a margin of 20 points in the primary. PROJECTXYZ founder and former Huntsville Chamber of Commerce Chair Kim Caudle Lewis contested the district in the general election.

2022 Alabama Senate general election, 2nd District
Party	Candidate	Votes	%
Republican	Tom Butler (incumbent)	25,951	55.52%
Democratic	Kim Caudle Lewis	20,749	44.39%
Write-in		43	0.09%
Total votes		46,743	100%
Republican hold			

2022 Alabama House of Representatives Republican primary election, 2nd District
Party	Candidate	Votes	%
Republican	Tom Butler (incumbent)	9,850	59.20%
Republican	Bill Holtzclaw	6,789	40.80%
Total votes		16,639	100%

==== Endorsements ====
Tom Butler

Organizations

- Manufacture Alabama

PACs

- Alabama REALTORSPAC
- Alabama RetailPAC
- FarmPAC
- ForestPAC
- NFIB AlabamaPAC
Bill Holtzclaw

Organizations

- Stand for Health Freedom
Kim Caudle Lewis

PACs

- The Collective PAC
- Persistence PAC

Unions

- AFL–CIO
- United Auto Workers

=== District 3 ===
Fourth term incumbent Republican senator Arthur Orr had represented Alabama Senate 2nd District since November 2006. He ran for reelection. Retired electrical engineer Rick Chandler was nominated by the Libertarian Party and challenged Orr in the general election.

2022 Alabama Senate general election, 3rd District
Party	Candidate	Votes	%
Republican	Arthur Orr (incumbent)	30,578	86.49%
Libertarian	Rick Chandler	4,566	12.91%
Write-in		211	0.60%
Total votes		35,355	100
Republican hold			

==== Endorsements ====
Arthur Orr

Organizations

- Manufacture Alabama

PACs

- Alabama REALTORSPAC
- FarmPAC
- ForestPAC
- NFIB AlabamaPAC
Rick Chandler

Organizations

- Alabama Cannabis Coalition
- LetBamaVote.org

Unions

- AFL–CIO
- United Auto Workers

=== District 4 ===
First term incumbent Republican senator Garlan Gudger ran unopposed.

2022 Alabama Senate election, 4th district
Party	Candidate	Votes	%
Republican	Garlan Gudger (incumbent)	38,265	99.20%
Write-in		307	0.80%
Total votes		38,572	100
Republican hold			

==== Endorsements ====
Garlan Gudger

Organizations

- Manufacture Alabama

PACs

- Alabama REALTORSPAC
- FarmPAC
- ForestPAC
- NFIB AlabamaPAC

=== District 5 ===
Third term incumbent and President pro tempore Greg Reed ran unopposed.

2022 Alabama Senate election, 5th district
Party	Candidate	Votes	%
Republican	Greg Reed (incumbent)	36,159	99.19%
Write-in		296	0.81%
Total votes		36,455	100
Republican hold			

==== Endorsements ====
Greg Reed

Organizations

- Manufacture Alabama

PACs

- Alabama REALTORSPAC
- FarmPAC
- ForestPAC
- NFIB AlabamaPAC

Unions

- AFL-CIO
- United Auto Workers

=== District 6 ===
Second term incumbent Republican senator Larry Stutts had represented Alabama Senate 6th District since November 2014. United States Navy veteran Kyle Richard-Garrison was nominated by the Libertarian Party and challenged Stutts in the general election.

2022 Alabama Senate general election, 6th District
Party	Candidate	Votes	%
Republican	Larry Stutts (incumbent)	30,883	86.73%
Libertarian	Kyle Richard-Garrison	4,598	12.91%
Write-in		129	0.36%
Total votes		35,610	100%
Republican hold			

==== Endorsements ====
Larry Stutts

PACs

- Alabama REALTORSPAC
- FarmPAC
- ForestPAC
- NFIB AlabamaPAC
Kyle Richard-Garrison

Organizations

- Alabama Cannabis Coalition

Unions

- AFL–CIO
- United Auto Workers

=== District 7 ===
First term incumbent Republican senator Sam Givhan had represented the 7th District since November 2018. Huntsville resident and University of Montevallo alumnus Korey Wilson challenged Givhan in the general election.

2022 Alabama Senate general election, 7th District
Party	Candidate	Votes	%
Republican	Sam Givhan (incumbent)	29,095	62.65%
Democratic	Korey Wilson	17,295	37.24%
Write-in		52	0.11%
Total votes		46,442	100%
Republican hold			

==== Endorsements ====
Sam Givhan

Organizations

- Manufacture Alabama

PACs

- Alabama REALTORSPAC
- FarmPAC
- ForestPAC
- NFIB AlabamaPAC
Korey Wilson

Organizations

- Run for Something

PACs

- The Collective PAC

Unions

- AFL–CIO
- United Auto Workers

=== District 8 ===
Second term incumbent Republican senator Steve Livingston ran unopposed.

2022 Alabama Senate election, 8th district
Party	Candidate	Votes	%
Republican	Steve Livingston (incumbent)	33,758	98.21%
Write-in		614	1.79%
Total votes		34,372	100
Republican hold			

==== Endorsements ====
Steve Livingston

Organizations

- Manufacture Alabama

PACs

- Alabama REALTORSPAC
- FarmPAC
- ForestPAC
- NFIB AlabamaPAC

=== District 9 ===
Third term incumbent Republican senator Clay Scofield ran unopposed.

2022 Alabama Senate election, 9th district
Party	Candidate	Votes	%
Republican	Clay Scofield (incumbent)	32,709	98.30%
Write-in		566	1.70%
Total votes		33,201	100
Republican hold			

==== Endorsements ====
Clay Scofield

Organizations

- Manufacture Alabama

PACs

- Alabama REALTORSPAC
- FarmPAC
- ForestPAC
- NFIB AlabamaPAC

=== District 10 ===
First term incumbent Republican senator Andrew Jones ran unopposed.

2022 Alabama Senate election, 10th district
Party	Candidate	Votes	%
Republican	Andrew Jones (incumbent)	32,153	98.17%
Write-in		598	1.83%
Total votes		32,751	100
Republican hold			

==== Endorsements ====
Andrew Jones

Organizations

- Manufacture Alabama

PACs

- Alabama REALTORSPAC
- ForestPAC
- NFIB AlabamaPAC

=== District 11 ===
Two-term senator Jim McClendon announced that he would retire following the 2022 elections. Municipal court judge and city attorney Lance Bell along with federal prison chaplain Michael Wright ran in the primary to replace McClendon. Bell stomped Wright in the primary. Since no Democrats or Libertarians filed to run for the seat, Bell ran unopposed in the general election.

2022 Alabama Senate general election, 11th District
Party	Candidate	Votes	%
Republican	Lance Bell	33,505	98.41%
Write-in		543	1.59%
Total votes		34,048	100
Republican hold			

2022 Alabama Senate Republican primary election, 11th District
Party	Candidate	Votes	%
Republican	Lance Bell	12,586	72.97%
Republican	Michael Wright	4,663	27.03%
Total votes			100

==== Endorsements ====
Lance Bell

Organizations

- Stand for Health Freedom

PACs

- Alabama REALTORSPAC
- FarmPAC
- ForestPAC
- ProgressPAC

=== District 12 ===
Fifth term Republican senator Del Marsh had represented the 12th District since November 1998. He announced his retirement following the 2022 elections. Lawyer Wendy Ghee Draper, real estate firm owner Keith Kelley and Weaver mayor Wayne Willis all ran in the primary to replace Marsh. During the campaign, a ballot challenge was filed against Draper due to her past donations to prominent Democrats. However, the Alabama Republican Party allowed her to remain on the ballot. In the primary, no candidate more than half of the total vote, so Draper and Kelley advanced to a runoff. In the runoff, Kelley defeated Draper by a ten-point margin. Certified public accountant Danny McCullars was nominated by the Democratic Party and contested the district in the general election.

2022 Alabama Senate general election, 12th District
Party	Candidate	Votes	%
Republican	Keith Kelley	28,786	73.61%
Democratic	Danny McCullars	10,271	26.26%
Write-in		49	0.13%
Total votes		39,106	100
Republican hold			

2022 Alabama Senate Republican primary runoff election, 12th District
Party	Candidate	Votes	%
Republican	Wendy Ghee Draper	5,235	44.78%
Republican	Keith Kelley	6,456	55.22%
Total votes		11,691	100%

2022 Alabama Senate Republican primary election, 12th District
Party	Candidate	Votes	%
Republican	Wendy Ghee Draper	7,083	39.28%
Republican	Keith Kelley	6,387	35.42%
Republican	Wayne Willis	4,560	25.29%
Total votes		18,030	100

==== Endorsements ====
Keith Kelley

Organizations

- Stand for Health Freedom

PACs

- Alabama REALTORSPAC
- ForestPAC
- NFIB AlabamaPAC
- ProgressPAC
Danny McCullars

Unions

- AFL–CIO
- United Auto Workers

=== District 13 ===
First term incumbent Republican senator Randy Price had represented the 13th District since November 2018. He ran for reelection. Retired firefighter and pastor John Coker challenged price in the primary election. Price defeated Coker in the primary. No Democrats or Libertarians filed to run for this seat, leaving Price unopposed in the general election.

2022 Alabama Senate general election, 13th District
Party	Candidate	Votes	%
Republican	Randy Price (incumbent)	31,759	98.15%
Write-in		597	1.85%
Total votes		32,356	100
Republican hold			

2022 Alabama Senate Republican primary election, 13th District
Party	Candidate	Votes	%
Republican	Randy Price (incumbent)	14,888	78.66%
Republican	John Coker	4,039	21.34%
Total votes			100

==== Endorsements ====
Randy Price

Organizations

- Manufacture Alabama

PACs

- Alabama REALTORSPAC
- Alabama RetailPAC
- FarmPAC
- ForestPAC
- NFIB AlabamaPAC
John Coker

Organizations

- Stand for Health Freedom

=== District 14 ===
April Weaver ran unopposed for her first full term after being appointed to succeed Cam Ward in 2021.

2022 Alabama Senate general election, 14th District
Party	Candidate	Votes	%
Republican	April Weaver (incumbent)	31,917	97.40%
Write-in		852	2.60%
Total votes		32,769	100
Republican hold			

==== Endorsements ====
April Weaver

Organizations

- Manufacture Alabama

PACs

- Alabama REALTORSPAC
- FarmPAC
- ForestPAC
- NFIB AlabamaPAC
- ProgressPAC

Unions

- AFL-CIO
- United Auto Workers

=== District 15 ===
First term incumbent Republican Senate Dan Roberts had represented Alabama Senate 15th District since November 2018. Urologist Brian Christine challenged Roberts in the Republican primary. Roberts defeated Christine by a spread of twenty points. Michael Crump was nominated by the Libertarian Party and contested the district in the general election.

2022 Alabama Senate general election, 15th District
Party	Candidate	Votes	%
Republican	Dan Roberts (incumbent)	35,704	85.55%
Libertarian	Michael Crump	5,771	13.83%
Write-in		260	0.62%
Total votes		41,735	100
Republican hold			

2022 Alabama Senate Republican primary election, 15th District
Party	Candidate	Votes	%
Republican	Dan Roberts (incumbent)	11,980	59.33%
Republican	Brian Christine	8,212	40.67%
Total votes		20,192	100

==== Endorsements ====
Dan Roberts

Organizations

- Manufacture Alabama

PACs

- Alabama REALTORSPAC
- Alabama RetailPAC
- FarmPAC
- ForestPAC
- NFIB AlabamaPAC
Brian Christine

Organizations

- Stand for Health Freedom
Michael Crump

Unions

- AFL–CIO
- United Auto Workers

=== District 16 ===
Ninth term incumbent Republican senator J. T. Waggoner ran unopposed in the 16th District, which he had represented since February 1990. Waggoner had been in and out of Alabama government continuously since 1966.

2022 Alabama Senate general election, 16th District
Party	Candidate	Votes	%
Republican	J. T. "Jabo" Waggoner (incumbent)	33,719	96.11%
Write-in		1,365	3.89%
Total votes		35,084	100
Republican hold			

==== Endorsements ====
Jabo Waggoner

Organizations

- Manufacture Alabama

PACs

- Alabama REALTORSPAC
- FarmPAC
- ForestPAC
- NFIB AlabamaPAC

Unions

- United Auto Workers

=== District 17 ===
Third term incumbent Republican Senateor Shay Shelnutt had represented the 17th District since November 2018. He ran for reelection. United States Marine Corps veteran Mike Dunn challenged Shelnutt in the primary after withdrawing from the 2022 United States Senate election in Alabama. Shelnutt defeated Dunn by a forty-point margin in that election. John Fortenberry was nominated by the Libertarian Party and contested the district in the general election.

2022 Alabama Senate general election, 17th District
Party	Candidate	Votes	%
Republican	Shay Shelnutt (incumbent)	38,137	90.95%
Libertarian	John Fortenberry	3,675	8.76%
Write-in		122	0.29%
Total votes		41,934	100
Republican hold			

2022 Alabama Senate Republican primary election, 17th District
Party	Candidate	Votes	%
Republican	Shay Shelnutt (incumbent)	14,338	68.53%
Republican	Mike Dunn	6,583	31.47%
Total votes		20,921	100

==== Endorsements ====
Shay Shelnutt

Organizations

- Manufacture Alabama

PACs

- Alabama REALTORSPAC
- Alabama RetailPAC
- FarmPAC
- ForestPAC
- NFIB AlabamaPAC
John Fortenberry

Unions

- AFL–CIO
- United Auto Workers

=== District 18 ===
Eighth term incumbent Democratic senator Rodger Smitherman ran unopposed; he had represented the 18th District since February 1994.

2022 Alabama Senate general election, 18th District
Party	Candidate	Votes	%
Democratic	Rodger Smitherman (incumbent)	28,642	98.78%
Write-in		355	1.22
Total votes		28,997	100
Democratic hold			

==== Endorsements ====
Rodger Smitherman

Organizations

- Manufacture Alabama

PACs

- Alabama REALTORSPAC
- FarmPAC
- ForestPAC
- NFIB AlabamaPAC

Unions

- AFL-CIO
- United Auto Workers

=== District 19 ===
Fourth term Democratic senator Priscilla Dunn had represented Alabama Senate 19th District since 2009. She announced she would not run in the 2022 elections after her failing health caused her to miss most of the preceding legislative session. State Representatives Louise Alexander and Merika Coleman ran in the primary to replace Dunn. Coleman beat Alexander in the primary. Automotive technician Danny Wilson was nominated by the Libertarian Party and contested the district in the general election.

2022 Alabama Senate general election, 19th District
Party	Candidate	Votes	%
Democratic	Merika Coleman	26,369	86.52%
Libertarian	Danny Wilson	3,904	12.81%
Write-in		204	0.67%
Total votes		30,477	100
Democratic hold			

2022 Alabama Senate Democratic primary election, 19th District
Party	Candidate	Votes	%
Democratic	Louise Alexander	4,002	27.84%
Democratic	Merika Coleman	10,371	72.16%
Total votes		14,373	100

==== Endorsements ====
Merika Coleman

PACs

- Alabama REALTORSPAC
- ProgressPAC

Unions

- AFL–CIO
- United Auto Workers
Danny Wilson

Organizations

- Alabama Cannabis Coalition
- LetBamaVote.org

=== District 20 ===
Fifth term incumbent Democratic senator Linda Coleman-Madison had represented Alabama Senate 20th District since February 2006. She was challenged by perennial candidate Rodney Huntley in the primary election. Coleman-Madison beat Huntley. No Republicans or Libertarians filed to run for this seat, leaving Coleman-Madison unopposed in the general election.

2022 Alabama Senate general election, 20th District
Party	Candidate	Votes	%
Democratic	Linda Coleman-Madison (incumbent)	27,567	98.54%
Write-in		409	1.46%
Total votes		27,941	100
Democratic hold			

2022 Alabama Senate Democratic primary election, 20th District
Party	Candidate	Votes	%
Democratic	Linda Coleman-Madison (incumbent)	11,267	87.29%
Democratic	Rodney Huntley	1,640	12.71%
Total votes		12,907	100

==== Endorsements ====
Linda Coleman-Madison

Organizations

- Manufacture Alabama

PACs

- Alabama REALTORSPAC
- Alabama RetailPAC
- NFIB AlabamaPAC
- ProgressPAC

Unions

- AFL-CIO
- United Auto Workers

=== District 21 ===
Third term incumbent Republican senator Gerald Allen had represented the 21st District since November 2010. He ran for reelection. Gary, Indiana native and Democratic activist Lisa Ward was nominated by the Democratic Party and contested the district in the general election.

2022 Alabama Senate general election, 21st District
Party	Candidate	Votes	%
Republican	Gerald Allen (incumbent)	21,962	65.97%
Democratic	Lisa Ward	11,198	33.63%
Write-in		132	0.40%
Total votes		33,239	100
Republican hold			

==== Endorsements ====
Gerald Allen

Organizations

- Manufacture Alabama

PACs

- Alabama REALTORSPAC
- FarmPAC
- ForestPAC
- NFIB AlabamaPAC
Lisa Ward

Individuals

- Tabitha Isner, vice chair of the Alabama Democratic Party and Democratic nominee for Alabama's 2nd congressional district in 2018
- Don Siegelman, former governor of Alabama (1999-2003)
- Bobby Singleton, member of the Alabama State Senate from the 24th District (2005-Present) and Minority Leader of the Alabama Senate (2019-Present)

PACs

- Persistence PAC

Unions

- AFL–CIO
- United Auto Workers

=== District 22 ===
Second term incumbent Republican senator Greg Albritton had represented the 22nd District since November 2018. He ran for reelection. Retired United States Army chaplain Stephen Sexton challenged Albritton in the primary, receiving one third of the vote.

2022 Alabama Senate general election, 22nd District
Party	Candidate	Votes	%
Republican	Greg Albritton (incumbent)	32,880	98.79%
Write-in		404	1.21%
Total votes		33,177	100
Republican hold			

2022 Alabama Senate Republican primary election, 22nd District
Party	Candidate	Votes	%
Republican	Greg Albritton (incumbent)	12,360	66.11%
Republican	Stephen Sexton	6,337	33.89%
Total votes		18,697	100

==== Endorsements ====
Greg Albritton

Organizations

- Manufacture Alabama

PACs

- Alabama REALTORSPAC
- Alabama RetailPAC
- ForestPAC
- NFIB AlabamaPAC
Stephen Sexton

Organizations

- Stand for Health Freedom

=== District 23 ===
First term Democratic senator Malika Sanders-Fortier retired to run in the 2022 Alabama gubernatorial election, eventually losing in a runoff to Yolanda Flowers. Former Selma mayor Darrio Melton, former Democratic state senator and Sanders-Fortier's father Hank Sanders, former candidate for Selma mayor Thayer Spencer and accountant Robert Stewart all ran in the primary to replace Sanders-Fortier. However, no candidate won more than half of the vote so Sanders and Stewart advanced to a runoff. In the runoff, Stewart defeated Sanders by about ten percentage points. Butler County School Board member Michael Nimmer was nominated by the Republican Party, and political consultant Portia Shepherd was nominated by the Libertarian Party to run for the seat.

2022 Alabama Senate general election, 23rd District
Party	Candidate	Votes	%
Democratic	Robert L. Stewart	25,953	53.39%
Republican	Michael Nimmer	21,682	44.60%
Libertarian	Portia Shepherd	959	1.97%
Write-in		18	0.04%
Total votes		48,612	100
Democratic hold			

2022 Alabama Senate Democratic primary runoff election, 23rd District
Party	Candidate	Votes	%
Democratic	Hank Sanders	6,602	44.44%
Democratic	Robert L. Stewart	8,255	55.56%
Total votes		14,857	100%

2022 Alabama Senate Democratic primary election, 23rd District
Party	Candidate	Votes	%
Democratic	Darrio Melton	5,543	23.29%
Democratic	Hank Sanders	10,634	44.68%
Democratic	Thayer "Bear" Spencer	456	1.91%
Democratic	Robert Stewart	7,166	30.11%
Total votes		23,799	100

==== Endorsements ====
Robert Stewart

Organizations

- Alabama Forestry Association

PACs

- Alabama REALTORSPAC
- ProgressPAC

Unions

- AFL-CIO
- United Auto Workers
Portia Shepherd

Organizations

- Alabama Cannabis Coalition

=== District 24 ===
Fifth term incumbent Democratic senator and Minority Leader Bobby Singleton had represented the 24th District since 2005. Demopolis native Richard Benderson was nominated by the Libertarian Party and challenged Singleton in the general election.

2022 Alabama Senate general election, 24th District
Party	Candidate	Votes	%
Democratic	Bobby Singleton (incumbent)	25,440	82.04%
Libertarian	Richard Benderson	5,311	17.13%
Write-in		259	0.83%
Total votes		31,010	100
Democratic hold			

==== Endorsements ====
Bobby Singleton

Organizations

- Manufacture Alabama

PACs

- Alabama REALTORSPAC
- ForestPAC
- NFIB AlabamaPAC

Unions

- AFL–CIO
- United Auto Workers
Richard Benderson

Organizations

- Alabama Cannabis Coalition

=== District 25 ===
First term incumbent Republican senator Will Barfoot had represented the 25th District since November 2018. Retired Alabama Department of Public Health statistician and Holt native Louie Albert Woolbright was nominated by the Libertarian Party and contested the district in the general election.

2022 Alabama Senate general election, 25th District
Party	Candidate	Votes	%
Republican	Will Barfoot (incumbent)	32,640	85.27%
Libertarian	Louie Albert Woolbright	5,394	14.09%
Write-in		243	0.64%
Total votes		38,277	100
Republican hold			

==== Endorsements ====
Will Barfoot

Organizations

- Manufacture Alabama

PACs

- Alabama REALTORSPAC
- FarmPAC
- ForestPAC
- NFIB AlabamaPAC
Louie Albert Woolbright

Organizations

- Alabama Cannabis Coalition

Unions

- AFL–CIO
- United Auto Workers

=== District 26 ===
Kirk Hatcher ran for his first full term unopposed after succeeding David Burkette in 2021.

2022 Alabama Senate general election, 26th District
Party	Candidate	Votes	%
Democratic	Kirk Hatcher (incumbent)	25,901	98.47%
Write-in		403	1.53%
Total votes		26,304	100
Democratic hold			

==== Endorsements ====
Kirk Hatcher

Organizations

- Manufacture Alabama

PACs

- Alabama REALTORSPAC
- ProgressPAC

Unions

- AFL-CIO
- United Auto Workers

=== District 27 ===
Three term incumbent Republican senator Tom Whatley was controversially defeated in the primary by Auburn city councilman Jay Hovey by a single vote. Shortly after, a New York Times editorial emerged telling a story of how a creative writing professor at Auburn University had convinced a substantial amount of avowed Democrats to vote in the Republican primary for Hovey due to Whatley's "abhorrent" record on legislation regarding abortion. After this article emerged, Whatley declared himself "the rightful winner" of the election and produced a testimony from a single voter still registered in Georgia who stated they would have voted for Whatley if they were able. However, Whatley soon conceded the election to Hovey before an official recount could be conducted at the Alabama Republican Party headquarters. This election will likely lead to the Alabama Legislature passing laws requiring closed primary elections in last legislative session of the 2022 calendar year. United States Army Human Resources Officer Sherri Reese was nominated by the Democratic Party and challenged Hovey in the general election.

2022 Alabama Senate general election, 27th District
Party	Candidate	Votes	%
Republican	Jay Hovey	26,014	70.17%
Democratic	Sherri Reese	10,996	29.66%
Write-in		63	0.17%
Total votes		37,073	100
Republican hold			

2022 Alabama Senate Republican primary election, 27th District
Party	Candidate	Votes	%
Republican	Jay Hovey	8,373	50.01%
Republican	Tom Whatley (incumbent)	8,372	49.99%
Total votes		16,745	100

==== Endorsements ====
Jay Hovey

Organizations

- Alabama Forestry Association

PACs

- Alabama REALTORSPAC
- ProgressPAC
Tom Whatley

Organizations

- Manufacture Alabama

PACs

- ~~Alabama REALTORSPAC~~ (switched endorsement to Hovey)
- Alabama RetailPAC
- NFIB AlabamaPAC
Sherri Reese

Unions

- AFL–CIO
- United Auto Workers

=== District 28 ===
Third term incumbent Democratic senator Billy Beasley had represented the 20th District since November 2010. Tuskegee mayor pro tempore Frank "Chris" Lee challenged Beasley in the primary. Beasley narrowly defeated Lee in the primary election. Dothan native David Boatwright was nominated by the Libertarian Party and contested the district in the general election.

2022 Alabama Senate general election, 28th District
Party	Candidate	Votes	%
Democratic	Billy Beasley (incumbent)	21,252	80.72%
Libertarian	David Boatwright	4,837	18.37%
Write-in		240	0.91%
Total votes		26,329	100
Democratic hold			

2022 Alabama Senate Democratic primary election, 28th District
Party	Candidate	Votes	%
Democratic	Billy Beasley (incumbent)	6,752	61.27%
Democratic	Frank "Chris" Lee	4,267	38.72%
Total votes		11,019	100

==== Endorsements ====
Billy Beasley

Organizations

- Manufacture Alabama

PACs

- Alabama REALTORSPAC
- Alabama RetailPAC
- FarmPAC
- ForestPAC
- NFIB AlabamaPAC
- ProgressPAC

Unions

- AFL-CIO
- United Auto Workers
David Boatwright

Organizations

- Alabama Cannabis Coalition
- LetBamaVote.org

=== District 29 ===
First term Republican senator Donnie Chesteen had represented the 29th District since November 2018. Former state representative Nathan Mathis was nominated by the Democratic Party, and Daleville native Floyd "Pete" McBroom was nominated by the Libertarian Party to run for the seat.

2022 Alabama Senate general election, 29th District
Party	Candidate	Votes	%
Republican	Donnie Chesteen (incumbent)	31,576	81.36%
Democratic	Nathan Mathis	6,476	16.69%
Libertarian	Floyd "Pete" McBroom	737	1.90%
Write-in		20	0.05%
Total votes		38,809	100
Republican hold			

==== Endorsements ====
Donnie Chesteen

Organizations

- Manufacture Alabama

PACs

- Alabama REALTORSPAC
- FarmPAC
- ForestPAC
- NFIB AlabamaPAC
Nathan Mathis

Unions

- AFL–CIO
- United Auto Workers
Floyd "Pete" McBroom

Organizations

- Alabama Cannabis Coalition
- LetBamaVote.org

=== District 30 ===
Second term incumbent Republican Senate Clyde Chambliss haf represented the 30th District since 2014. He ran unopposed.

2022 Alabama Senate general election, 30th District
Party	Candidate	Votes	%
Republican	Clyde Chambliss Jr. (incumbent)	29,225	97.98%
Write-in		602	2.02%
Total votes		29,827	100
Republican hold			

==== Endorsements ====
Clyde Chambliss

Organizations

- Manufacture Alabama

PACs

- Alabama REALTORSPAC
- FarmPAC
- ForestPAC
- NFIB AlabamaPAC

=== District 31 ===
Sixth term incumbent Republican senator Jimmy Holley had represented the 31st District since November 1998. He announced his retirement following the 2022 election cycle. Coffee County Commissioner Josh Carnley, aircraft mechanic "Stormin'" Norman Horton, and State Representative Mike Jones all ran in the primary to replace Holley. Carnley cleared the field without needing a runoff. No Democrats or Libertarians filed to run for the seat, leaving Carnley unopposed in the general election.

2022 Alabama Senate general election, 31st District
Party	Candidate	Votes	%
Republican	Josh Carnley	30,618	98.88%
Write-in		348	1.12%
Total votes		30,966	100
Republican hold			

2022 Alabama Senate Republican primary election, 31st District
Party	Candidate	Votes	%
Republican	Josh Carnley	12,446	50.21%
Republican	"Stormin'" Norman Horton	2,332	9.41%
Republican	Mike Jones Jr.	10,010	40.38%
Total votes		24,788	100

==== Endorsements ====
Josh Carnley

Organizations

- Stand for Health Freedom

PACs

- Alabama REALTORSPAC
- NFIB AlabamaPAC
- ProgressPAC
Mike Jones

Organizations

- Manufacture Alabama

PACs

- ~~Alabama REALTORSPAC~~ (switched endorsement to Carnley)
- FarmPAC
- ProgressPAC
- TRUK PAC

=== District 32 ===
First term incumbent Republican senator Chris Elliott ran unopposed in the 32nd district.

2022 Alabama Senate general election, 32nd District
Party	Candidate	Votes	%
Republican	Chris Elliott (incumbent)	41,073	98.16%
Write-in		768	1.84%
Total votes		41,841	100
Republican hold			

==== Endorsements ====
Chris Elliott

Organizations

- Manufacture Alabama

PACs

- Alabama REALTORSPAC
- FarmPAC
- ForestPAC
- NFIB AlabamaPAC

=== District 33 ===
Seventh term incumbent Democratic senator Vivian Figures had represented the 29th District since 1997. Retired United States Navy CO and commercial real estate broker Pete Riehm was nominated by the Republican Party and contested the district in the general election.

2022 Alabama Senate general election, 33rd District
Party	Candidate	Votes	%
Democratic	Vivian Figures (incumbent)	23,203	66.95%
Republican	Pete Riehm	11,401	32.90%
Write-in		51	0.15%
Total votes		34,655	100
Democratic hold			

==== Endorsements ====
Vivian Figures

PACs

- Alabama REALTORSPAC

Unions

- AFL–CIO
- United Auto Workers
Pete Riehm

PACs

- ForestPAC

=== District 34 ===
First term incumbent Republican senator Jack Williams ran unopposed in the 34th district.

2022 Alabama Senate general election, 34th District
Party	Candidate	Votes	%
Republican	Jack Williams (incumbent)	27,043	97.56%
Write-in		676	2.44%
Total votes		27,719	100
Republican hold			

==== Endorsements ====
Jack Williams

Organizations

- Manufacture Alabama

PACs

- Alabama REALTORSPAC
- FarmPAC
- ForestPAC
- NFIB AlabamaPAC

=== District 35 ===
First-term incumbent Republican Senator David Sessions had represented the 35th district since 2018. The Libertarian Party nominated systems analyst Clifton Hudson, who challenged Sessions in the general election.

2022 Alabama Senate general election, 35th District
Party	Candidate	Votes	%
Republican	David Sessions (incumbent)	27,133	85.30%
Libertarian	Clifton Hudson	4,488	14.11%
Write-in		189	0.59%
Total votes		31,635	100
Republican hold			

==== Endorsements ====
David Sessions

Organizations

- Manufacture Alabama

PACs

- Alabama REALTORSPAC
- FarmPAC
- ForestPAC
- NFIB AlabamaPAC
Clifton Hudson

Organizations

- Alabama Cannabis Coalition

Unions

- AFL–CIO
- United Auto Workers

== See also ==
- 2022 United States Senate election in Alabama
- 2022 United States House of Representatives elections
- 2022 United States gubernatorial elections
- 2022 Alabama lieutenant gubernatorial election
- 2022 United States state legislative elections
- 2022 Alabama House of Representatives election
- 2022 Alabama elections
- List of Alabama state legislatures
