= Phil Williams (Alabama state senator) =

American politician

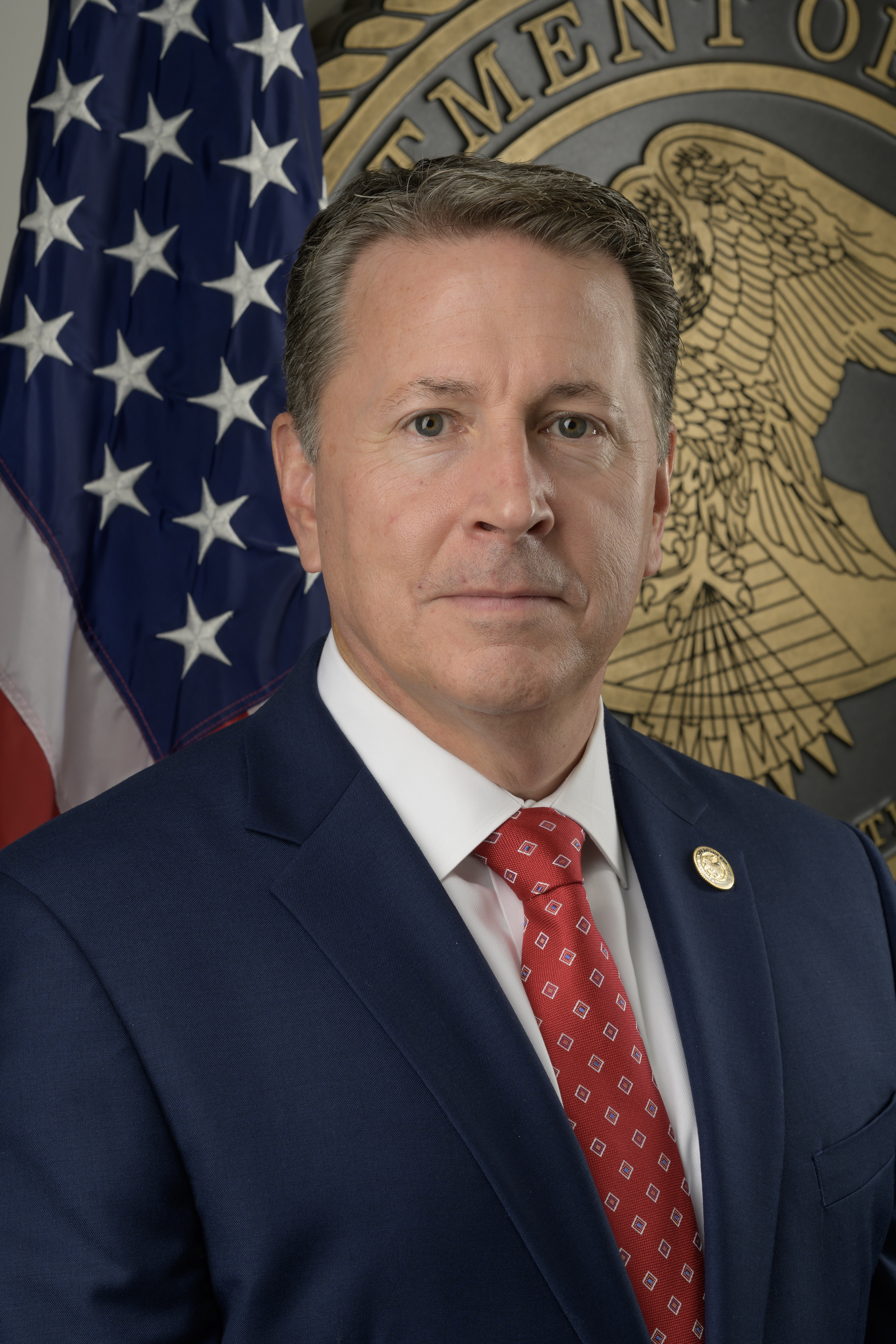

United States Attorney for the Northern District of Alabama
- Incumbent
- Assumed office May 28, 2026
- President: Donald Trump
- Preceded by: Prim F. Escalona

Member of the Alabama Senate from the 10th district
- In office 2010–2018
- Preceded by: Larry Means
- Succeeded by: Andrew Jones

Personal details
- Born: March 20, 1965 (age 61) Fort Monmouth, New Jersey, U.S.
- Party: Republican
- Spouse: Charlene Williams
- Children: 2
- Education: University of South Alabama (BS); Birmingham School of Law (JD)

Military service
- Allegiance: United States
- Branch/service: United States Army Reserve
- Years of service: 1987–2017
- Rank: Lieutenant colonel
- Battles/wars: War in Afghanistan; Iraq War

Phillip Wayne Williams Jr. (born March 20, 1965) is an American politician, radio show host and attorney from the state of Alabama. A member of the Republican Party, Williams served in the Alabama Senate from 2010 until 2018, representing the 10th district, encompassing Etowah County and parts of Cherokee County. Since leaving the state legislature, Williams has served as a policy director for the Alabama Policy Institute and hosted a conservative radio program, Rightside Radio.

On October 22, 2025, President Donald Trump nominated Williams to be the United States Attorney for the United States District Court for the Northern District of Alabama.

== Early life, education and military service ==
Williams was born in Fort Monmouth, New Jersey, on March 20, 1965. He moved homes frequently as a member of a family with close ties to the United States Army. He attended Grissom High School in Huntsville, Alabama, and, after graduation, went to the University of South Alabama. There, he was involved with the Reserve Officers' Training Corps (ROTC) and received an ROTC commission in 1987; he graduated from the university with a Bachelor of Science in 1989.

A graduate of both the Combined Arms and Service Staff School and the United States Army Command and General Staff College, Williams served part-time in the United States Army Reserve and was a part of several airborne units, as well as the 20th Special Forces Group, eventually attaining the rank of lieutenant colonel. Following the September 11 attacks, Williams served two combat tours, one in Afghanistan in 2002 and one in Iraq in 2004. He later worked in The Pentagon as a member of the Army Staff's Special Operations Division. Williams retired from military service in 2017.

Williams attended the Birmingham School of Law. He attended night classes while still working, and received his Juris Doctor in 2003.

== Career ==
=== Law and ministry work ===
From 1993-1999, Williams served as an area director for Young Life, an Evangelical youth ministry organization. He was also the chief operating officer of TaxBreak in Gadsden, Alabama, as well as the managing partner and trial attorney for Brunson & Associates. Williams later pursued his own private law practice and founded Williams & Associates, a firm based in Gadsden, in 2011. The firm is now known as Williams, Driskill, Huffstutler and King LLC, and specializes in civil law.

=== Alabama Senate (2010–2018) ===
==== 2010 election ====
In 2010, Williams, described by The Gadsden Times as a "political newcomer" at the time, ran for the Alabama Senate's 10th district as a Republican. The district included Williams' home county of Etowah County, as well as segments of Cherokee County. After defeating Paul Peloquin in the primary, Williams advanced to challenge incumbent Democratic state senator Larry Means in the general election, stating that he would "promote fiscal conservatism and limit government intervention in daily lives." According to Mike Hubbard, one state senator said that Means was so impressed with Williams, he would have voted for Williams were he not running against him. Williams met with politicians John Ross and J. T. Waggoner to discuss his campaign; with the assistance of a strategic team that included Hubbard (a future Speaker of the Alabama House of Representatives) and consultant Tim Howe, Williams worked on finding ways to introduce himself to voters.

Williams' campaign received funding from state senator Del Marsh and, over time, increased Williams' name recognition with the district's voters. However, a commissioned poll during the general election showed that Williams was struggling to narrow the gap between himself and Means. As a result, Marsh told Williams that he was unable to continue funding the campaign, with other closer, higher-profile races on the line. A month before the general election, Means was indicted in a corruption case that alleged he was involved in "a vote-buying scheme to legalize electronic gambling in Alabama." The sudden negative attention drawn towards Means led Marsh to re-establish funding for Williams' campaign. Williams ultimately defeated Means and was elected to the state Senate. After the election, Means was acquitted of his corruption charges, and said that the indictment was a major factor in his loss to Williams.

==== Tenure ====
After his inauguration, Williams supported a bill in 2011 that would remove racist language in the Alabama state constitution, including references to segregation and poll taxes. In 2012, he defended a controversial immigration bill and criticized Zayne Smith, the director of the Alabama Coalition for Immigrant Justice, for referring to Alabama as a "hateful state" because of the bill, claiming she was misrepresenting the state of Alabama. Williams authored SB-117, a bill that became law creating the position of an information technology secretary to restructure the state's IT functions, in 2013.

In the 2014 election cycle, Williams faced a rematch against Means, who was seeking to reclaim his old Senate seat. During the campaign, Means accused Williams of lying about voting to reduce his own salary, which The Gadsden Times said was a false accusation and that "Means' accusations bounce off Williams and splatter all over Means." Williams ultimately prevailed against Means in the general election, by a margin of four percentage points.

An outspoken opponent of abortion, Williams first mounted an effort to define life as beginning at fertilization, and to classify abortion under the same laws as murder, in 2011. To this end, he proposed a bill that passed in the Senate, but died in the Alabama House of Representatives on the last day of the session. Williams voted for stricter regulations on abortion clinics in 2013. In 2016, Williams sponsored SB363, a bill outlawing dismemberment abortions, which was later passed in both the state Senate and House of Representatives. The American Civil Liberties Union filed a lawsuit over the passing of SB363, which Williams criticized, calling it a "misguided legal challenge." The next year, Williams also supported a bill for a state constitutional amendment declaring the right to life for unborn children.

In January 2016, the Alabama Political Reporter published a story that claimed Williams had retained 43 consulting clients with his law firm on an ethics filing in 2014. Williams denied any wrongdoing and claimed that the blogger who wrote the report, Bill Britt, had made unfounded attacks against his character. He also asked the Alabama Ethics Commission to review his client list. The Alabama Political Reporter reported in June 2016 that the Alabama Law Enforcement Agency had opened a criminal investigation into Williams, which he had denied. In July 2018, former Governor Robert J. Bentley gave testimony that affirmed Williams was under investigation at the time. Williams was eventually cleared of wrongdoing by the Alabama Ethics Commission.

Williams was interviewed by then-Governor Robert Bentley for the United States Senate seat vacated by the resignation of Jeff Sessions in 2016, but was ultimately not selected. Williams was also considered for the position of Attorney General of Alabama in 2017, as the incumbent Luther Strange resigned to be appointed to the aforementioned U.S. Senate seat. Although Williams was interviewed, he was also not chosen for this office. In January 2017, Williams filed the Alabama Privacy Act, described as a "bathroom bill" by Alabama Political Reporter. Williams served in the Alabama State Legislature at the same time as Representative Phil Williams, both Republicans who coincidentally shared the same name. The two disagreed on HB-317, a 2018 bill exempting "economic development professionals" from requiring registration as lobbyists; Senator Williams sponsored the bill in the Alabama Senate, while Representative Williams opposed it in the Alabama House of Representatives.

In May 2017, Williams announced that he would not seek re-election in 2018, and would be stepping away from seeking public office in the future. According to Williams, this was due to his support for term limits. He was succeeded by Andrew Jones. 1819 News described Williams as "one of the most conservative members of the Senate" during his tenure, based on his efforts to promote school choice and tough-on-crime reforms.

=== Rightside Radio and Alabama Policy Institute ===
After leaving the Alabama Senate, Williams became Chief Policy Officer of the Alabama Policy Institute. Williams was involved in the launching of the institute's media wing; he founded the conservative talk radio program Rightside Radio, which he currently hosts. The program was created after fellow radio host Dale Jackson of WVNN-FM asked Williams to fill the slot that previously belonged to a syndication of The Rush Limbaugh Show, whose host, Rush Limbaugh, died in February 2021. Williams derived the name for Rightside Radio from a blog he wrote while in office titled "Views from the Right Side," and officially launched the program in July 2021. Williams hosts Rightside Radio from his law office in Gadsden, Alabama.

Williams also publishes a weekly column on 1819 News, a magazine that he was involved in the development of. Williams released an article on January 17, 2022, criticizing Governor Kay Ivey, Birmingham mayor Randall Woodfin, and Springville mayor and gubernatorial candidate Dave Thomas, accusing them of "[providing] cover for breaking the law," specifically in reference to gambling and marijuana offenses. In response, Woodfin posted a Tweet stating that he "would not be lectured" by Williams, and referenced a Facebook post by Williams that questioned the results of the 2020 United States presidential election. Williams said that Woodfin should "be able to take the criticism as a public official" and invited him onto Rightside Radio.

During the 2022 United States Senate election in Alabama, Williams conducted an interview with candidate Michael Durant on Rightside Radio, amid a controversy regarding Durant's views on gun control. When asked about the controversy, Durant's campaign responded to state media inquiries by linking to the interview with Williams. During the interview, Williams asked Durant about past comments on gun control, with Durant claiming these remarks had been taken out of context and defending his position on gun rights.

In July 2022, Rightside Radio expanded its broadcast to the Birmingham area; before then, it was only syndicated in the north Alabama market. Williams previously held brief negotiations to enter the Mobile and Montgomery radio markets, but was then approached by two Birmingham-based stations, Cumulus Media and Crawford Broadcasting. Williams chose to make a deal with Crawford Broadcasting as it was "the better fit there for a variety of reasons." This expansion was accompanied by Williams' renovation of a new studio, located in a space upstairs from his Gadsden office, as well as the addition of live streaming video. As a result of the expansion, Rightside Radio has a broadcast range from Clanton, Alabama, to the state line between Alabama and Tennessee. Williams stated in an interview that his goal for 2023 would be for Rightside Radio to reach the entire state.

== Personal life ==
Williams resides in Rainbow City, Alabama, with his wife Charlene; the couple have two children and two grandchildren.

== Electoral history ==
2014 Alabama Senate, 10th district, general election results
Party	Candidate	Votes	%	±%
Republican	Phil Williams (incumbent)	17,967	52.0%	−1.6%
Democratic	Larry Means	16,530	47.9%	+1.7%
Write-in		45	0.1%	-0.1%
Total votes		34,542	100.0%	
Republican hold				

2010 Alabama Senate, 10th district, general election results
Party	Candidate	Votes	%
Republican	Phil Williams	20,249	53.6%
Democratic	Larry Means (incumbent)	17,459	46.2%
Write-in		51	0.2%
Total votes		37,759	100.0%
Republican gain from Democratic			

2010 Alabama Senate, 10th district, Republican Party primary results
Party	Candidate	Votes	%
Republican	Phil Williams	8,662	82.8%
Republican	Paul Peloquin	1,795	17.2%
Total votes		10,457	100.0%
