= Jesse Battles =

American politician from Alabama

Member of the Alabama Senate from the 10th district
- Incumbent
- Assumed office November 10, 2026
- Preceded by: Andrew Jones

Personal details
- Party: Independent (United States)|Republican]] (Note: Elected as an independent, maintains his Republican identification)
- Spouse: Melissa
- Children: 1

Jesse Battles is a member of the Alabama Senate representing the 10th district since November 10, 2026. A member of the Republican Party, he defeated incumbent Republican senator Andrew Jones in a close general election race on November 3, 2026. Battles had challenged in the Republican primary.

He resides in Ivalee. After the state Republican party voted to remove him from the Republican primary, for reasons Battles states were not given to him, he stood as an independent candidate. He was the only member of the Alabama Legislature elected on an independent ballot line in 2026. He was sworn in a week after the election on November 10. Since Battles defeated Jones by a slim margin, it has triggered an automatic recount.
