= Rudolph Valentino Drake =

American politician

Rudolph Valentino Drake is a member-elect of the Alabama Senate in November 2026. Drake, a Democrat, was elected to represent District 2. He succeeds Tom Butler.

== See also ==
- 2026 Alabama Senate election
