= Larry Means =

American politician

Member of the Alabama Senate from the 10th district
- In office 1998 - 2010
- Preceded by: Roy Smith (R)
- Succeeded by: Phil Williams (R)

Personal details
- Born: April 20, 1947 (age 79) Attalla, Alabama, U.S.
- Party: Democratic
- Spouse: Karen
- Profession: Businessman

Larry P. Means (born April 20, 1947) was a Democratic member of the Alabama Senate, representing the 10th District from 1998 to 2010. Defeated in the 2010 Election, He was again defeated in a rematch in 2014.
