= Alabama's 8th Senate district =

Alabama's 8th State Senate district
Senator
Steve Livingston; R–Scottsboro
- Demographics: 81.3% White; 7.3% Black; 6.2% Hispanic; 0.5% Asian
- Population (2022): 149,611

Alabama's 8th Senate district is one of 35 districts in the Alabama Senate. The district has been represented by Steve Livingston, the Senate Majority Leader, since 2014.

== Geography ==
Election	Map	Counties in District
2026; 2022		Jackson, portions of DeKalb, Madison
2018		Jackson, portions of DeKalb, Madison
2014		Jackson, portions of DeKalb, Madison
2010; 2006; 2002		Jackson, DeKalb, portion of Madison

== Election history ==
=== Elections in the 2020s ===
Alabama Senate election, 2022: Senate District 8
Party	Candidate	Votes	%	±%
Republican	Steve Livingston (Incumbent)	33,758	98.21	−0.12
Write-in		614	1.79	+0.12
Majority		33,144	96.43	−0.22
Turnout		34,372		
Republican hold				

=== Elections in the 2010s ===
Alabama Senate election, 2018: Senate District 8
Party	Candidate	Votes	%	±%
Republican	Steve Livingston (Incumbent)	37,913	98.33	+26.17
Write-in		645	1.67	+1.48
Majority		37,268	96.65	
Turnout		38,558		
Republican hold				

Alabama Senate election, 2014: Senate District 8
Party	Candidate	Votes	%	±%
Republican	Steve Livingston	24,332	72.16	+21.66
Democratic	Horace Clemmons	9,322	27.65	−21.41
Write-in		64	0.19	-0.24
Majority		15,010	44.52	+43.08
Turnout		33,718		
Republican hold				

Alabama Senate election, 2010: Senate District 8
Party	Candidate	Votes	%	±%
Republican	Shadrack McGill	20,603	50.50	+7.15
Democratic	Lowell Barron (Incumbent)	20,016	49.06	−7.44
Write-in		177	0.43	+0.28
Majority		587	1.44	−11.72
Turnout		40,796		
Republican gain from Democratic				

=== Elections in the 2000s ===
Alabama Senate election, 2006: Senate District 8
Party	Candidate	Votes	%	±%
Democratic	Lowell Barron (Incumbent)	19,364	56.50	−1.70
Republican	Don Stout	14,855	43.35	+1.73
Write-in		51	0.15	-0.03
Majority		4,509	13.16	−3.43
Turnout		34,270		
Democratic hold				

Alabama Senate election, 2002: Senate District 8
Party	Candidate	Votes	%	±%
Democratic	Lowell Barron (Incumbent)	19,890	58.20	−3.83
Republican	David Hammonds	14,222	41.62	+3.70
Write-in		61	0.18	+0.13
Majority		5,668	16.59	−7.41
Turnout		34,173		
Democratic hold				

=== Elections in the 1990s ===
Alabama Senate election, 1998: Senate District 8
Party	Candidate	Votes	%	±%
Democratic	Lowell Barron (Incumbent)	19,986	62.03	−37.87
Republican	J. Roger Culpepper	12,220	37.92	+37.92
Write-in		16	0.05	-0.05
Majority		7,766	24.10	−75.70
Turnout		32,222		
Democratic hold				

Alabama Senate election, 1994: Senate District 8
Party	Candidate	Votes	%	±%
Democratic	Lowell Barron (Incumbent)	17,142	99.90	+0.18
Write-in		17	0.10	-0.18
Majority		17,125	99.80	+0.35
Turnout		17,159		
Democratic hold				

Alabama Senate election, 1990: Senate District 8
Party	Candidate	Votes	%	±%
Democratic	Lowell Barron (Incumbent)	20,618	99.72	−0.28
Write-in		57	0.28	+0.28
Majority		20,561	99.45	−0.55
Turnout		20,675		
Democratic hold				

=== Elections in the 1980s ===
Alabama Senate election, 1986: Senate District 8
Party	Candidate	Votes	%	±%
Democratic	Lowell Barron (Incumbent)	17,582	100.00	+44.49
Majority		17,582	100.00	+88.88
Turnout		17,582		
Democratic hold				

Alabama Senate special election, 1983: Senate District 8
Party	Candidate	Votes	%	±%
Democratic	Lowell Barron (Incumbent, Write-In)	7,496	55.51	−44.46
Democratic	J. David Stout	5,994	44.39	+44.39
N/A	Write-in (all others)	14	0.10	+0.07
Majority		1,502	11.12	
Turnout		13,504		
Democratic hold				

This remains the only occasion that a write-in candidate has won election to the Alabama Legislature.

Alabama Senate election, 1982: Senate District 8
Party	Candidate	Votes	%	±%
Democratic	Lowell Barron	19,866	99.97	
Write-in		5	0.03	
Majority		19,861	99.95	
Turnout		19,871		
Democratic hold				

== District officeholders ==
Senators take office at midnight on the day of their election.

- Steve Livingston (2014–present)
- Shadrack McGill (2010–2014)
- Lowell Barron (1982–2010)
- James Lemaster (1978–1982)
- John Baker (1974–1978)
- Richard Malone (1970–1974)
- Ollie W. Nabors (1966–1970)
- Bill Nichols (1962–1966)
- G. Kyser Leonard (1954–1962)
