= Jared Sluss =

American politician

Jared Sluss is a member-elect of the Alabama Senate in November 2026. A Democrat, he defeated Republican incumbent Sam Givhan in Senate District 7. The district is in the area of Huntsville, Alabama. Sluss was 29 years old.

== See also ==
- 2026 Alabama Senate election
