= Alabama's 10th Senate district =

District in Alabama, USA

Alabama's 10th State Senate district
Senator
Jesse Battles; I–Attalla
- Demographics: 78.8% White; 11.1% Black; 6.7% Hispanic; 0.5% Asian
- Population (2022): 150,296

Alabama's 10th Senate district is one of 35 districts in the Alabama Senate. The district has been represented by Jesse Battles since 2026.

== Geography ==
Election	Map	Counties in District
2026; 2022		Cherokee, Etowah, portion of DeKalb
2018		Cherokee, Etowah, portion of DeKalb
2014		Etowah, portions of Cherokee, DeKalb, Madison, St Clair
2010; 2006; 2002		Etowah, portion of Cherokee

== Election history ==
=== Elections in the 2020s ===
Alabama Senate election, 2022: Senate District 10
Party	Candidate	Votes	%	±%
Republican	Andrew Jones (Incumbent)	32,153	98.17	+37.57
Write-in		598	1.83	+1.64
Majority		31,555	96.35	
Turnout		32,751		
Republican hold				

=== Elections in the 2010s ===
Alabama Senate election, 2018: Senate District 10
Party	Candidate	Votes	%	±%
Republican	Andrew Jones	25,902	60.60	+8.59
Independent	Craig Ford	16,759	39.21	+39.21
Write-in		81	0.19	+0.06
Majority		9,143	21.39	+17.23
Turnout		42,742		
Republican hold				

Alabama Senate election, 2014: Senate District 10
Party	Candidate	Votes	%	±%
Republican	Phil Williams (Incumbent)	17,967	52.01	−1.62
Democratic	Larry Means	16,530	47.85	+1.61
Write-in		45	0.13	-0.01
Majority		1,437	4.16	−3.23
Turnout		34,542		
Republican hold				

Alabama Senate election, 2010: Senate District 10
Party	Candidate	Votes	%	±%
Republican	Phil Williams	20,249	53.63	+53.63
Democratic	Larry Means (Incumbent)	17,459	46.24	−51.43
Write-in		51	0.14	-2.19
Majority		2,790	7.39	−87.96
Turnout		37,759		
Republican gain from Democratic				

=== Elections in the 2000s ===
Alabama Senate election, 2006: Senate District 10
Party	Candidate	Votes	%	±%
Democratic	Larry Means (Incumbent)	26,449	97.67	+29.93
Write-in		630	2.33	+2.08
Majority		25,819	95.35	+59.61
Turnout		27,079		
Democratic hold				

Alabama Senate election, 2002: Senate District 10
Party	Candidate	Votes	%	±%
Democratic	Larry Means (Incumbent)	24,702	67.74	+7.48
Republican	David Williams	11,670	32.00	−7.69
Write-in		92	0.25	+0.19
Majority		13,032	35.74	+15.17
Turnout		36,464		
Democratic hold				

=== Elections in the 1990s ===
Alabama Senate election, 1998: Senate District 10
Party	Candidate	Votes	%	±%
Democratic	Larry Means	22,446	60.26	+16.79
Republican	Roy Smith (Incumbent)	14,783	39.69	−16.75
Write-in		21	0.06	-0.03
Majority		7,663	20.57	+5.79
Turnout		37,250		
Democratic gain from Republican				

Alabama Senate election, 1994: Senate District 10
Party	Candidate	Votes	%	±%
Republican	Roy Smith	19,806	56.44	+9.21
Democratic	Jack Floyd (Incumbent)	15,257	43.47	−9.30
Write-in		31	0.09	+0.09
Majority		4,826	14.78	+9.23
Turnout		35,094		
Republican gain from Democratic				

Alabama Senate election, 1990: Senate District 10
Party	Candidate	Votes	%	±%
Democratic	Jack Floyd	17,338	52.77	−47.23
Republican	Charles Boman	15,516	47.23	+47.23
Majority		1,822	5.55	−94.45
Turnout		32,854		
Democratic hold				

=== Elections in the 1980s ===
Alabama Senate election, 1986: Senate District 10
Party	Candidate	Votes	%	±%
Democratic	Bill Drinkard (Incumbent)	22,234	100.00	+25.12
Majority		22,234	100.00	+52.23
Turnout		22,234		
Democratic hold				

Alabama Senate special election, 1983: Senate District 10
Party	Candidate	Votes	%	±%
Democratic	Bill Drinkard	8,156	73.88	−26.12
Republican	Alan C. Loveman	2,883	26.12	+26.12
Majority		5,273	47.77	
Turnout		11,039		
Democratic hold				

Alabama Senate election, 1982: Senate District 10
Party	Candidate	Votes	%	±%
Democratic	Larry Keener (Incumbent)	25,129	100.00	
Majority		25,129	100.00	
Turnout		25,129		
Democratic hold				

== District officeholders ==
Senators take office at midnight on the day of their election.

- Jesse Battles (2026–Present)
- Andrew Jones (2018–2026)
- Phil Williams (2010–2018)
- Larry Means (1998–2010)
- Roy Smith (1994–1998)
- Jack Floyd (1990–1994)
- Bill Drinkard (1983–1990)
- Larry Keener (1978–1983)
- Gerald W. Waldrop (1974–1978)
- James A. Branyon II (1966–1974)
- Ernest C. Hornsby (1962–1966)
- W. Carvel Woodall (1958–1962)
- Broughton Lamberth (1954–1958)
