= Keith Kelley =

American politician

Member of the Alabama Senate from the 12th district
- Incumbent
- Assumed office November 9, 2022
- Preceded by: Del Marsh

Personal details
- Party: Republican

Keith Kelley is an American politician and realtor who currently serves as a member of the Alabama Senate for the 12th district, which comprises all of Calhoun County and eastern Talladega County. Kelly's four-year term began in November 2022. A Republican, he served as president of the Alabama Association of Realtors and on the National Association of Realtors board of directors. Prior to this, Kelley worked for Harris-McKay Realty, a company offering property management services.

In 2026, Kelley sponsored a Ten Commandments bill for public schools. The bill would pass and be signed into law by Governor Kay Ivey.
