= Scott Ortis =

American politician

Member-elect of the Alabama Senate from the 15th district
- Assuming office November 3, 2026
- Succeeding: Dan Roberts

Personal details
- Party: Republican

Scott Ortis is an American politician. A member of the Republican Party, he is the member-elect for the 15th district of the Alabama Senate.
