= Dan Roberts (politician) =

American politician

Member of the Alabama Senate from the 15th district
- Incumbent
- Assumed office November 7, 2018
- Preceded by: Slade Blackwell
- Succeeded by: Scott Ortis (elect)

Personal details
- Party: Republican
- Spouse: Anne Griggs
- Children: 3
- Education: Auburn University (BS); Georgia State University (MS)

Dan Roberts is an American politician and real estate agent serving as a member of the Alabama Senate from the 15th district. He assumed office on November 7, 2018.

== Early life and education ==
Roberts was raised throughout the United States, including in Buffalo, New York; Mobile, Alabama; and Birmingham, Alabama. He earned a Bachelor of Science degree in building construction from Auburn University and a Master of Science degree in real estate and urban affairs from Georgia State University.

== Career ==
After earning his bachelor's degree, Roberts worked for Blount International in South Korea and Saudi Arabia. As a graduate student, he founded an international trading company. He later worked for Jim Wilson and Associates before establishing his own real estate development firm. Roberts worked as the chairman of the board of Leachman Ministries in Virginia and also lived with his family in Belo Horizonte, Brazil after launching Campus Outreach Brazil.

Roberts was elected to the Alabama Senate in November 2018. Since the 2019–2020 legislative session, Roberts has served as vice chair of the Senate Transportation and Energy Committee. He is chair of the Local Legislation Shelby County Committee.

== Personal life ==
He was married to the former Anne Griggs but widowed in March 2022. The couple had three sons and many grandchildren.
