= Randy Price =

American politician

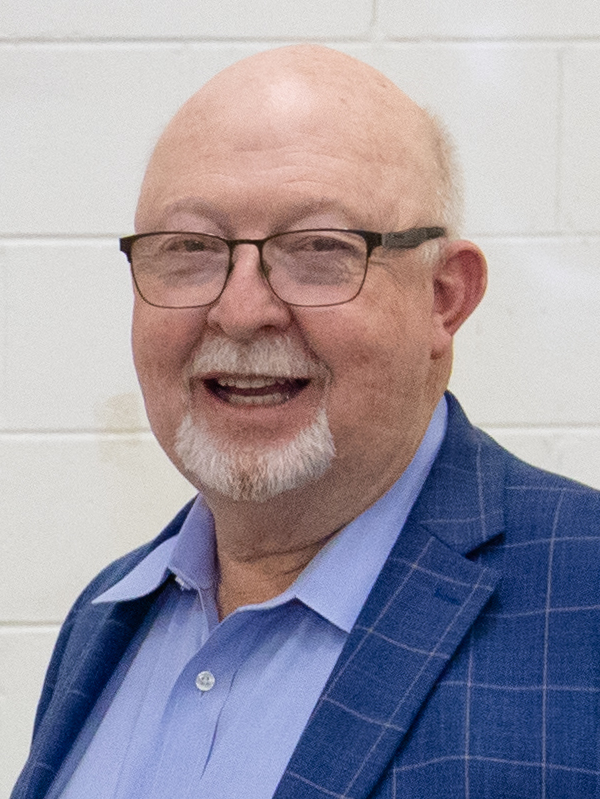
- Price in 2021

Member of the Alabama Senate from the 13th district
- Incumbent
- Assumed office November 7, 2018
- Preceded by: Gerald Dial

Personal details
- Born: 1957 (age 68–69)
- Party: Republican
- Spouse: Oline
- Children: 2
- Education: Troy State University
- Profession: Businessman, farmer

Randy Price (born 1957) is a Republican member of the Alabama Senate, representing the 13th District since 2018. He is a former Lee County, Alabama commissioner and chairman of the Lee County Republican Executive Committee. He also ran unsuccessfully for the Alabama House of Representatives in 2014. Price resides in Opelika, Alabama and is a small business owner and farmer. He is married to Oline, who is the revenue commissioner of Lee County.

On July 12, 2020, it was announced that Price was hospitalized at East Alabama Medical Center due to COVID-19, becoming the first Alabama legislator to be diagnosed with the virus. After a lengthy hospital stay Senator Price was released to go home. He endured a long, difficult recovery. He has since returned to normal work and family life.
