= Shay Shelnutt =

American politician

Member of the Alabama Senate from the 17th district
- Incumbent
- Assumed office November 5, 2014
- Preceded by: Scott Beason

Personal details
- Born: September 21, 1967 (age 58) Birmingham, Alabama
- Party: Republican
- Spouse: Paige
- Website: Senate website

Shay Shelnutt (born September 21, 1967) is an American politician and current member of the Alabama State Senate, representing the 17th District.

== Alabama Senate ==
=== 2014 election ===
On February 3, 2014, Shelnutt announced that he would be running for the District 17 seat in the Alabama State Senate, which would be vacated by Scott Beason.

Shelnutt would go on to win the run-off election for the Republican primary on July 16.

In May 2019, he voted to make abortion a crime at any stage in a pregnancy, with no exemptions for cases of rape or incest.

== Personal ==
Shelnutt competed on an episode of Family Feud that originally aired October 12, 2015.
