= Del Marsh =

American politician

Acting President of the Alabama Senate
- In office April 10, 2017 – January 14, 2019
- Preceded by: Kay Ivey
- Succeeded by: Will Ainsworth

President pro tempore of the Alabama Senate
- In office November 3, 2010 – February 2, 2021
- Preceded by: Rodger Smitherman
- Succeeded by: Greg Reed

Member of the Alabama Senate from the 12th district
- In office November 3, 1998 – November 9, 2022
- Preceded by: Doug Ghee
- Succeeded by: Keith Kelley

Personal details
- Born: September 2, 1956 (age 69) Wheeling, West Virginia, U.S.
- Party: Republican
- Spouse: Ginger Suddeth
- Children: 2
- Education: Auburn University (BA)

Adelbert Carl "Del" Marsh (born September 2, 1956) is a former Republican member of the Alabama Senate, who represented the 12th District from 1998 until 2022. He defeated Democratic challenger Judge Wallace Wyatt in the 2010 midterm elections. The next day, he was chosen as President pro tempore of the Alabama State Senate by his colleagues. Since the succession of Kay Ivey to the position of Governor of Alabama on April 10, 2017, until January 14, 2019, the office of lieutenant governor was vacant.

== Career ==
In May 2019, he voted to make abortion a crime at any stage in a pregnancy, with no exemptions for cases of rape or incest.

In May 2019, he co-sponsored a bill to change Alabama's ethics laws to allow lobbyists to give unlimited gifts to lawmakers. Also on the bill were measures to decriminalize bribery and to redefine key terms of the ethics laws in order to loosen their power to prevent corruption.

In May 2020, during the COVID-19 pandemic, Marsh proposed using $200 million of CARES Act relief for the building of a new state house. $1.8 billion was given to the Alabama state government to be used for expenditures caused by the pandemic.

Alabama Senate
Preceded by Rodger Smitherman	President pro tempore of the Alabama Senate; 2010–2021	Succeeded by Greg Reed
Political offices
Preceded by Kay Ivey	President of the Alabama Senate; Acting; 2017–2019	Succeeded by Will Ainsworth
