= Clyde Chambliss =

American politician

Member of the Alabama Senate from the 30th district
- Incumbent
- Assumed office November 5, 2014
- Preceded by: Bryan Taylor

Personal details
- Born: Clyde Lee Chambliss Jr. April 16, 1969 (age 57) Prattville, Alabama, U.S.
- Party: Republican
- Spouse: Tara Herring
- Education: University of Alabama

Clyde Lee Chambliss Jr. (born April 16, 1969) is an American Republican politician who has served in the Alabama Senate from the 30th district since 2014. He completed his degree in Civil Engineering from the University of Alabama in 1992, after which he started his civil engineering firm.

== Alabama abortion law ==
In May 2019, he sponsored the Human Life Protection Act, which bans all abortions except in the case of endangerment to the mother’s health. Abortions in the cases of rape and incest are banned under the statute, which subjects those who perform abortions to a prison sentence of 10 to 99 years. When asked about the issue, Chambliss said: "When God creates the miracle of life inside a woman’s womb, it is not our place as human beings to extinguish that life."

The legislation only applied to zygotes or fertilized eggs that are inside the womb, not those used in fertility treatments. Chambliss explained the discrepancy, "The egg in the lab doesn’t apply. It’s not in a woman. She’s not pregnant."
