= Steve Livingston =

American politician

Majority Leader of the Alabama Senate
- Incumbent
- Assumed office October 30, 2023
- Preceded by: Clay Scofield

Member of the Alabama Senate from the 8th district
- Incumbent
- Assumed office November 5, 2014
- Preceded by: Shadrack McGill

Personal details
- Education: University of Alabama (BA)

Steve Livingston is an American politician. A member of the Republican Party, he has served in the Alabama Senate, representing the 8th district since 2014. In 2023, his Republican colleagues elected him Majority Leader of the Alabama Senate following the resignation of Clay Scofield.

== Early political activities ==
Senator Livingston was elected to the Alabama State Senate in November, 2014 and reelected in 2018. He was named to GOPAC's Emerging Leaders Class in 2019.

In May 2019, he voted to make abortion a crime at any stage in a pregnancy, with no exemptions for cases of rape or incest.

== Education ==
Livingston is a graduate of Scottsboro High School, and holds a degree from the University of Alabama.

== Personal life ==
Senator Livingston is a small businessman and resident Scottsboro, Alabama. He is a member of First United Methodist Church, and has two children, Laura Ann and Jager.

Alabama Senate
| Preceded by Clay Scofield | Majority Leader of the Alabama Senate; 2023–present | Incumbent |
