= Andrew Jones (American politician) =

American politician

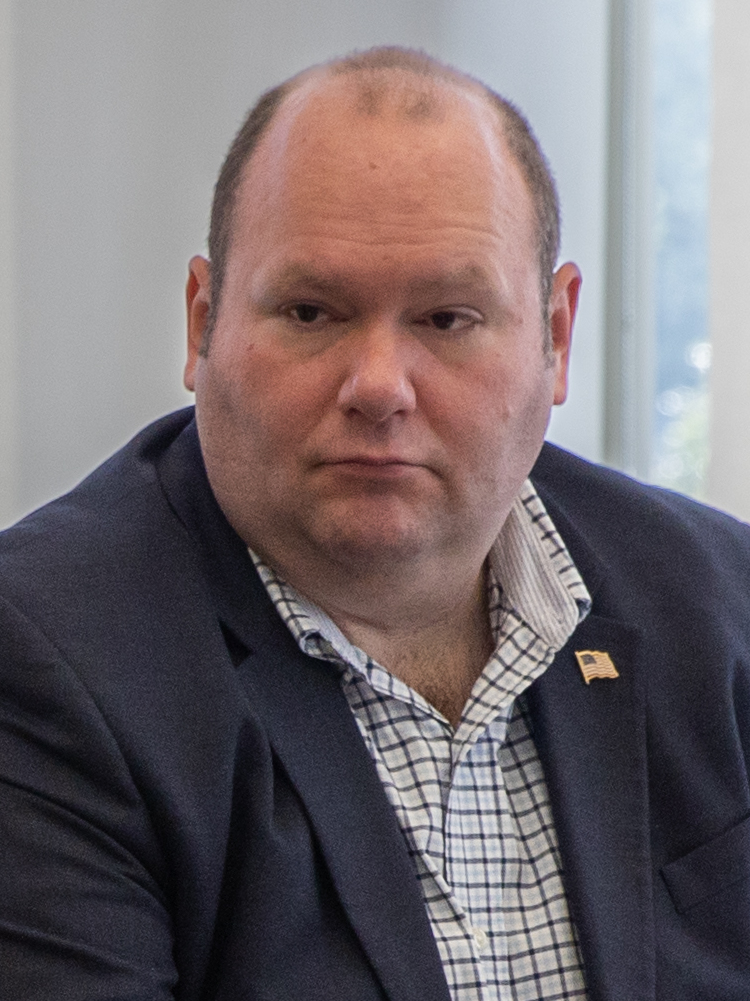

Member of the Alabama Senate from the 10th district
- In office November 7, 2018 – November 10, 2026
- Preceded by: Phil Williams
- Succeeded by: Jesse Battles

Personal details
- Party: Republican
- Spouse: Summer Overstreet Jones (m. 2019)
- Education: Berea College (BA); College of William and Mary (MPP)

Andrew Jones is an American politician. He served as a Republican member of the Alabama Senate for the 10th District from November 7, 2018 until November 10, 2026.
