= Donnie Chesteen =

American politician

Member of the Alabama Senate from the 29th district
- Incumbent
- Assumed office November 7, 2018
- Preceded by: Harri Anne Smith

Member of the Alabama House of Representatives from the 87th district
- In office November 3, 2010 – November 7, 2018
- Preceded by: Warren Beck
- Succeeded by: Jeff Sorrells

Personal details
- Born: August 27, 1953 (age 73)
- Party: Republican
- Spouse: Stephanie Ward
- Children: 2
- Education: Troy State University
- Profession: Businessman, educator

James Donald Chesteen Jr. (born August 27, 1953) is a Republican member of the Alabama Senate, representing the 29th District since November 7, 2018. He previously served in the Alabama House of Representatives representing the 87th district from November 3, 2010, to November 7, 2018. Chesteen is a former high school football coach and educator, as was his father, James Donald "J.D. Chesteen", who is a member of the Alabama High School Athletic Association Sports Hall of Fame.
