= Chris Elliott (politician) =

American politician from Alabama

Member of the Alabama Senate from the 32nd district
- Incumbent
- Assumed office January 8, 2019
- Preceded by: Trip Pittman

Personal details
- Born: Thomas Christopher Elliott; June 18, 1980 (age 46) Mobile, Alabama, U.S.
- Party: Republican
- Education: University of Richmond (BA)

Thomas Christopher "Chris" Elliott (born June 18, 1980) is an American politician and state senator in the Alabama Senate in Senate District 32.

== Early life and education ==
Elliott was born and raised in Mobile and Baldwin County. After graduating from St. Paul's Episcopal School Elliott received his Bachelor of Arts from the University of Richmond in Virginia, majoring in political science and urban policy.

After completing his undergraduate studies, Elliott worked for the Commonwealth of Virginia in the Emergency Management field and for Virginia Power focusing on Nuclear Security and Emergency Preparedness. Later, he returned to Baldwin County in order to raise his family and become a small business owner.

Elliott has been active in Republican party politics for over two decades, and has worked for numerous statewide and local political campaigns in Alabama. Elliott served on the executive committee of the Baldwin County Republican Party, formerly as Vice Chairman for District 2, served on the Steering Committee of the Baldwin County Republican Party, the executive committee of the Alabama Republican Party, is a member and past Chairman of the Baldwin County Young Republicans, and is an associate member of both the Eastern Shore and South Baldwin Republican Women.

== Political career ==
Elliott is a member of the Alabama Senate where he serves as Chairman of the County and Municipal Government Committee and Vice-Chairman of the State Governmental Affairs Committee, he also serves as a member of the Aerospace and Defense Caucus, and the National Conference of State Legislatures.

He formerly served as the Chairman of the Baldwin County Commission and the Chairman of the Eastern Shore Metropolitan Planning Organization, as well as on various national, statewide and countywide boards and committees. While Commissioner, Elliott also served on the Board of Directors of Baldwin County United Way.

In 2015, he was recognized as one of the Mobile Area's Top 40 Under 40 Young Leaders by Mobile Bay Monthly Magazine and, in 2018, he was recognized in the Yellowhammer Power and Influence 50, Who's Next, an annual list of the 50 most powerful and influential players in Alabama politics. He is a graduate of the Alabama Leadership Initiative and a member of the 30th Class of Leadership Alabama. In 2020, Elliott was recognized as an Emerging Legislative Leader by the State Legislative Leaders Foundation and the University of Virginia's Darden School of Business and was named the Alabama Forestry Association's "Legislator of the Year" in 2021

== Key issues and legislation ==
- Infrastructure Funding - Elliott serves on the Senate Transportation Committee, which allocates state transportation funding dollars, and was appointed by the Lt. Governor to serve on the Joint Transportation Committee (JTC) and serves as the Chairman of the JTC's State Transportation Improvement Plan (STIP) subcommittee. The STIP .
- School Funding & Debt Structure - Elliott secured more funding for schools and has successfully shepherded legislation that ensures fast growing school districts receive more funding sooner, approximately $12 million annually, from Alabama's education budget and that those dollars are spent efficiently by passing legislation that protects those dollars without needing to encumber them with debt, a savings of $162 million over 30 years.
- I-10 Toll Bridge - Elliott has long supported the improvement of the I-10 corridor over Mobile Bay but opposed the original toll scheme proposed by Governor Kay Ivey to pay for the project. He was instrumental in the efforts to thwart the Governor's toll plan which drew the Governor's ire. After being declared “dead” by Governor Ivey, Senator Elliott worked to find a reasonable solution that preserves existing free routes, limits tolls and prevents foreign ownership of Alabama’s infrastructure.
- Elliott introduced a bill to strip $5 million in funding from the Alabama Department of Archives and History because it held a single one-hour lecture on LGBTQ history. The bill did not pass.
