= Alabama Senate =

Upper house of the Alabama legislature

Coordinates: 32°22′36″N 86°17′56″W

Alabama State Senate
- Alabama State Legislature

Type
- Type: Upper house
- Term limits: None

History
- New session started: February 4, 2025

Leadership
- President: Will Ainsworth (R) since January 14, 2019
- President pro tempore: Garlan Gudger (R) since February 4, 2025
- Majority Leader: Steve Livingston (R) since October 30, 2023
- Minority Leader: Bobby Singleton (D) since January 8, 2019

Structure
- Seats: 35
- Political groups: Majority: Republican (27); Minority: Democratic (8)
- Length of term: 4 years
- Authority: Article IV, Alabama Constitution
- Salary: $62,212/yr

Elections
- Voting system: First-past-the-post
- Last election: November 8, 2022 (35 seats)
- Next election: November 3, 2026 (35 seats)
- Redistricting: Legislative Control

Meeting place
- State Senate Chamber; Alabama State House; Montgomery, Alabama

Website
- Alabama State Senate

Rules
- Rules of the Alabama State Senate

The Alabama State Senate is the upper house of the Alabama Legislature, the state legislature of the U.S. state of Alabama. The body is composed of 35 members representing an equal number of districts across the state, with each district containing at least 127,140 citizens. Similar to the lower house, the Alabama House of Representatives, the senate serves both without term limits and with a four-year term.

The Alabama State Senate meets at the State House in Montgomery.

Like other upper houses of state and territorial legislatures and the United States Senate, the senate can confirm or reject gubernatorial appointments to the state cabinet, commissions and boards.

== Assembly powers ==
While the House of Representatives has exclusive power to originate revenue bills, such legislation can be amended and/or substituted by the senate. Moreover, because the senate is considered to be the "deliberative body", rules concerning the length of the debate are more liberal than those of the House of Representatives.

Like the United States Senate, the Alabama State Senate has the sole power of Confirmation of certain appointees designated by the Constitution and by statute. The legislative antecedent of this role is a similar power that was vested in the Roman Senate during the Roman Republic.

== Membership guidelines ==
The Alabama State Senate is composed of 35 state senators, in keeping with Article IV, Section 50, of the Alabama Constitution, which limits the Alabama House of Representatives to 105 members, and the senate to 35; together with Article IX, Sections 197 and 198, which requires that membership in the state senate consist of not less than one-fourth, nor more than one-third, of the total membership of the state House of Representatives. Additional representation is authorized in the event of the creation of new counties. Thus, the Alabama State Senate is precisely one-third the size of the House of Representatives, and each state senator represents a district of approximately 125,000 Alabamians.

Under Article IV, Section 47 of the Constitution, Senators must be at least 25 years of age at the time of their election, must be citizens and residents of the state of Alabama for at least 3 years, and reside within their district for at least one year prior to election.

Senators, like members of the House of Representatives, are elected for four-year terms and take office at midnight of the day of their election. Amendment 97 to the Constitution, provides that should a vacancy occur in either house of the Legislature, the governor is required to call a special election to fill the vacancy.

== Composition ==
↓
27	8
Republican	Democratic

Affiliation	Party (Shading indicates majority caucus)		Total	Vacant
Affiliation	Republican	Democratic	Total	Vacant
2019–2022 session	27	8	35	0
Begin 2023 session	27	8	35	0
October 30, 2023 (Note: Clay Scofield (District 9) resigned)	26	8	34	1
January 23, 2024 (Note: Wes Kitchens was sworn in to succeed Scofield)	27	8	35	0
January 1, 2025 (Note: Greg Reed (District 5) resigned)	26	8	34	1
June 27, 2025 (Note: Matt Woods was sworn in to succeed Reed)	27	8	35	0
Latest voting share	77.1%	22.9%		

== Senate leadership ==
Position	Name	Party	District
President	Will Ainsworth	Republican	Statewide
President pro tempore	Garlan Gudger	Republican	4th–Cullman
Secretary of the senate	D. Patrick Harris		

=== Majority leadership ===
Position	Name	Party	District
Senate Majority Leader in Alabama State Senate	Steve Livingston	Republican	8th–Scottsboro
Senate Majority Vice Leader in Alabama State Senate	Clyde Chambliss	Republican	30th–Prattville

=== Minority leadership ===
Position	Name	Party	District
Minority Leader in Alabama State Senate	Bobby Singleton	Democratic	24th–Greensboro
Minority Vice Leader in Alabama State Senate	Rodger Smitherman	Democratic	18th–Birmingham
Minority Democratic Caucus Chair in Alabama State Senate	Linda Coleman-Madison	Democratic	20th–Birmingham

== List of state senators ==
District	Name	Party	Residence	Start	Counties
1	Tim Melson	Republican	Florence	2014	Lauderdale, part of Limestone
2	Rudolph Drake	Democratic	Madison	2026	Parts of Limestone and Madison
3	Arthur Orr	Republican	Decatur	2006	Morgan, parts of Limestone and Madison
4	Garlan Gudger	Republican	Cullman	2018	Cullman, Marion, Winston
5	Matt Woods	Republican	Jasper	2025 (special)	Fayette, Lamar, Walker, parts of Jefferson and Tuscaloosa
6	Larry Stutts	Republican	Tuscumbia	2014	Colbert, Franklin, Lawrence, part of Limestone
7	Jared Sluss	Democratic	Gurley	2026	Part of Madison
8	Steve Livingston	Republican	Scottsboro	2014	Jackson, parts of DeKalb and Madison
9	Wes Kitchens	Republican	Arab	2024 (special)	Marshall, parts of Blount and Madison
10	Jesse Battles	Independent	Attalla	2026	Cherokee, Etowah, part of DeKalb
11	Lance Bell	Republican	Pell City	2022	Parts of Shelby, St. Clair, and Talladega
12	Keith Kelley	Republican	Anniston	2022	Calhoun, part of Talladega
13	Randy Price	Republican	Opelika	2018	Chambers, Clay, Cleburne, Randolph, part of Lee
14	April Weaver	Republican	Alabaster	2021 (special)	Bibb, parts of Chilton and Shelby
15	Scott Ortis	Republican	Birmingham	2026	Parts of Jefferson and Shelby
16	J. T. Waggoner	Republican	Birmingham	1990	Parts of Jefferson and Shelby
17	Shay Shelnutt	Republican	Trussville	2014	Parts of Blount, Jefferson, and St. Clair
18	Rodger Smitherman	Democratic	Birmingham	1994	Part of Jefferson
19	Merika Coleman	Democratic	Birmingham	2022	Part of Jefferson
20	Linda Coleman-Madison	Democratic	Birmingham	2006	Part of Jefferson
21	Gerald Allen	Republican	Tuscaloosa	2010	Pickens, part of Tuscaloosa
22	Terry Waters	Republican	Range	2026	Escambia, Washington, parts of Baldwin and Mobile
23	Robert Stewart	Democratic	Selma	2022	Butler, Clarke, Conecuh, Dallas, Lowndes, Monroe, Perry, Wilcox
24	Bobby Singleton	Democratic	Greensboro	2005	Choctaw, Greene, Hale, Marengo, Sumter, part of Tuscaloosa
25	Will Barfoot	Republican	Montgomery	2018	Crenshaw, parts of Elmore and Montgomery
26	Kirk Hatcher	Democratic	Montgomery	2021 (special)	Part of Montgomery
27	Jay Hovey	Republican	Auburn	2022	Parts of Lee, Russell, and Tallapoosa
28	Billy Beasley	Democratic	Clayton	2010	Barbour, Bullock, Henry, Macon, parts of Houston and Russell
29	Donnie Chesteen	Republican	Geneva	2018	Geneva, parts of Dale and Houston
30	Clyde Chambliss	Republican	Prattville	2014	Autauga, Coosa, parts of Chilton, Elmore, and Tallapoosa
31	Josh Carnley	Republican	Ino	2022	Coffee, Covington, Pike, part of Dale
32	Chris Elliott	Republican	Spanish Fort	2018	Part of Baldwin
33	Vivian Davis Figures	Democratic	Mobile	1997	Parts of Baldwin and Mobile
34	Rusty Glover	Republican	Wilmer	2026	Part of Mobile
35	David Sessions	Republican	Grand Bay	2018	Part of Mobile

== Past composition of the senate ==
Throughout most of the state's history, the Democratic Party controlled the Alabama State Senate from the time of admission to the Union in 1819 with a few brief exceptions. The Whig Party had a majority in the State Senate in 1837 and again from 1850 to 1851. Following the Civil War and the state's readmission to the Union, the chamber had a Republican majority during the Reconstruction period from 1868 to 1874. This was followed by 136 consecutive years of Democratic majorities. Beginning with the 2010 election Republicans captured a substantial majority in the chamber and have held it in the two elections since in 2014 and 2018.

The first African-American to serve in the Alabama State Senate was Benjamin F. Royal, a Republican from Bullock County, who served from 1868 to 1875. The election of 1983 produced the first female senators in Alabama history as Republican Ann Bedsole (1983-1995) and Democrat Frances "Sister" Strong (1983-1986) won office.

== Leadership of the senate ==
The lieutenant governor of Alabama serves as the president of the senate, but only casts a vote if required to break a tie. In their absence, the president pro tempore presides over the senate. The president pro tempore is elected by the full Senate by nominations taken from the floor, followed by a recorded vote. The president pro tempore is the chief leadership position in the senate. The other Senate Majority and Minority leaders are elected by their respective party caucuses.

The president of the senate is the lieutenant governor, which is currently Will Ainsworth. The president pro tempore is Greg Reed. The majority leader is Republican Steve Livingston and the minority leader is Democrat Bobby Singleton.

=== Committees ===
Current committees include:

- Agriculture, Conservation and Forestry
- Banking and Insurance
- Business and Labor
- Children, Youth Affairs, and Human Resources
- Commerce, Transportation, and Utilities
- Confirmations
- Constitution, Campaign Finance, Ethics, and Elections
- Economic Expansion and Trade
- Education
- Energy and Natural Resources
- Finance and Taxation Education
- Finance and Taxation General Fund
- Fiscal Responsibility and Accountability
- Governmental Affairs
- Health
- Industrial Development and Recruitment
- Judiciary
- Local Legislation No. 1
- Local Legislation No. 2
- Local Legislation No. 3
- Rules
- Small Business and Economic Development
- Tourism and Marketing
- Veterans and Military Affairs

== Senate seal ==
The Senate Seal features an open book and torch, accompanied by the Latin phrase Libertas Per Lege, meaning "Liberty Through Law". The official Seal of the Senate was adopted by Senate Resolution, August 19, 1965, and was created by a special committee consisting of then Senators John Tyson (Mobile), Vaughan Hill Robison (Montgomery), Bill Nichols (Talladega), Lieutenant Governor Jim Allen and Secretary of the Senate McDowell Lee.

== See also ==
- Alabama House of Representatives
- List of Alabama state legislatures
- Government of Alabama
- Impeachment in Alabama
