= 2006 Alabama Senate election =

2006 Alabama Senate elections
- November 7, 2006

All 35 seats in the Alabama Senate 18 seats needed for a majority

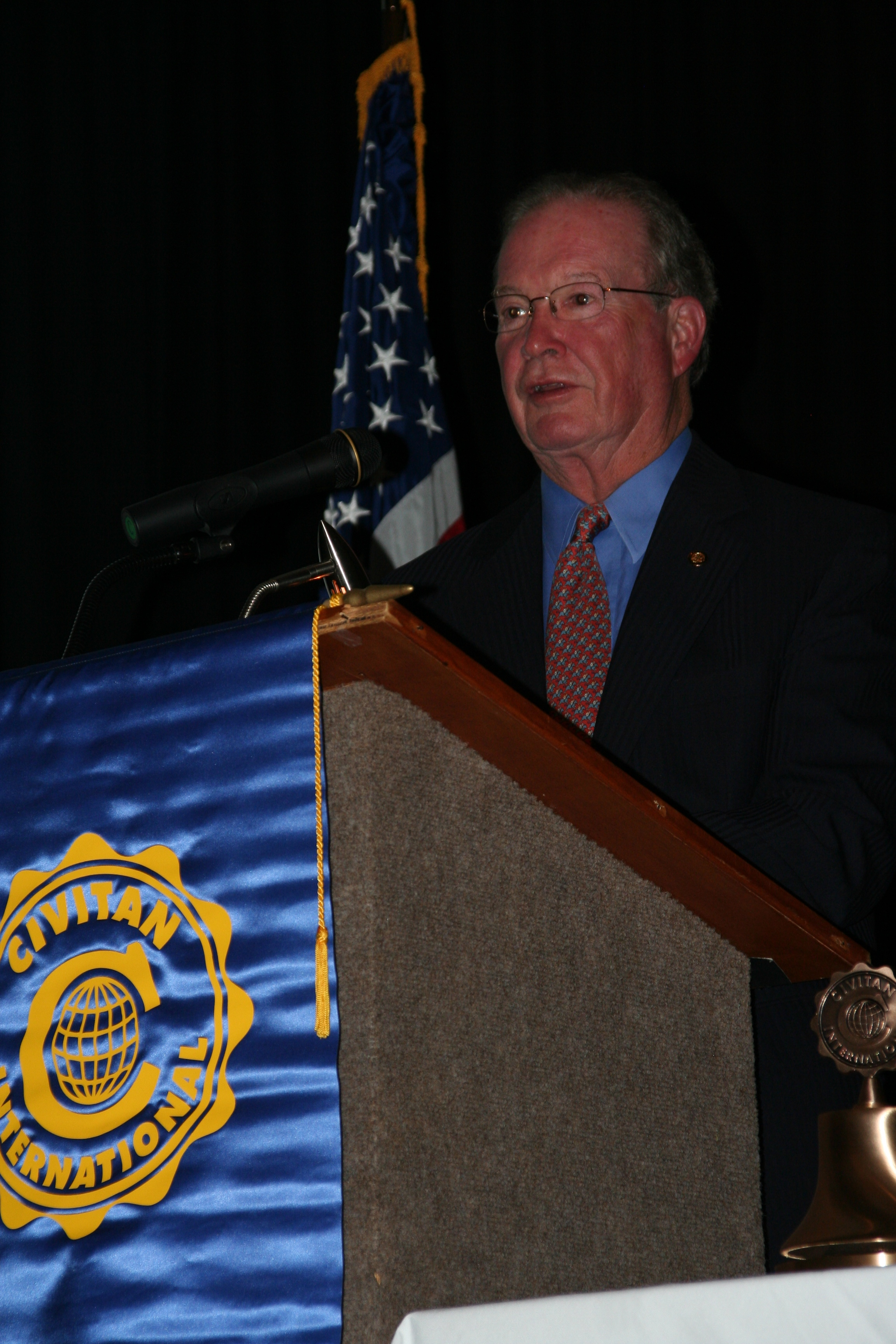
	Majority party	Minority party
Leader	Lowell Barron	J. T. Waggoner
Party	Democratic	Republican
Leader's seat	8th	16th
Seats before	25	10
Seats after	23	12
Seat change	▼2	▲2
Popular vote	585,860	552,797
Percentage	51.2%	48.3%
- Results: Republican gain Republican hold Democratic hold
President pro tempore before election
Lowell Barron
Democratic
Elected President pro tempore
Hinton Mitchem
Democratic

The 2006 Alabama Senate election was held on November 7, 2006. Voters in all 35 districts of the Alabama Senate voted for their senators. The Democratic Party retained their majority in the Senate, losing two seats to the Republican Party. To date, this is the last time that the Democratic Party has won a majority in the Alabama Senate.

== Overview ==
Summary of the November 7, 2006 Alabama Senate election results
District	Incumbent	Party	Elected Senator	Party
1st	Bobby E. Denton	Democratic	Bobby E. Denton	Democratic
2nd	Tom Butler	Democratic	Tom Butler	Democratic
3rd	Tommy Ed Roberts	Democratic	Arthur Orr	Republican
4th	Zeb Little	Democratic	Zeb Little	Democratic
5th	Curt Lee	Republican	Charles Bishop	Republican
6th	Roger Bedford Jr.	Democratic	Roger Bedford Jr.	Democratic
7th	Jeff Enfinger	Democratic	Parker Griffith	Democratic
8th	Lowell Barron	Democratic	Lowell Barron	Democratic
9th	Hinton Mitchem	Democratic	Hinton Mitchem	Democratic
10th	Larry Means	Democratic	Larry Means	Democratic
11th	Jim Preuitt	Democratic	Jim Preuitt	Democratic
12th	Del Marsh	Republican	Del Marsh	Republican
13th	Gerald Dial	Democratic	Kim Benefield	Democratic
14th	Hank Erwin	Republican	Hank Erwin	Republican
15th	Steve French	Republican	Steve French	Republican
16th	J. T. Waggoner	Republican	J. T. Waggoner	Republican
17th	Jack Biddle	Republican	Scott Beason	Republican
18th	Rodger Smitherman	Democratic	Rodger Smitherman	Democratic
19th	Edward McClain	Democratic	Edward McClain	Democratic
20th	Sundra Escott-Russell	Democratic	Linda Coleman-Madison	Democratic
21st	Phil Poole	Democratic	Phil Poole	Democratic
22nd	Pat Lindsey	Democratic	Pat Lindsey	Democratic
23rd	Henry Sanders	Democratic	Henry Sanders	Democratic
24th	Bobby D. Singleton (Note: Singleton won a special election in 2005, following resignation of Charles Steele Jr.)	Democratic	Bobby D. Singleton	Democratic
25th	Larry Dixon	Republican	Larry Dixon	Republican
26th	Quinton Ross	Democratic	Quinton Ross	Democratic
27th	T. D. Little	Democratic	T. D. Little	Democratic
28th	Myron Penn	Democratic	Myron Penn	Democratic
29th	Harri Anne Smith	Republican	Harri Anne Smith	Republican
30th	Wendell Mitchell	Democratic	Wendell Mitchell	Democratic
31st	Jimmy Holley	Democratic	Jimmy Holley	Democratic
32nd	Bradley Byrne	Republican	Bradley Byrne	Republican
33rd	Vivian Davis Figures	Democratic	Vivian Davis Figures	Democratic
34th	Hap Myers	Republican	Rusty Glover	Republican
35th	Gary Tanner	Democratic	Ben Brooks	Republican

== Predictions ==
Source	Ranking	As of
Rothenberg	Likely D	November 4, 2006

== Retirements ==
=== Democrats ===
1. District 3: Tommy Ed Roberts retired.
2. District 7: Jeff Enfinger retired.

=== Republicans ===
1. District 5: Curt Lee retired.
2. District 34: Hap Myers retired.

== Incumbents defeated in primary ==
=== Democrats ===
1. District 13: Gerald Dial lost renomination to Kim Benefield.
2. District 20: Sundra Escott-Russell lost renomination to Linda Coleman-Madison.

=== Republicans ===
1. District 17: Jack Biddle lost renomination to Scott Beason.

== Closest races ==
Seats where the margin of victory was under 10%:

1. District 13, 1.13%
2. District 35, 1.86% (flip)
3. District 9, 6.94%
4. District 22, 8.20%

== Results ==
=== District 1 ===
Alabama Senate election, 2006: Senate District 1
Party	Candidate	Votes	%	±%
Democratic	Bobby E. Denton (incumbent)	23,862	63.76	+0.19
Republican	Buddy Brook	13,531	36.15	−0.08
Write-in		32	0.09	-0.11
Majority		10,331	27.60	+0.26
Turnout		37,425		
Democratic hold				

=== District 2 ===
Alabama Senate election, 2006: Senate District 2
Party	Candidate	Votes	%	±%
Democratic	Tom Butler (incumbent)	24,584	60.39	+2.88
Republican	Jim Burden	16,096	39.54	−2.51
Write-in		30	0.07	-0.37
Majority		8,488	20.85	−5.38
Turnout		40,710		
Democratic hold				

=== District 3 ===
Alabama Senate election, 2006: Senate District 3
Party	Candidate	Votes	%	±%
Republican	Arthur Orr	24,769	62.27	+24.93
Democratic	Bobby Day	14,923	37.52	−25.06
Write-in		85	0.21	+0.13
Majority		9,846	24.75	−0.49
Turnout		39,777		
Republican gain from Democratic				

=== District 4 ===
Alabama Senate election, 2006: Senate District 4
Party	Candidate	Votes	%	±%
Democratic	Zeb Little (incumbent)	23,389	59.86	−1.84
Republican	Harold Sachs	15,648	40.05	+4.00
Write-in		38	0.10	-0.04
Majority		7,741	19.81	−5.84
Turnout		39,075		
Democratic hold				

=== District 5 ===
Alabama Senate election, 2006: Senate District 5
Party	Candidate	Votes	%	±%
Republican	Charles Bishop	20,322	55.23	−2.72
Democratic	Larry Cagle	16,088	43.73	+1.76
Write-in		383	1.04	+0.96
Majority		4,234	11.51	−4.47
Turnout		36,793		
Republican hold				

=== District 6 ===
Alabama Senate election, 2006: Senate District 6
Party	Candidate	Votes	%	±%
Democratic	Roger Bedford Jr. (incumbent)	24,890	97.32	+36.75
Write-in		685	2.68	+2.47
Majority		24,205	94.64	+73.28
Turnout		25,575		
Democratic hold				

=== District 7 ===
Alabama Senate election, 2006: Senate District 7
Party	Candidate	Votes	%	±%
Democratic	Parker Griffith	23,582	65.43	+1.28
Republican	Cheryl Baswell-Guthrie	12,414	34.44	+2.01
Write-in		48	0.13	-0.22
Majority		11,168	30.98	−0.74
Turnout		36,044		
Democratic hold				

=== District 8 ===
Alabama Senate election, 2006: Senate District 8
Party	Candidate	Votes	%	±%
Democratic	Lowell Barron (incumbent)	19,364	56.50	−1.70
Republican	Don Stout	14,855	43.35	+1.73
Write-in		51	0.15	-0.03
Majority		4,509	13.16	−3.43
Turnout		34,270		
Democratic hold				

=== District 9 ===
Alabama Senate election, 2006: Senate District 9
Party	Candidate	Votes	%	±%
Democratic	Hinton Mitchem (incumbent)	21,570	53.40	−5.54
Republican	Bill Ingram	18,766	46.46	+5.75
Write-in		54	0.13	-0.21
Majority		2,804	6.94	−11.29
Turnout		40,390		
Democratic hold				

=== District 10 ===
Alabama Senate election, 2006: Senate District 10
Party	Candidate	Votes	%	±%
Democratic	Larry Means (incumbent)	26,449	97.67	+29.93
Write-in		630	2.33	+2.08
Majority		25,819	95.35	+59.61
Turnout		27,079		
Democratic hold				

=== District 11 ===
Alabama Senate election, 2006: Senate District 11
Party	Candidate	Votes	%	±%
Democratic	Jim Preuitt (incumbent)	19,969	64.32	−2.57
Republican	Jim Hethcox	11,045	35.58	+2.79
Write-in		32	0.10	-0.23
Majority		8,924	28.74	−5.36
Turnout		31,046		
Democratic hold				

=== District 12 ===
Alabama Senate election, 2006: Senate District 12
Party	Candidate	Votes	%	±%
Republican	Del Marsh (incumbent)	26,047	98.21	+39.03
Write-in		476	1.79	+1.45
Majority		25,571	96.41	+77.72
Turnout		26,523		
Republican hold				

=== District 13 ===
Alabama Senate election, 2006: Senate District 13
Party	Candidate	Votes	%	±%
Democratic	Kim Benefield	16,009	50.49	−48.77
Republican	Jim C. Ingram	15,652	49.36	+49.36
Write-in		46	0.15	-0.59
Majority		357	1.13	−97.40
Turnout		31,707		
Democratic hold				

=== District 14 ===
Alabama Senate election, 2006: Senate District 14
Party	Candidate	Votes	%	±%
Republican	Hank Erwin (incumbent)	30,820	97.48	−1.19
Write-in		797	2.52	+1.19
Majority		30,023	94.96	−2.37
Turnout		31,617		
Republican hold				

=== District 15 ===
Alabama Senate election, 2006: Senate District 15
Party	Candidate	Votes	%	±%
Republican	Steve French (incumbent)	35,972	98.74	+10.27
Write-in		458	1.26	+0.90
Majority		35,514	97.49	+20.20
Turnout		36,430		
Republican hold				

=== District 16 ===
Alabama Senate election, 2006: Senate District 16
Party	Candidate	Votes	%	±%
Republican	J. T. Waggoner (incumbent)	34,196	77.66	−20.90
Democratic	Russ Parker	9,789	22.23	+22.23
Write-in		47	0.11	-1.33
Majority		24,407	55.43	−41.69
Turnout		44,032		
Republican hold				

=== District 17 ===
Alabama Senate election, 2006: Senate District 17
Party	Candidate	Votes	%	±%
Republican	Scott Beason	30,446	98.79	+14.87
Write-in		373	1.21	+0.78
Majority		30,073	97.58	
Turnout		30,819		
Republican hold				

=== District 18 ===
Alabama Senate election, 2006: Senate District 18
Party	Candidate	Votes	%	±%
Democratic	Rodger Smitherman (incumbent)	21,212	80.60	−17.95
Republican	Stanley Nance	5,063	19.24	+19.24
Write-in		41	0.16	-1.29
Majority		16,149	61.37	−35.74
Turnout		26,316		
Democratic hold				

=== District 19 ===
Alabama Senate election, 2006: Senate District 19
Party	Candidate	Votes	%	±%
Democratic	Edward McClain (incumbent)	23,600	98.93	+22.14
Write-in		256	1.07	+0.96
Majority		23,344	97.85	+44.17
Turnout		23,856		
Democratic hold				

=== District 20 ===
Alabama Senate election, 2006: Senate District 20
Party	Candidate	Votes	%	±%
Democratic	Linda Coleman-Madison	21,661	79.57	−19.10
Republican	Mel C. Glenn	5,535	20.33	+20.33
Write-in		26	0.10	-1.23
Majority		16,126	59.24	−38.09
Turnout		27,222		
Democratic hold				

=== District 21 ===
Alabama Senate election, 2006: Senate District 21
Party	Candidate	Votes	%	±%
Democratic	Phil Poole (incumbent)	22,017	69.38	+10.61
Republican	Joe Saxton	9,695	30.55	−8.34
Write-in		23	0.07	+0.00
Majority		12,322	38.83	
Turnout		31,735		
Democratic hold				

=== District 22 ===
Alabama Senate election, 2006: Senate District 22
Party	Candidate	Votes	%	±%
Democratic	Pat Lindsey (incumbent)	19,744	54.06	+2.94
Republican	John McMillan	16,748	45.86	−2.81
Write-in		29	0.08	-0.14
Majority		2,996	8.20	+5.75
Turnout		36,521		
Democratic hold				

=== District 23 ===
Alabama Senate election, 2006: Senate District 23
Party	Candidate	Votes	%	±%
Democratic	Henry Sanders (incumbent)	24,142	65.62	−4.91
Republican	Bob Duke	12,626	34.32	+34.32
Write-in		25	0.07	-0.29
Majority		11,516	31.30	−10.11
Turnout		36,793		
Democratic hold				

=== District 24 ===
Alabama Senate election, 2006: Senate District 24
Party	Candidate	Votes	%	±%
Democratic	Bobby Singleton (incumbent)	27,556	98.10	+12.02
Write-in		533	1.90	+1.73
Majority		27,023	96.20	+23.88
Turnout		28,089		
Democratic hold				

=== District 25 ===
Alabama Senate election, 2006: Senate District 25
Party	Candidate	Votes	%	±%
Republican	Larry Dixon (incumbent)	33,197	74.24	−3.37
Democratic	Michael Chappell	11,469	25.65	+6.64
Write-in		52	0.12	-0.09
Majority		21,728	48.59	−10.00
Turnout		44,718		
Republican hold				

=== District 26 ===
Alabama Senate election, 2006: Senate District 26
Party	Candidate	Votes	%	±%
Democratic	Quinton Ross (incumbent)	23,652	99.09	+26.97
Write-in		217	0.91	+0.90
Majority		23,435	98.18	+53.92
Turnout		23,869		
Democratic hold				

=== District 27 ===
Alabama Senate election, 2006: Senate District 27
Party	Candidate	Votes	%	±%
Democratic	T. D. Little (incumbent)	19,656	60.79	−3.27
Republican	Peggy Martin	12,652	39.13	+3.32
Write-in		26	0.08	-0.06
Majority		7,004	21.66	−6.59
Turnout		32,334		
Democratic hold				

=== District 28 ===
Alabama Senate election, 2006: Senate District 28
Party	Candidate	Votes	%	±%
Democratic	Myron Penn (incumbent)	23,413	98.94	+13.49
Write-in		252	1.06	+0.92
Majority		23,161	97.87	+26.82
Turnout		23,665		
Democratic hold				

=== District 29 ===
Alabama Senate election, 2006: Senate District 29
Party	Candidate	Votes	%	±%
Republican	Harri Anne Smith (incumbent)	26,507	75.20	−23.48
Democratic	Ronnie Helms	8,710	24.71	+24.71
Write-in		33	0.09	-1.23
Majority		17,797	50.49	−46.87
Turnout		35,250		
Republican hold				

=== District 30 ===
Alabama Senate election, 2006: Senate District 30
Party	Candidate	Votes	%	±%
Democratic	Wendell Mitchell (incumbent)	22,774	62.00	−36.61
Republican	Joan Reynolds	13,927	37.92	+37.92
Write-in		30	0.08	-1.31
Majority		8,847	24.09	−73.13
Turnout		36,731		
Democratic hold				

=== District 31 ===
Alabama Senate election, 2006: Senate District 31
Party	Candidate	Votes	%	±%
Democratic	Jimmy Holley (incumbent)	19,323	56.30	−8.87
Republican	Dwight L. Adams	14,979	43.64	+9.10
Write-in		19	0.06	-0.23
Majority		4,344	12.66	−17.97
Turnout		34,321		
Democratic hold				

=== District 32 ===
Alabama Senate election, 2006: Senate District 32
Party	Candidate	Votes	%	±%
Republican	Bradley Byrne (incumbent)	32,670	98.90	+8.97
Write-in		364	1.10	+0.45
Majority		32,306	97.80	+17.29
Turnout		33,034		
Republican hold				

=== District 33 ===
Alabama Senate election, 2006: Senate District 33
Party	Candidate	Votes	%	±%
Democratic	Vivian Davis Figures (incumbent)	19,029	71.41	−28.39
Republican	Jeffery Jones	7,594	28.50	+28.50
Write-in		25	0.09	-0.11
Majority		11,435	42.91	−56.69
Turnout		26,648		
Democratic hold				

=== District 34 ===
Alabama Senate election, 2006: Senate District 34
Party	Candidate	Votes	%	±%
Republican	Rusty Glover	27,080	98.75	−1.14
Write-in		343	1.25	+1.14
Majority		26,737	97.50	−2.28
Turnout		27,423		
Republican hold				

=== District 35 ===
Alabama Senate election, 2006: Senate District 35
Party	Candidate	Votes	%	±%
Republican	Ben Brooks	13,945	50.88	+1.86
Democratic	Gary Tanner (incumbent)	13,434	49.02	−1.91
Write-in		26	0.09	+0.04
Majority		511	1.86	−0.05
Turnout		27,405		
Republican gain from Democratic				

== See also ==
- List of Alabama state legislatures
