= Senator Little =

Senator Little may refer to:

- Betty Little (born 1940), New York State Senate
- Brad Little (born 1954), Idaho State Senate
- Clarence B. Little (1857–1941), North Dakota State Senate
- Finis H. Little (died 1880), Mississippi State Senate
- Francis Little (American politician) (1822–1890), Wisconsin State Senate
- Matt Little (born 1984), Minnesota State Senate
- Russell M. Little (1809–1891), New York State Senate
- T. D. Little (born 1942), Alabama State Senate
- Zeb Little (born 1968), Alabama State Senate

== See also ==
- Senator Littell (disambiguation)
