= Senator Poole =

Senator Poole may refer to:

- Phil Poole (born 1959), Alabama State Senate
- Van Poole (born 1935), Florida State Senate

== See also ==
- John Pool (1826–1884), U.S. Senator from North Carolina from 1868 to 1873
