= Will Barfoot =

Alabamian politician

Member of the Alabama Senate from the 25th district
- Incumbent
- Assumed office November 7, 2018
- Preceded by: Dick Brewbaker

Personal details
- Party: Republican
- Spouse: Kathy
- Children: 5
- Education: Auburn University (BA); Jones School of Law (JD)
- Occupation: Attorney

Will Barfoot (born Charles Williamson Barfoot) is an American politician. He is a Republican who represents the 25th district in the Alabama State Senate.

== Biography ==
Barfoot holds a Bachelor of Arts in International Studies from Auburn University, and a Juris Doctor from Jones School of Law. He works as an attorney and was co-founder of Barfoot & Schoettker, a personal injury law firm in Montgomery, Alabama.

== Political career ==
Barfoot served as a temporary probate judge in Montgomery County, Alabama in 2005.

In 2006, Barfoot challenged incumbent Larry Dixon in the Republican primary for nomination for the District 25 seat in the Alabama State Senate. He lost, with 32.60% of the vote to Dixon's 58.43%.

Barfoot was elected to serve as a delegate for Mike Huckabee at the 2008 Republican National Convention.

In 2018, Barfoot ran again for the District 25 seat, this time to replace Dick Brewbaker, who had decided not to seek re-election. He defeated Ronda Walker in the Republican primary with 64.0% of the vote, and defeated David Sadler in the general election with 61.3% of the vote.

Barfoot sits on the following Senate committees:

- Judiciary (Vice Chairperson)
- Confirmations
- Banking and Insurance
- Fiscal Responsibility and Economic Development
- Children Youth and Human Services
- Veterans and Military Affairs

== Electoral history ==
=== 2006 ===
2006 Republican primary election: Alabama State Senate, District 25
Party	Candidate	Votes	%
Republican	Larry Dixon	14,138	58.43%
Republican	Will Barfoot	7,887	32.60%
Republican	Suzelle Josey	2,171	8.97%

=== 2018 ===
2018 Republican primary election: Alabama State Senate, District 25
Party	Candidate	Votes	%
Republican	Will Barfoot	12,801	64.0%
Republican	Ronda Walker	7,185	36.0%

2018 general election: Alabama State Senate, District 25
Party	Candidate	Votes	%
Republican	Will Barfoot	33,029	61.3%
Democratic	David Sadler	20,866	38.7%
	Other/Write-in votes	28	0.1%

=== 2022 ===
2022 general election: Alabama State Senate, District 25
Party	Candidate	Votes	%
Republican	Will Barfoot	32,640	85.3%
Libertarian	Louie Woolbright	5,394	14.1%
	Other/Write-in votes	243	0.6%
