= Senator Brooks (disambiguation) =

C. Wayland Brooks (1897–1957) was a U.S. Senator from Illinois from 1940 to 1949. Senator Brooks may also refer to:

- Ben Brooks (politician) (born 1958), Alabama State Senate
- Benjamin Brooks (politician) (born 1950), Maryland State Senate
- Chris Brooks (politician) (born 1972), Nevada State Senate
- Clifford Cleveland Brooks (1886–1944), Louisiana State Senate
- Corey Brooks (fl. 2010s), Oklahoma State Senate
- Erastus Brooks (1815–1886), New York State Senate
- Francis K. Brooks (born 1943), Vermont State Senate
- George M. Brooks (1824–1893), Massachusetts State Senate
- John Brooks (New York politician) (fl. 2010s), New York State Senate
- Mary Brooks (1907–2002), Idaho State Senate
- Michele Brooks (fl. 2010s), Pennsylvania State Senate
- Patty Pansing Brooks (born 1958), Nebraska State Senate

== See also ==
- Michael Brooks-Jimenez, Oklahoma State Senate
- Senator Brooke (disambiguation)
