= Tom Whatley =

American politician

Member of the Alabama Senate from the 27th district
- In office November 3, 2010 – November 8, 2022
- Preceded by: T. D. Little
- Succeeded by: Jay Hovey

Personal details
- Born: Thomas McKee Whatley; August 7, 1970 (age 56) Opelika, Alabama, U.S.
- Party: Republican
- Spouse: Lauren Kathryn Cross-Whatley (m. 2020)
- Education: Auburn University; Thomas Goode Jones School of Law
- Occupation: Attorney

Thomas McKee Whatley (born August 7, 1970) is an American politician. He is a Republican who represented district 27 in the Alabama State Senate from 2010 to 2022.

== Political career ==
In 2010, Whatley defeated Democratic incumbent T. D. Little to win the 27th district's seat in the Alabama State Senate. He was re-elected in 2014 and 2018.

In 2022, Whatley faced Auburn City Councilman, Jay Hovey, in the Primary Election, in May, on the Republican Ballot. On election night, Whatley trailed Hovey by four votes. After the provisional votes were counted, Hovey had won the election by one vote, making him the Republican nominee for Alabama Senate District 27. The results of this election would be questioned by Whatley, who decided to take it to the ALGOP for further examination. This ALGOP intervention would result in weeks of deliberation and a change in the Primary Election result; however, as of July 1, 2022, the ALGOP vacated its earlier decision of counting an illegal vote from, Mrs. Kenney as a tie, resulting in Councilman Hovey as the official Republican nominee for Alabama Senate District 27.

=== Electoral record ===
2010 general election: Alabama State Senate, District 27
Party	Candidate	Votes	%
Republican	Tom Whatley	21,245	55.0%
Democratic	T. D. Little	17,379	45.0%

2014 Republican primary: Alabama State Senate, District 27
Party	Candidate	Votes	%
Republican	Tom Whatley	7,950	53.1%
Republican	Andy Carter	7,010	46.9%

2014 general election: Alabama State Senate, District 27
Party	Candidate	Votes	%
Republican	Tom Whatley	19,808	65.5%
Democratic	Haylee Moss	10,358	34.3%
	Write-in	56	0.2%

In 2018, Whatley was unopposed in the Republican primary for the 27th district seat.

2018 general election: Alabama State Senate, District 27
Party	Candidate	Votes	%
Republican	Tom Whatley	29,741	59.0%
Democratic	Nancy Carlton Bendinger	20,587	40.9%
	Write-in	50	0.1%

2022 primary election: Alabama State Senate, District 27
Party	Candidate	Votes	%
Republican	Jay Hovey	8,373	50.00%
Republican	Tom Whatley	8,372	50.00%
