= Euclid Rains =

American politician (1920–2000)

Member of the Alabama House of Representatives from the 26th district
- In office 1978–1990
- Preceded by: Hinton Mitchem

Personal details
- Born: Thomas Euclid Rains; November 24, 1920 DeKalb County, Alabama, U.S.
- Died: August 27, 2000 (aged 79) Geraldine, Alabama, U.S.
- Party: Democratic
- Spouse: Nell Rains
- Education: Jacksonville State University

Thomas Euclid Rains (November 24, 1920 – August 27, 2000) was an American politician. He served as a Democratic member for the 26th district of the Alabama House of Representatives.

Rain was born in DeKalb County, Alabama, the son of Annie Ruth Slate and Thomas Rains. At the age of five, Rains became blind after an accident that involved scissors, causing damage to his left eye. He was diagnosed with sympathetic ophthalmia in the right eye at the age of seven.

Rains attended at the Alabama Institute for the Deaf and Blind, from which he graduated in 1941. He then attended Jacksonville State University, graduating in 1944. Rains's decision to attend the university came after his mother read newspaper articles to him.

After college, Rains started a manufacturing business.

In 1978, Rains was elected to represent the 26th district in the Alabama House of Representatives, succeeding Hinton Mitchem. In 1990, Rains decided not to run for re-election.

Rains wrote a memoir about his young years titled I'm Not Afraid of the Dark.

Rains died in August 2000 of a single-vehicle collision next to his home in Geraldine, Alabama, along with his wife, Nell. He was 79 at the time.
