= Slade Blackwell =

American politician

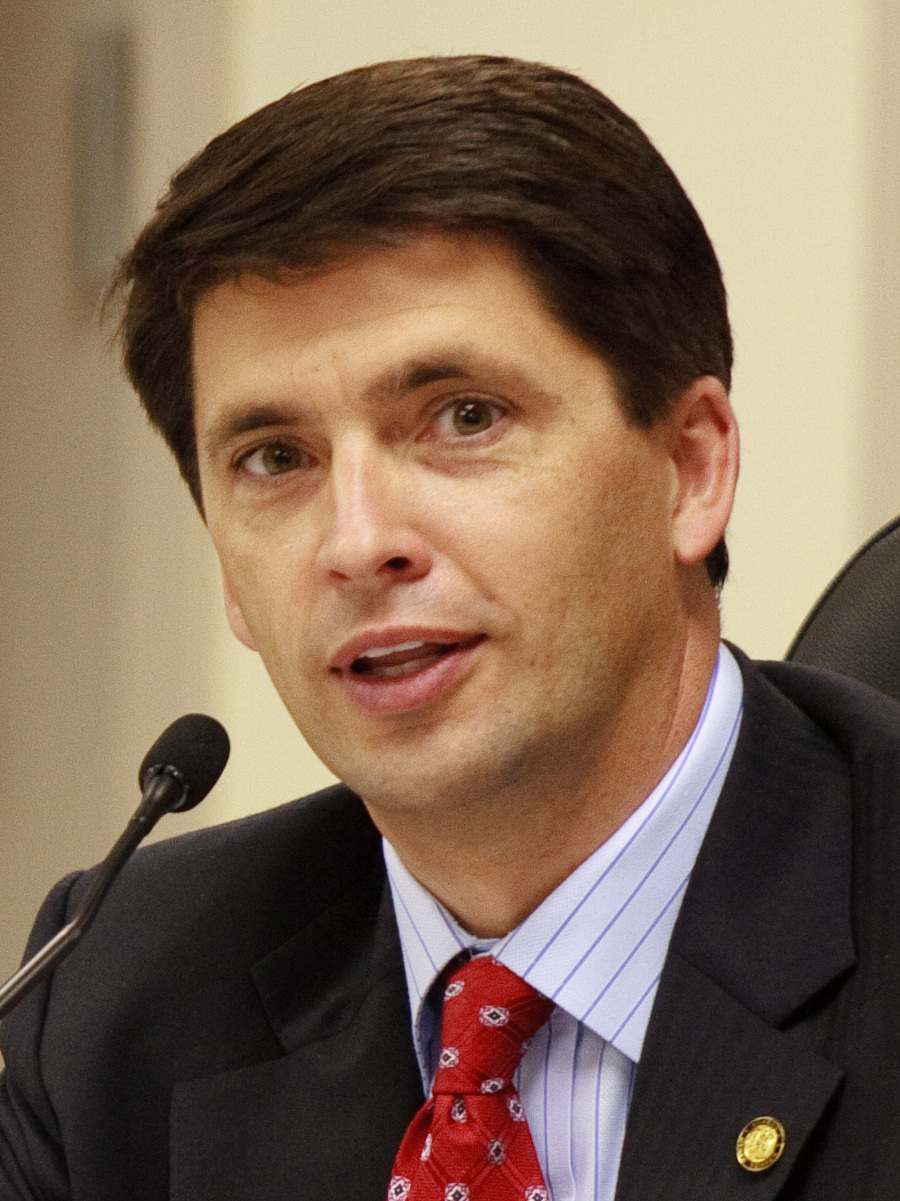
- Blackwell at a public hearing in 2012

Member of the Alabama Senate from the 15th district
- In office November 3, 2010 – November 7, 2018
- Preceded by: Steve French
- Succeeded by: Dan Roberts

Personal details
- Born: June 14, 1968 (age 58) Mississippi, U.S.
- Party: Republican
- Education: University of Montevallo (BS)

Slade Blackwell (born June 14, 1968) is an American Republican politician and businessman who served as a member of the Alabama Senate from 2010 to 2018, representing the 15th district. He was first elected in 2010 and was re-elected in 2014.

== Early life and education ==
He was born in Mississippi and grew up in Montevallo, Alabama. He received a Bachelor of Science in Commercial Design and Business from the University of Montevallo on a basketball scholarship.

== Career ==
After graduating from college, Blackwell worked in commercial real estate, including Colonial Properties Trust, a Birmingham-based real estate development company based in Alabama. In 1996, he founded Inkana Development, a commercial real estate development company based in Alabama.

Blackwell is a member of the Birmingham Business Alliance, Mountain Brook and Greater Shelby County Chambers of Commerce, the Alabama Republican Party, and a board member of Birmingham Golf Association.

Blackwell attended Enon Baptist Church in Calera, Alabama as a child. He now attends Covenant Presbyterian Church in Homewood, Alabama.He is married to Sally Salter, whom he met in high school. They have three children..
