= Alabama's 21st Senate district =

Alabama's 21st State Senate district
Senator
Gerald Allen; R–Cottondale
- Demographics: 67.1% White; 24.0% Black; 5.0% Hispanic; 1.7% Asian
- Population (2022): 145,432

Alabama's 21st Senate district is one of 35 districts in the Alabama Senate. The district has been represented by Gerald Allen since 2010.

== Geography ==
Election	Map	Counties in District
2026; 2022		Pickens, portion of Tuscaloosa
2018		Lamar, portions of Pickens, Tuscaloosa
2014		Lamar, portions of Pickens, Tuscaloosa
2010; 2006; 2002		Pickens, portions of Hale, Tuscaloosa

== Election history ==
=== Elections in the 2020s ===
Alabama Senate election, 2022: Senate District 21
Party	Candidate	Votes	%	±%
Republican	Gerald Allen (Incumbent)	21,962	65.97	−1.54
Democratic	Lisa Ward	11,198	33.64	+1.26
Write-in		132	0.40	+0.29
Majority		10,764	32.33	−2.80
Turnout		33,292		
Republican hold				

=== Elections in the 2010s ===
Alabama Senate election, 2018: Senate District 21
Party	Candidate	Votes	%	±%
Republican	Gerald Allen (Incumbent)	33,368	67.51	+5.21
Democratic	Rick Burnham	16,005	32.38	−5.17
Write-in		52	0.11	-0.04
Majority		17,363	35.13	+10.37
Turnout		49,425		
Republican hold				

Alabama Senate election, 2014: Senate District 21
Party	Candidate	Votes	%	±%
Republican	Gerald Allen (Incumbent)	20,179	62.30	+11.10
Democratic	Phil Poole	12,161	37.55	−11.11
Write-in		48	0.15	+0.01
Majority		8,018	24.76	+22.22
Turnout		32,388		
Republican hold				

Alabama Senate election, 2010: Senate District 21
Party	Candidate	Votes	%	±%
Republican	Gerald Allen	20,528	51.20	+20.65
Democratic	Phil Poole (Incumbent)	19,509	48.66	−20.72
Write-in		55	0.14	+0.07
Majority		1,019	2.54	−36.29
Turnout		40,092		
Republican gain from Democratic				

=== Elections in the 2000s ===
Alabama Senate election, 2006: Senate District 21
Party	Candidate	Votes	%	±%
Democratic	Phil Poole (Incumbent)	22,017	69.38	+10.61
Republican	Joe Saxton	9,695	30.55	−8.34
Write-in		23	0.07	+0.00
Majority		12,322	38.83	
Turnout		31,735		
Democratic hold				

Alabama Senate election, 2002: Senate District 21
Party	Candidate	Votes	%	±%
Democratic	Phil Poole (Incumbent)	19,914	58.77	+8.73
Republican	Jerry Tingle	13,179	38.89	−11.01
Libertarian	Jean Allen	769	2.27	+2.27
Write-in		23	0.07	+0.01
Majority		6,735	19.88	+19.74
Turnout		33,885		
Democratic hold				

=== Elections in the 1990s ===
Alabama Senate election, 1998: Senate District 21
Party	Candidate	Votes	%	±%
Democratic	Phil Poole (Incumbent)	20,049	50.04	−48.40
Republican	Robert J. Bentley	19,991	49.90	+49.90
Write-in		25	0.06	-1.50
Majority		58	0.14	−96.75
Turnout		40,065		
Democratic hold				

Alabama Senate election, 1994: Senate District 21
Party	Candidate	Votes	%	±%
Democratic	Phil Poole	25,548	98.44	−1.56
Write-in		404	1.56	+1.56
Majority		25,144	96.89	−3.11
Turnout		25,952		
Democratic hold				

Alabama Senate election, 1990: Senate District 21
Party	Candidate	Votes	%	±%
Democratic	Ryan deGraffenried (Incumbent)	24,445	100.00	
Majority		24,445	100.00	
Turnout		24,445		
Democratic hold				

=== Elections in the 1980s ===
Alabama Senate election, 1986: Senate District 21
Party	Candidate	Votes	%	±%
Democratic	Ryan deGraffenried (Incumbent)	23,101	100.00	
Majority		23,101	100.00	
Turnout		23,101		
Democratic hold				

Alabama Senate election, 1983: Senate District 21
Party	Candidate	Votes	%	±%
Democratic	Ryan deGraffenried (Incumbent)	7,164	100.00	
Majority		7,164	100.00	
Turnout		7,164		
Democratic hold				

Alabama Senate election, 1982: Senate District 21
Party	Candidate	Votes	%	±%
Democratic	T. D. Little	18,270	100.00	
Majority		18,270	100.00	
Turnout		18,270		
Democratic hold				

=== Earlier elections ===
Following Reynolds v. Sims in 1964, which ruled that electoral districts of state legislatures must be roughly equal in population, the Alabama Senate was reapportioned to elect 35 Senators from 26 districts. District 21 became a multi-member district, comprising Montgomery County and electing 2 Senators in 2 different contests. Following a further court case in 1972, the district, along with all others in the Alabama Senate, was reapportioned to a single-member district for the 1974 election.

== District officeholders ==
Senators take office at midnight on the day of their election.

- Gerald Allen (2010–present)
- Phil Poole (1994–2010)
- Ryan deGraffenried (1983–1994)
- T. D. Little (1974–1983)

As a multi-member district:

- 1966:
  - J. J. Pierce
  - O. J. Goodwyn
- 1970:
  - J. J. Pierce
  - Tom Jones

- L. W. Brannan Jr. (1962–1966)
- Douglas Webb (1958–1962)
- Ralph L. Jones (1954–1958)
