= Alabama's 27th Senate district =

Alabama's 27th State Senate district
Senator
Jay Hovey; R–Auburn
- Demographics: 67.6% White; 22.0% Black; 3.1% Hispanic; 4.5% Asian
- Population (2022): 146,609

Alabama's 27th Senate district is one of 35 districts in the Alabama Senate. The district has been represented by Jay Hovey since 2022.

== Geography ==
Election	Map	Counties in District
2026; 2022		Portions of Lee, Russell, Tallapoosa
2018		Portions of Lee, Russell, Tallapoosa
2014		Portions of Lee, Russell, Tallapoosa
2010; 2006; 2002		Tallapoosa, portions of Lee, Russell,

== Election history ==
=== Elections in the 2020s ===
Alabama Senate election, 2022: Senate District 27
Party	Candidate	Votes	%	±%
Republican	Jay Hovey	26,014	70.17	+11.13
Democratic	Sherri Reese	10,996	29.66	−11.21
Write-in		63	0.17	+0.07
Majority		15,018	40.51	+22.34
Turnout		37,073		
Republican hold				

=== Elections in the 2010s ===
Alabama Senate election, 2018: Senate District 27
Party	Candidate	Votes	%	±%
Republican	Tom Whatley (Incumbent)	29,741	59.04	−6.50
Democratic	Nancy Bendinger	20,587	40.87	+6.60
Write-in		50	0.10	-0.09
Majority		9,154	18.17	−3.10
Turnout		50,378		
Republican hold				

Alabama Senate election, 2014: Senate District 27
Party	Candidate	Votes	%	±%
Republican	Tom Whatley (Incumbent)	19,808	65.54	+10.64
Democratic	Haylee Moss	10,358	34.27	−10.64
Write-in		56	0.19	-0.01
Majority		9,450	21.27	+11.28
Turnout		30,222		
Republican hold				

Alabama Senate election, 2010: Senate District 27
Party	Candidate	Votes	%	±%
Republican	Tom Whatley	21,245	54.90	+15.77
Democratic	T. D. Little (Incumbent)	17,379	44.91	−15.88
Write-in		77	0.20	+0.12
Majority		3,866	9.99	−11.67
Turnout		38,701		
Republican gain from Democratic				

=== Elections in the 2000s ===
Alabama Senate election, 2006: Senate District 27
Party	Candidate	Votes	%	±%
Democratic	T. D. Little (Incumbent)	19,656	60.79	−3.27
Republican	Peggy Martin	12,652	39.13	+3.32
Write-in		26	0.08	-0.06
Majority		7,004	21.66	−6.59
Turnout		32,334		
Democratic hold				

Alabama Senate election, 2002: Senate District 27
Party	Candidate	Votes	%	±%
Democratic	T. D. Little (Incumbent)	23,155	64.06	+0.30
Republican	Keith Ward	12,943	35.81	−0.37
Write-in		50	0.14	+0.08
Majority		10,212	28.25	+0.67
Turnout		36,148		
Democratic hold				

=== Elections in the 1990s ===
Alabama Senate election, 1998: Senate District 27
Party	Candidate	Votes	%	±%
Democratic	T. D. Little (Incumbent)	24,332	63.76	−0.71
Republican	Jerry Teel	13,807	36.18	+0.75
Write-in		21	0.06	-0.04
Majority		10,525	27.58	−1.45
Turnout		38,160		
Democratic hold				

Alabama Senate election, 1994: Senate District 27
Party	Candidate	Votes	%	±%
Democratic	T. D. Little (Incumbent)	19,908	64.47	−9.39
Republican	T. Ponder	10,942	35.43	+9.29
Write-in		31	0.10	+0.10
Majority		8,966	29.03	−18.69
Turnout		30,881		
Democratic hold				

Alabama Senate election, 1990: Senate District 27
Party	Candidate	Votes	%	±%
Democratic	T. D. Little	23,332	73.86	−26.14
Republican	Marell McNeal	8,258	26.14	+26.14
Majority		15,074	47.72	−52.28
Turnout		31,590		
Democratic hold				

=== Elections in the 1980s ===
Alabama Senate election, 1986: Senate District 27
Party	Candidate	Votes	%	±%
Democratic	John Rice	16,345	100.00	+0.20
Majority		16,345	100.00	+0.40
Turnout		16,345		
Democratic hold				

Rice joined the Republican Party in 1988.

Alabama Senate election, 1983: Senate District 27
Party	Candidate	Votes	%	±%
Democratic	T. D. Little	3,431	99.80	−0.18
Write-in		7	0.20	+0.18
Majority		3,424	99.60	−0.37
Turnout		3,438		
Democratic hold				

Alabama Senate election, 1982: Senate District 27
Party	Candidate	Votes	%	±%
Democratic	Larry Dixon	23,305	99.98	
Write-in		4	0.02	
Majority		23,301	99.97	
Turnout		23,309		
Democratic hold				

Dixon joined the Republican Party in 1983.

== District officeholders ==
Senators take office at midnight on the day of their election.

- Jay Hovey (2022–present)
- Tom Whatley (2010–2022)
- T. D. Little (1990–2010)
- John Rice (1986–1990)
- T. D. Little (1983–1986)
- Larry Dixon (1982–1983)
- Bishop N. Barron (1978–1982)
- Fred R. Jones (1974–1978)

Not in use 1966–1974.

- Joseph W. Smith (1962–1966)
- Yetta G. Samford Jr (1958–1962)
- Joseph W. Smith (1954–1958)
