= Gerald Dial =

American politician

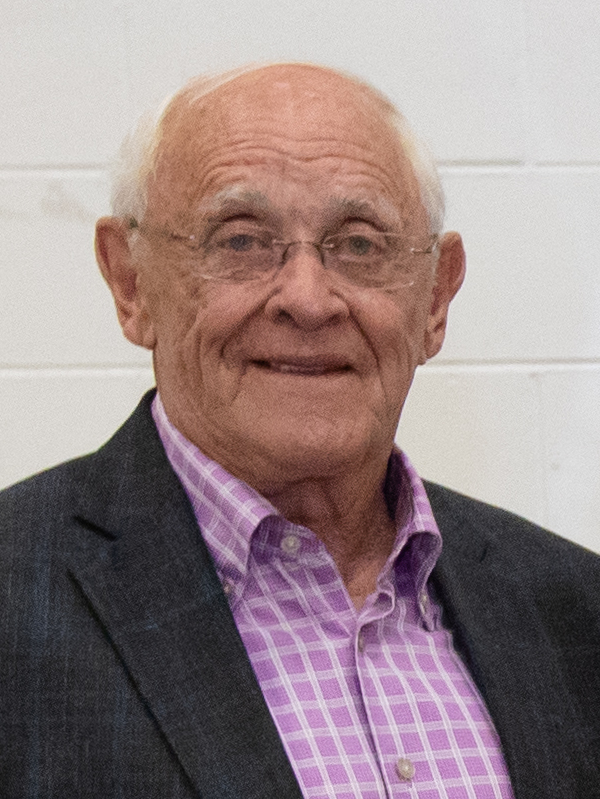
- Dial in 2021

Member of the Alabama Senate from the 13th district
- In office November 3, 2010 – November 7, 2018
- Preceded by: Kim Benefield
- Succeeded by: Randy Price
- In office November 9, 1983 – November 8, 2006
- Preceded by: J. Richmond Pearson
- Succeeded by: Kim Benefield

Member of the Alabama House of Representatives from the 60th district
- In office November 6, 1974 – November 3, 1982
- Preceded by: District created
- Succeeded by: John Casey

Personal details
- Born: November 17, 1937 (age 88) Delta, Alabama
- Party: Republican (2010-present)
- Other political affiliations: Democratic (before 2010)

Gerald Dial (born November 17, 1937) is an American politician who served in the Alabama Senate from the 13th district from 2010 to 2018. He previously served in the Alabama House of Representatives from 1974 to 1982 and in the Alabama Senate from 1983 to 2006.
