= Senator Brooke =

Senator Brooke may refer to:

- Basil Brooke, 1st Viscount Brookeborough (1888–1973), Northern Irish Senator from 1921 to 1922
- Edward Brooke (1919–2015), U.S. Senator from Massachusetts from 1967 to 1979
- Francis T. Brooke (1763–1851), Virginia State Senate
- Walker Brooke (1813–1869), U.S. Senator from Mississippi from 1852 to 1853

== See also ==
- Senator Brooks (disambiguation)
