= Confederate Soldiers and Sailors Monument (Birmingham, Alabama) =

Monument to the Confederacy in Birmingham, Alabama

- United States
- For Confederate Soldiers and Sailors
- Established: 1905
- Removed: June 2, 2020
- Location: 33.52007°N 86.80948°W; Linn Park, Birmingham, Alabama

The Confederate Soldiers and Sailors Monument was a commemorative obelisk that was erected in Linn Park, Birmingham, Alabama in 1905. The monument was dismantled and removed in 2020.

== History ==
The cornerstone of the Monument plinth was laid during the 1894 Reunion of United Confederate Veterans on Confederate Decoration Day, April 26. and contained a Bible and Confederate flag. The slab of rock was unused for several years, though a surplus artillery piece from the Spanish–American War of 1898 once rested on it. On May 29, 1896, The United Daughters of the Confederacy held a meeting to decide what to do with the plinth and, in 1900, raised money for construction of the obelisk. The 52-foot-tall (16 m) monument was completed on April 27, 1905.

In 2017, following widespread concern about the monument being a symbol of historic racism, the Birmingham city council erected a barrier surrounding the memorial, resulting in a lawsuit being brought against it by the state. In January 2019, an Alabama court declared unconstitutional the Alabama Memorial Preservation Act that prohibited "alteration" of the monument. The lower court's decision was reversed in November 2019 by the state Supreme Court, which upheld a fine of $25,000 against the city council.

Following protests in 2020 after the murder of George Floyd, during which protestors damaged and tried to remove the monument, the city council removed the obelisk, leaving only the plinth. The state Attorney General responded by filing a new lawsuit against the city council saying the removal was in violation of the Alabama Memorial Preservation Act of 2017, a law passed specifically to prevent the removal of this monument. It was the most prominent Confederate monument in the state. The Alabama Attorney General filed suit against the city of Birmingham for violating the statute. Mayor Randall Woodfin said the expected $25,000 fine for removing the statue would be much more affordable than the cost of continued unrest in the city.

== See also ==
- List of monuments and memorials removed during the George Floyd protests
- Statue of Charles Linn, removed around the same time
- Statue of Frank Rizzo, removed around the same time
