= Senator Littell =

Senator Littell may refer to:

- Alfred B. Littell (1893–1970), New Jersey State Senate
- Robert E. Littell (1936–2014), New Jersey State Senate

== See also ==
- Senator Little (disambiguation)
