= Wes Kitchens =

American politician

Member of the Alabama Senate from the 9th district
- Incumbent
- Assumed office January 23, 2024
- Preceded by: Clay Scofield

Member of the Alabama House of Representatives from the 27th district
- In office November 7, 2018 – January 23, 2024
- Preceded by: Will Ainsworth
- Succeeded by: Jeana Ross

Personal details
- Born: Wesley Thomas Kitchens; March 4, 1989 (age 37) Arab, Alabama, U.S.
- Party: Republican
- Education: Auburn University
- Occupation: Insurance Agent

Wesley Thomas Kitchens is an American politician who serves in the Alabama Senate, representing the 9th district since 2024. He previously served in the Alabama House of Representatives, representing the 27th district. He is a member of the Republican Party.

In January 2024 Kitchens won the Republican primary for a special election to succeed former state senator Clay Scofield. Since there was no Democratic opposition he was declared the winner without a general election.
