= Alabama's 25th Senate district =

Alabama's 25th State Senate district
Senator
Will Barfoot; R–Pike Road
- Demographics: 61.6% White; 29.4% Black; 2.3% Hispanic; 4.3% Asian
- Population (2022): 147,978

Alabama's 25th Senate district is one of 35 districts in the Alabama Senate. The district has been represented by Will Barfoot since 2018.

== Geography ==
Election	Map	Counties in District
2026; 2022		Crenshaw, Elmore, portion of Montgomery
2018		Crenshaw, portions of Elmore, Montgomery
2014		Crenshaw, portions of Elmore, Montgomery
2010; 2006; 2002		Portions of Elmore, Montgomery

== Election history ==
=== Elections in the 2020s ===
Alabama Senate election, 2022: Senate District 25
Party	Candidate	Votes	%	±%
Republican	Will Barfoot (Incumbent)	32,640	85.27	+24.02
Libertarian	Louie Woolbright	5,394	14.09	+14.09
Write-in		243	0.64	+0.59
Majority		27,246	71.18	+48.62
Turnout		38,277		
Republican hold				

Alabama Senate election, 2018: Senate District 25
Party	Candidate	Votes	%	±%
Republican	Will Barfoot	33,029	61.25	−36.92
Democratic	David A. Sadler	20,866	38.70	+38.70
Write-in		28	0.05	-1.78
Majority		12,163	22.56	−73.78
Turnout		53,923		
Republican hold				

Alabama Senate election, 2014: Senate District 25
Party	Candidate	Votes	%	±%
Republican	Dick Brewbaker (Incumbent)	29,545	98.17	+25.28
Write-in		551	1.83	+1.74
Majority		28,994	96.34	+50.47
Turnout		30,096		
Republican hold				

Alabama Senate election, 2010: Senate District 25
Party	Candidate	Votes	%	±%
Republican	Dick Brewbaker	38,919	72.89	−1.35
Democratic	Doug Smith	14,425	27.02	+1.37
Write-in		50	0.09	-0.03
Majority		24,494	45.87	−2.72
Turnout		53,394		
Republican hold				

=== Elections in the 2000s ===
Alabama Senate election, 2006: Senate District 25
Party	Candidate	Votes	%	±%
Republican	Larry Dixon (Incumbent)	33,197	74.24	−3.37
Democratic	Michael Chappell	11,469	25.65	+6.64
Write-in		52	0.12	-0.09
Majority		21,728	48.59	−10.00
Turnout		44,718		
Republican hold				

Alabama Senate election, 2002: Senate District 25
Party	Candidate	Votes	%	±%
Republican	Larry Dixon (Incumbent)	36,716	77.61	+4.83
Democratic	Hobson Cox	8,996	19.01	−8.19
Libertarian	Mark Hayden	1,498	3.17	+3.17
Write-in		101	0.21	+0.19
Majority		27,720	58.59	+13.02
Turnout		47,311		
Republican hold				

=== Elections in the 1990s ===
Alabama Senate election, 1998: Senate District 25
Party	Candidate	Votes	%	±%
Republican	Larry Dixon (Incumbent)	34,343	72.78	−27.13
Democratic	Michael Chappell	12,837	27.20	+27.20
Write-in		10	0.02	-0.07
Majority		21,506	45.57	
Turnout		47,190		
Republican hold				

Alabama Senate election, 1994: Senate District 25
Party	Candidate	Votes	%	±%
Republican	Larry Dixon (Incumbent)	32,679	99.91	+0.04
Write-in		31	0.09	-0.04
Majority		32,648	99.81	+0.07
Turnout		32,710		
Republican hold				

Alabama Senate election, 1990: Senate District 25
Party	Candidate	Votes	%	±%
Republican	Larry Dixon (Incumbent)	27,158	99.87	+23.75
Write-in		35	0.13	+0.13
Majority		27,123	99.74	+47.49
Turnout		27,193		
Republican hold				

=== Elections in the 1980s ===
Alabama Senate election, 1986: Senate District 25
Party	Candidate	Votes	%	±%
Republican	Larry Dixon (Incumbent)	33,459	76.12	−23.88
Democratic	Jas. Chernau	10,494	23.88	+23.88
Majority		22,965	52.25	−47.75
Turnout		43,953		
Republican hold				

Alabama Senate election, 1983: Senate District 25
Party	Candidate	Votes	%	±%
Republican	Larry Dixon	10,278	100.00	+0.01
Majority		10,278	100.00	+0.02
Turnout		10,278		
Republican gain from Democratic				

Alabama Senate election, 1982: Senate District 25
Party	Candidate	Votes	%	±%
Democratic	E. C. Foshee	20,331	99.99	
Write-in		2	0.01	
Majority		20,329	99.98	
Turnout		20,333		
Democratic hold				

== District officeholders ==
Senators take office at midnight on the day of their election.

- Will Barfoot (2018–present)
- Dick Brewbaker (2010–2018)
- Larry Dixon (1983–2010)
- E. C. Foshee (1982–1983)
- Wallace Miller (1976–1982)
- E. C. Foshee (1974–1976)
- L. D. Owen Jr. (1970–1974)
- J. Ernest Jackson (1966–1970)
- W. Ray Lolley (1962–1966)
- Alton L. Turner (1958–1962)
- Ben Reeves (1954–1958)
