= Alabama's 35th Senate district =

Alabama's 35th State Senate district
Senator
David Sessions; R–Grand Bay
- Demographics: 71.2% White; 18.5% Black; 3.7% Hispanic; 3.8% Asian
- Population (2022): 135,347

Alabama's 35th Senate district is one of 35 districts in the Alabama Senate. The district has been represented by David Sessions since 2018.

== Geography ==
Election	Map	Counties in District
2026; 2022		Portion of Mobile
2018		Portion of Mobile
2014		Portion of Mobile
2010; 2006; 2002		Portion of Mobile

== Election history ==
=== Elections in the 2020s ===
Alabama Senate election, 2022: Senate District 35
Party	Candidate	Votes	%	±%
Republican	David Sessions (Incumbent)	27,133	85.30	+17.72
Libertarian	Clifton Hudson	4,488	14.11	+14.11
Write-in		189	0.59	+0.50
Majority		22,645	71.19	+35.94
Turnout		31,810		
Republican hold				

=== Elections in the 2010s ===
Alabama Senate election, 2018: Senate District 35
Party	Candidate	Votes	%	±%
Republican	David Sessions	29,046	67.58	−6.02
Democratic	Tom Holmes	13,896	32.33	+5.99
Write-in		37	0.09	+0.03
Majority		15,150	35.25	−12.01
Turnout		42,979		
Republican hold				

Alabama Senate election, 2014: Senate District 35
Party	Candidate	Votes	%	±%
Republican	Bill Hightower (Incumbent)	19,173	73.60	+14.49
Democratic	Beau Doolittle	6,862	26.34	−14.51
Write-in		16	0.06	+0.02
Majority		12,311	47.26	+29.00
Turnout		26,051		
Republican hold				

Senate District 35 special Republican runoff - 12 March 2013
Party	Candidate	Votes	%
Republican	Bill Hightower	4,232	64.20
Republican	Jim Barton	2,360	35.80
Majority		1,872	28.40
Turnout		6,592	

Hightower was unopposed in the special election; as such, the election was cancelled and he was declared elected without a vote.

Alabama Senate election, 2010: Senate District 35
Party	Candidate	Votes	%	±%
Republican	Ben Brooks (Incumbent)	18,307	59.11	+8.23
Democratic	Scott A. Buzbee	12,653	40.85	−8.17
Write-in		11	0.04	-0.05
Majority		5,654	18.26	+16.40
Turnout		30,971		
Republican hold				

=== Elections in the 2000s ===
Alabama Senate election, 2006: Senate District 35
Party	Candidate	Votes	%	±%
Republican	Ben Brooks	13,945	50.88	+1.86
Democratic	Gary Tanner (Incumbent)	13,434	49.02	−1.91
Write-in		26	0.09	+0.04
Majority		511	1.86	−0.05
Turnout		27,405		
Republican gain from Democratic				

Alabama Senate election, 2002: Senate District 35
Party	Candidate	Votes	%	±%
Democratic	Gary Tanner	15,826	50.93	+9.41
Republican	George Callahan (Incumbent)	15,234	49.02	−9.42
Write-in		14	0.05	-0.01
Majority		592	1.91	−15.01
Turnout		31,074		
Democratic gain from Republican				

=== Elections in the 1990s ===
Alabama Senate election, 1998: Senate District 35
Party	Candidate	Votes	%	±%
Republican	George Callahan	16,359	58.44	+15.86
Democratic	Charlie L. Staten	11,622	41.52	−15.89
Write-in		11	0.04	+0.02
Majority		4,737	16.92	+2.09
Turnout		27,992		
Republican gain from Democratic				

Alabama Senate election, 1994: Senate District 35
Party	Candidate	Votes	%	±%
Democratic	Steve Windom (Incumbent)	14,727	57.41	−6.95
Republican	Dennis Hebert	10,922	42.58	+6.95
Write-in		4	0.02	+0.01
Majority		3,805	14.83	−13.90
Turnout		25,653		
Democratic hold				

Windom joined the Republican Party in 1997.

Alabama Senate election, 1990: Senate District 35
Party	Candidate	Votes	%	±%
Democratic	Steve Windom	16,663	64.36	−35.64
Republican	Jerry Lathan	9,225	35.63	+35.63
Write-in		2	0.01	+0.01
Majority		7,438	28.73	−72.27
Turnout		25,890		
Democratic hold				

=== Elections in the 1980s ===
Alabama Senate election, 1986: Senate District 35
Party	Candidate	Votes	%	±%
Democratic	Bill Menton (Incumbent)	15,284	100.00	
Majority		15,284	100.00	
Turnout		36,084		
Democratic hold				

Alabama Senate election, 1983: Senate District 35
Party	Candidate	Votes	%	±%
Democratic	Bill Menton (Incumbent)	6,227	100.00	+43.64
Majority		6,227	100.00	+87.27
Turnout		6,227		
Democratic hold				

Alabama Senate election, 1982: Senate District 35
Party	Candidate	Votes	%	±%
Democratic	Bill Menton	13,008	56.36	
Republican	Gary Tanner	10,071	43.64	
Majority		2,937	12.73	
Turnout		23,079		
Democratic hold				

== District officeholders ==
Senators take office at midnight on the day of their election.

- David Sessions (2018–present)
- Bill Hightower (2013–2018)
- Ben Brooks (2006–2012)
- Gary Tanner (2002–2006)
- George Callahan (1998–2002)
- Steve Windom (1990–1998)
- Bill Menton (1982–1990)
- Bob Glass (1978–1982)
- Bill Roberts (1974–1978)

Not in use 1966–1974.

- Charles H. Adams (1962–1966)
- Carl S. Farmer (1958–1962)
- Richmond Flowers Sr. (1954–1958)
