= David Sessions =

American politician

Member of the Alabama Senate from the 35th district
- Incumbent
- Assumed office November 7, 2018
- Preceded by: Bill Hightower

Member of the Alabama House of Representatives from the 105th district
- In office May 24, 2011 – 2018
- Preceded by: Spencer Collier
- Succeeded by: Chip Brown

Personal details
- Born: Grand Bay, Alabama, U.S.
- Party: Republican
- Spouse: Lisa
- Profession: Farmer

David R. Sessions is a Republican Party member of the Alabama Senate from the 35th district. He was previously a member of the Alabama House of Representatives from House District 105, which encompasses the southern portion of Mobile County, Alabama.

Sessions was elected to office on May 10, 2011, in a special election held to fill the legislative seat left vacant by the appointment of Spencer Collier to the Alabama Department of Homeland Security.

In 2012, Sessions was appointed to the House Committee on Boards, Agencies, and Commissions, the Committee on Education Policy, and the Committee on County and Municipal Government. For the 2014 legislative session he was named to the House Agriculture and Forestry Committee and in 2015 became chairman of the committee.

Sessions is a lifelong resident of Grand Bay, Alabama, where he operates a farming business with his brother. He is married to the former Lisa M. Driskell.
