= Alabama Memorial Preservation Act =

2017 U.S. state law

Alabama Legislature
- Long title: Alabama Memorial Preservation Act of 2017
- Citation: Ala. Code § 41-9-230 through 237
- Signed: May 25, 2017

Legislative history
- Bill citation: SB 60
- Introduced by: Sen. Gerald Allen (R)
- First reading: 2017-02-07
- Status: Current legislation

The Alabama Memorial Preservation Act of 2017 (Ala. Code § 41-9-230 through 237, AL Act 2017–354, Senate Bill 60) is an act of law in the U.S. state of Alabama which requires local governments to obtain state permission before moving or renaming historically significant buildings and monuments that date back 40 years or longer.

The bill originated as response to a 2015 attempt by the City of Birmingham, whose residents are predominately black (71%), to remove the Confederate Soldiers and Sailors Monument. The law was ultimately unsuccessful in keeping the monument erect, as the monument was taken down by the city in June 2020, during the George Floyd protests.

The bill, unsuccessfully introduced in 2016, was co-sponsored by Republican Representative Mack Butler and Republican Senator Gerald Allen in March–April 2017, and signed into law by Governor Kay Ivey on May 25, 2017. The law created an Alabama Monument Protection Committee, a group of 11 members who will decide whether historic buildings and monuments may be moved or renamed. African-American lawmakers like Juandalynn Givan, Napoleon Bracy Jr. and Hank Sanders were opposed to the bill.

== Enforcement ==
In 2017, after Birmingham Mayor William A. Bell draped a Confederate memorial with plastic, surrounded it with plywood and stated "This country should in no way tolerate the hatred that the KKK, neo-Nazis, fascists and other hate groups spew", Alabama Attorney General Steve Marshall sued Bell and the City over this violation of the law.

== Lawsuit ==
On January 14, 2019, a circuit judge ruled the law is an unconstitutional violation of the right to free speech, and cannot be enforced. The ruling was put on hold by the Alabama Supreme Court, which subsequently upheld the law unanimously. The penalty for violating the law was fixed at a $25,000 fine. The cities of Birmingham and Mobile paid this fine in 2020 rather than keep their confederate memorials.

== Proposed amendments ==
In the 2021 legislative session, a proposed amendment to the Act sponsored by Representative Mike Holmes did not pass.
