= John Amari =

American judge (1948–2026)

Judge of the 10th Judicial Circuit Court of Alabama
- In office 2009 – February 2019
- Preceded by: Norman Winston
- Succeeded by: Martha Cook

Member of the Alabama Senate
- In office November 3, 1982 – November 4, 1998
- Preceded by: Paschal P. Vacca
- Succeeded by: Steve French
- Constituency: 12th district (1982–1983); 15th district (1983–1998)

Member of the Alabama House of Representatives from the 34th district
- In office November 8, 1978 – November 3, 1982
- Preceded by: Richard R. Andrews
- Succeeded by: George Layton

Personal details
- Born: August 7, 1948 Jefferson County, Alabama, U.S.
- Died: May 27, 2026 (aged 77)
- Party: Republican (1990–2008, 2018–2026); Democratic (until 1990, 2008–2018)
- Spouse: Terri Parker
- Children: 5
- Education: University of Montevallo (BS); Samford University (JD)

John E. Amari (August 7, 1948 – May 27, 2026) was an American lawyer, politician, and judge from Alabama.

== Life and career ==
Born in Roebuck in Jefferson County, Alabama, he received a B.A. from the University of Montevallo, followed by a J.D. from the Cumberland School of Law at Samford University in Birmingham.

Amari was elected to terms in both the Alabama House and the Alabama Senate. In 2006, he unsuccessfully sought election to the Alabama Public Service Commission, but he was elected to a seat on the Alabama District 10 Circuit Court in 2008.

He retired as a judge in 2019 and was replaced by Martha Cook.

Amari died on May 27, 2026, at the age of 77.

Preceded by Richard R. Andrews	Alabama State Representative from District 34 (Jefferson County); 1978–1982	Succeeded by George Layton
Preceded by Paschal P. Vacca	Alabama State Senator from District 12 (now Calhoun and St. Clair counties); 1982–1983	Succeeded by Donald G. Holmes
Preceded by Earl F. Hilliard	Alabama State Senator from District 15 (now Jefferson and Shelby counties); 1983–1998	Succeeded by Steve French
Preceded by Norman G. "Norm" Winston	Alabama 10th Judicial Circuit Court Judge; 2009 – February 2019	Succeeded by Martha Cook
