= Jay Hovey =

American politician (born 1987)

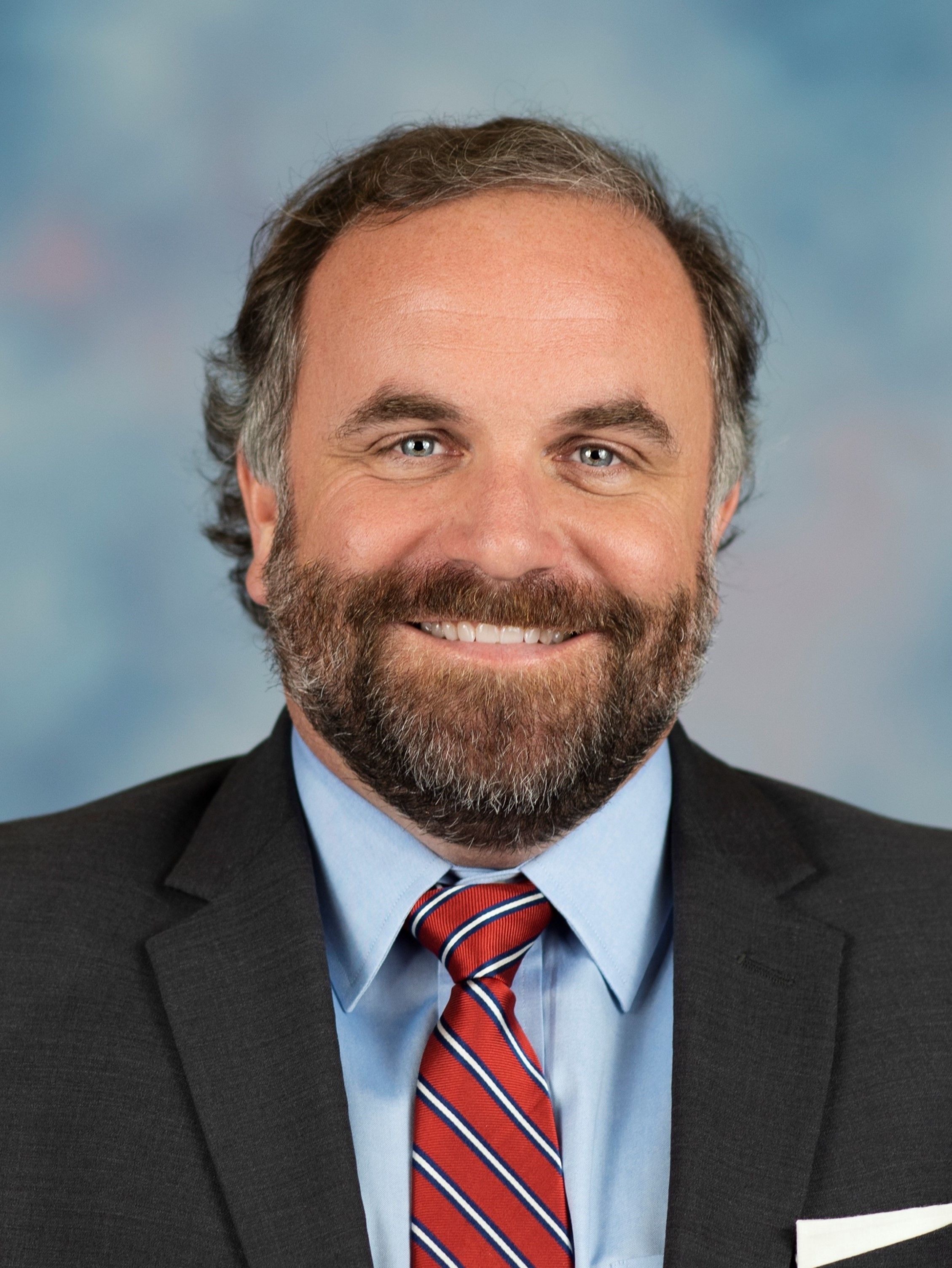

Member of the Alabama Senate from the 27th district
- Incumbent
- Assumed office November 9, 2022
- Preceded by: Tom Whatley

Personal details
- Party: Republican
- Education: Auburn University
- Website: https://jayhoveyforalabama.com

Jay Hovey is an American politician from Marvyn, Alabama.

== Early life and education ==
Hovey is a graduate of Auburn University, and during his time in school he was a student firefighter.

== Political career ==
Hovey started his political career serving as a city council member for Auburn, Alabama's 7th ward for 4 years.

In 2022 Hovey decided to run against three time incumbent Tom Whatley in the Republican primary for Alabama's 27th Senate District. This race would end up being so close the Alabama GOP called it a tie. Eventually it was decided that Hovey had won by a single vote, but Senator Whatley withdrew from the race before a full recount occurred. After the primaries Hovey would go onto to win the general election by a margin of over 40%.

In 2026 Hovey ran for re-election in the primary against Lee County Commissioner for District 1, Doug Cannon. Jay Hovey would win with a margin of 68.9%. Since there were no Democrats running for the seat Hovey won another 4 year term.

== Electoral history ==
Republican primary for Alabama State Senate District 27,2022
Party	Candidate	Votes	%
Republican	Jay Hovey	8,373	50.0%
Republican	Tom Whatley	8,372	50.0%

General election for Alabama State Senate District 27, 2022
Party	Candidate	Votes	%
Republican	Jay Hovey	26,014	70.2%
Democratic	Sherri Reese	10,996	29.7%
Other	Write in	63	0.2%

Republican primary for Alabama State Senate District 27, 2026
Party	Candidate	Votes	%
Republican	Jay Hovey	10,933	68.9%
Republican	Doug Cannon	4,936	31.1%
