= Alabama's 15th Senate district =

Alabama's 15th State Senate district
Senator
Dan Roberts; R–Mountain Brook
- Demographics: 83.5% White; 8.6% Black; 3.8% Hispanic; 1.8% Asian
- Population (2022): 132,318

Alabama's 15th Senate district is one of the 35 districts in the Alabama Senate. The district has been represented by Dan Roberts since 2018.

== Geography ==
Election	Map	Counties in District
2026; 2022		Portions of Jefferson, Shelby
2018		Portions of Jefferson, Shelby, Talladega
2014		Portions of Jefferson, Shelby, Talladega
2010; 2006; 2002		Portions of Jefferson, Shelby

== Election history ==
=== Elections in the 2020s ===
Alabama Senate election, 2022: Senate District 15
Party	Candidate	Votes	%	±%
Republican	Dan Roberts (Incumbent)	35,704	85.55	−11.87
Libertarian	Michael Crump	5,771	13.83	+13.83
Write-in		260	0.62	-1.96
Majority		29,933	71.72	−23.12
Turnout		41,735		
Republican hold				

=== Elections in the 2010s ===
Alabama Senate election, 2018: Senate District 15
Party	Candidate	Votes	%	±%
Republican	Dan Roberts	44,792	97.42	−1.02
Write-in		1,186	2.58	+1.02
Majority		43,606	94.84	−2.05
Turnout		45,978		
Republican hold				

Laura Casey (Democratic Party) withdrew prior to the election.

Alabama Senate election, 2014: Senate District 15
Party	Candidate	Votes	%	±%
Republican	Slade Blackwell (Incumbent)	29,498	98.44	−0.36
Write-in		466	1.56	+0.36
Majority		29,032	96.89	−0.72
Turnout		29,964		
Republican hold				

Alabama Senate election, 2010: Senate District 15
Party	Candidate	Votes	%	±%
Republican	Slade Blackwell	46,018	98.80	+0.06
Write-in		557	1.20	-0.06
Majority		45,461	97.61	+0.12
Turnout		46,575		
Republican hold				

=== Elections in the 2000s ===
Alabama Senate election, 2006: Senate District 15
Party	Candidate	Votes	%	±%
Republican	Steve French (Incumbent)	35,972	98.74	+10.27
Write-in		458	1.26	+0.90
Majority		35,514	97.49	+20.20
Turnout		36,430		
Republican hold				

Alabama Senate election, 2002: Senate District 15
Party	Candidate	Votes	%	±%
Republican	Steve French (Incumbent)	37,003	88.47	−10.22
Libertarian	John Turner	4,675	11.18	+11.18
Write-in		149	0.36	-0.95
Majority		32,328	77.29	
Turnout		41,827		
Republican hold				

=== Elections in the 1990s ===
Alabama Senate election, 1998: Senate District 15
Party	Candidate	Votes	%	±%
Republican	Steve French	29,796	98.69	−0.11
Write-in		396	1.31	+0.11
Majority		29,400	97.38	
Turnout		30,192		
Republican hold				

Alabama Senate election, 1994: Senate District 15
Party	Candidate	Votes	%	±%
Republican	John Amari (Incumbent)	32,505	98.80	+38.94
Write-in		395	1.20	+1.03
Majority		32,110	97.60	
Turnout		32,900		
Republican hold				

Alabama Senate election, 1990: Senate District 15
Party	Candidate	Votes	%	±%
Republican	John Amari (Incumbent)	24,567	59.86	+19.56
Democratic	Charlie Waldrep	16,406	39.97	−19.73
Write-in		71	0.17	+0.17
Majority		8,161	19.88	+0.48
Turnout		41,044		
Republican gain from Democratic				

=== Elections in the 1980s ===
Alabama Senate election, 1986: Senate District 15
Party	Candidate	Votes	%	±%
Democratic	John Amari (Incumbent)	25,626	59.70	−40.30
Republican	Charlie Jones	17,297	40.30	+40.30
Majority		8,329	19.40	−80.60
Turnout		42,923		
Democratic hold				

Amari joined the Republican Party in 1990.

Alabama Senate election, 1983: Senate District 15
Party	Candidate	Votes	%	±%
Democratic	John Amari	5,308	100.00	
Majority		5,308	100.00	
Turnout		5,308		
Democratic hold				

Alabama Senate election, 1982: Senate District 15
Party	Candidate	Votes	%	±%
Democratic	Earl Hilliard Sr. (Incumbent)	15,988	100.00	
Majority		15,988	100.00	
Turnout		15,988		
Democratic hold				

== District officeholders ==
Senators take office at midnight on the day of their election.

- Dan Roberts (2018–present)
- Slade Blackwell (2010–2018)
- Steve French (1998–2010)
- John Amari (1983–1998)
- Earl Hilliard Sr. (1980–1983)
- U. W. Clemon (1974–1980)
- Obie J. Littleton (1970–1974)
- W. G. McCarley (1966–1970)
- Jimmy McDow (1962–1966)
- Joe W. Graham (1958–1962)
- Dave L. Yarbrough (1954–1958)
