= Priscilla Dunn =

American politician (1943–2024)

Member of the Alabama Senate from the 19th district
- In office June 30, 2009 – November 10, 2022
- Preceded by: Edward McClain
- Succeeded by: Merika Coleman

Member of the Alabama House of Representatives from the 56th district
- In office November 4, 1998 – June 30, 2009
- Preceded by: Lawrence McAdory
- Succeeded by: Lawrence McAdory

Personal details
- Born: October 8, 1943
- Died: September 17, 2024 (aged 80)
- Party: Democratic
- Spouse: Grover Dunn
- Children: 1
- Education: Alabama State University; University of Montevallo
- Occupation: Homeless Education Coordinator, Politician

Priscilla Dunn (October 8, 1943 – September 17, 2024) was an American politician who was a member of the Alabama Senate from 2009 to 2022 as a member of the Democratic Party.

== Legislative career ==
From 1998 until 2009 Dunn was a member of the Alabama House of Representatives. She was a member of the Alabama Senate from when a special election was called in 2009. In April 2015 work in the Senate slowed due to a resolution opposing efforts to expand Medicaid. In August 2015 a Senate committee which Dunn was a part of put a ban on selling tissue from aborted fetuses. Dunn cast the sole vote against the ban.

== Personal life and death ==
Dunn was married to her husband, Grover, and had one daughter, Karen. She received her Bachelor of Science from Alabama State University and her Master of Arts from the University of Montevallo. She died on September 17, 2024, at the age of 80.
