= Alabama's 4th Senate district =

American legislative district

Alabama's 4th State Senate district
Senator
Garlan Gudger; R–Cullman
- Demographics: 91.1% White; 1.7% Black; 4% Hispanic; 0.3% Asian
- Population (2022): 141,142

Alabama's 4th Senate district is one of 35 districts in the Alabama Senate. The district has been represented by Garlan Gudger since 2018, defeating incumbent Paul Bussman in a primary election.

== Geography ==
Election	Map	Counties in District
2026; 2022		Cullman, Marion, Winston
2018		Cullman, portions of Lawrence, Marion, Winston
2014		Cullman, portions of Lawrence, Marion, Winston
2010; 2006; 2002		Cullman, portions of Lawrence, Winston

== Election history ==
=== Elections in the 2020s ===
Alabama Senate election, 2022: Senate District 4
Party	Candidate	Votes	%	±%
Republican	Garlan Gudger (Incumbent)	38,265	99.20	+0.05
Write-in		307	0.80	-0.05
Majority		37,958	98.41	+0.12
Turnout		38,572		
Republican hold				

=== Elections in the 2010s ===
Alabama Senate election, 2018: Senate District 4
Party	Candidate	Votes	%	±%
Republican	Garlan Gudger	39,817	99.15	+25.61
Write-in		343	0.85	+0.76
Majority		39,474	98.29	+51.12
Turnout		40,160		
Republican hold				

Alabama's 4th Senate district Republican primary, 2018
Party	Candidate	Votes	%
Republican	Garlan Gudger	14,454	58.6
Republican	Paul Bussman (incumbent)	10,195	41.4
Total votes		24,649	100.00

Alabama Senate election, 2014: Senate District 4
Party	Candidate	Votes	%	±%
Republican	Paul Bussman (Incumbent)	24,750	73.54	+15.88
Democratic	Angelo Mancuso	8,875	26.37	−15.79
Write-in		29	0.09	-0.10
Majority		15,875	47.17	+31.67
Turnout		33,654		
Republican hold				

Alabama's 4th Senate district Republican primary, 2014
Party	Candidate	Votes	%
Republican	Paul Bussman (Incumbent)	12,069	61.4
Republican	Bruce Whitlock	7,597	38.6
Total votes		19,666	100.00

Alabama Senate election, 2010: Senate District 4
Party	Candidate	Votes	%	±%
Republican	Paul Bussman	25,621	57.66	+17.61
Democratic	Zeb Little (Incumbent)	18,733	42.16	−17.70
Write-in		83	0.19	+0.09
Majority		6,888	15.50	−4.31
Turnout		44,437		
Republican gain from Democratic				

=== Elections in the 2000s ===
Alabama Senate election, 2006: Senate District 4
Party	Candidate	Votes	%	±%
Democratic	Zeb Little (Incumbent)	23,389	59.86	−1.84
Republican	Harold Sachs	15,648	40.05	+4.00
Write-in		38	0.10	-0.04
Majority		7,741	19.81	−5.84
Turnout		39,075		
Democratic hold				

Alabama Senate election, 2002: Senate District 4
Party	Candidate	Votes	%	±%
Democratic	Zeb Little (Incumbent)	24,439	61.70	+10.48
Republican	H. Guy Hunt	14,279	36.05	−7.68
Libertarian	Greg Graves	836	2.11	+2.11
Write-in		55	0.14	+0.11
Majority		10,160	25.65	+18.17
Turnout		39,609		
Democratic hold				

=== Elections in the 1990s ===
Alabama Senate election, 1998: Senate District 4
Party	Candidate	Votes	%	±%
Democratic	Zeb Little	21,073	51.22	+13.18
Republican	Don Hale (Incumbent)	17,994	43.73	−17.79
U.S. Taxpayers'	Don Crum	2,066	5.02	+5.02
Write-in		13	0.03	-0.04
Majority		3,079	7.48	−15.64
Turnout		41,146		
Democratic gain from Republican				

Alabama Senate election, 1994: Senate District 4
Party	Candidate	Votes	%	±%
Republican	Don Hale (Incumbent)	23,913	61.52	−38.43
Democratic	D. Farrar	14,928	38.04	+38.04
Write-in		29	0.07	+0.02
Majority		8,985	23.12	−76.77
Turnout		38,870		
Republican hold				

Alabama Senate election, 1990: Senate District 4
Party	Candidate	Votes	%	±%
Republican	Don Hale (Incumbent)	21,903	99.95	+40.87
Write-in		12	0.05	+0.05
Majority		21,891	99.89	81.73
Turnout		21,915		
Republican hold				

=== Elections in the 1980s ===
Alabama Senate election, 1986: Senate District 4
Party	Candidate	Votes	%	±%
Republican	Don Hale	22,627	59.08	+19.31
Democratic	Randall Shedd	15,671	40.91	−5.95
Majority		6,956	18.16	+11.07
Turnout		38,298		
Republican gain from Democratic				

Alabama Senate election, 1983: Senate District 4
Party	Candidate	Votes	%	±%
Democratic	Steve Cooley (Incumbent)	5,687	46.86	−53.14
Republican	Don Hale	4,827	39.77	+39.77
Independent	Morgan Edwards	1,623	13.37	+13.37
Majority		860	7.09	−92.91
Turnout		12,137		
Democratic hold				

Alabama Senate election, 1982: Senate District 4
Party	Candidate	Votes	%	±%
Democratic	Steve Cooley	21,249	100.00	
Majority		21,249	100.00	
Turnout		21,249		
Democratic hold				

== District officeholders ==
Senators take office at midnight on the day of their election.

- Garlan Gudger (2018-present)
- Paul Bussman (2010-2018)
- Zeb Little (1998-2010)
- Don Hale (1986-1998)
- Steve Cooley (1982-1986)
- Finis St. John (1974-1982)
- Kenneth Hammond (1970-1974)
- Dan Stone (1966-1970)
- Roscoe O. Roberts Jr. (1962-1966)
- Dave Archer (1958-1962)
- T. Herman Vann (1954-1958)
