= Alabama's 9th Senate district =

Alabama's 9th State Senate district
Senator
| Wes Kitchens; R–Arab |
- Demographics: 77.8% White; 4.9% Black; 12.9% Hispanic; 1% Asian
- Population (2022): 148,634

Alabama's 9th Senate district is one of 35 districts in the Alabama Senate. The district has been represented by Wes Kitchens since a special election in 2024.

== Geography ==
| Election | Map | Counties in District |
|---|---|---|
| 2026; 2022 | | Marshall, portions of Blount, Madison |
| 2018 | | Marshall, portions of Blount, DeKalb, Madison |
| 2014 | | Marshall, portions of Blount, DeKalb, Madison |
| 2010; 2006; 2002 | | Marshall, portions of Blount, Madison |

== Election history ==
=== Elections in the 2020s ===
2024 Senate District 9 special Republican primary - 9 January 2024
| Party | Candidate | Votes | % |
|---|---|---|---|
| Republican | Wes Kitchens | 3,713 | 52.57 |
| Republican | Brock Colvin | 2,703 | 38.27 |
| Republican | Stacy Lee George | 647 | 9.16 |
| Majority | | 1,010 | 14.30 |
| Turnout | | 7,063 | |

Kitchens was unopposed in the general election; as such, he was declared elected without a vote.

Alabama Senate election, 2022: Senate District 9
| Party | Candidate | Votes | % | ±% |
|---|---|---|---|---|
| Republican | Clay Scofield (Incumbent) | 32,709 | 98.30 | −0.27 |
| Write-in | | 566 | 1.70 | +0.27 |
| Majority | | 32,143 | 96.60 | −0.54 |
| Turnout | | 33,275 | | |
| Republican hold | | | | |

=== Elections in the 2010s ===
Alabama Senate election, 2018: Senate District 9
| Party | Candidate | Votes | % | ±% |
|---|---|---|---|---|
| Republican | Clay Scofield (Incumbent) | 35,192 | 98.57 | +0.04 |
| Write-in | | 510 | 1.43 | -0.04 |
| Majority | | 34,682 | 97.14 | +0.08 |
| Turnout | | 35,702 | | |
| Republican hold | | | | |

Alabama Senate election, 2014: Senate District 9
| Party | Candidate | Votes | % | ±% |
|---|---|---|---|---|
| Republican | Clay Scofield (Incumbent) | 24,596 | 98.53 | +29.73 |
| Write-in | | 367 | 1.47 | +1.37 |
| Majority | | 24,229 | 97.06 | |
| Turnout | | 24,963 | | |
| Republican hold | | | | |

Alabama Senate election, 2010: Senate District 9
| Party | Candidate | Votes | % | ±% |
|---|---|---|---|---|
| Republican | Clay Scofield | 30,834 | 68.80 | +22.34 |
| Democratic | Tim Mitchell | 13,933 | 31.09 | −22.31 |
| Write-in | | 47 | 0.10 | -0.03 |
| Majority | | 16,901 | 37.71 | +30.77 |
| Turnout | | 44,814 | | |
| Republican gain from Democratic | | | | |

=== Elections in the 2000s ===
Alabama Senate election, 2006: Senate District 9
| Party | Candidate | Votes | % | ±% |
|---|---|---|---|---|
| Democratic | Hinton Mitchem (Incumbent) | 21,570 | 53.40 | −5.54 |
| Republican | Bill Ingram | 18,766 | 46.46 | +5.75 |
| Write-in | | 54 | 0.13 | -0.21 |
| Majority | | 2,804 | 6.94 | −11.29 |
| Turnout | | 40,390 | | |
| Democratic hold | | | | |

Alabama Senate election, 2002: Senate District 9
| Party | Candidate | Votes | % | ±% |
|---|---|---|---|---|
| Democratic | Hinton Mitchem (Incumbent) | 24,603 | 58.94 | −5.87 |
| Republican | Doris Edmonds | 16,995 | 40.71 | +5.54 |
| Write-in | | 144 | 0.34 | +0.31 |
| Majority | | 7,608 | 18.23 | −11.41 |
| Turnout | | 41,742 | | |
| Democratic hold | | | | |

=== Elections in the 1990s ===
Alabama Senate election, 1998: Senate District 9
| Party | Candidate | Votes | % | ±% |
|---|---|---|---|---|
| Democratic | Hinton Mitchem (Incumbent) | 24,770 | 64.81 | +7.42 |
| Republican | Steven King | 13,441 | 35.17 | −7.44 |
| Write-in | | 10 | 0.03 | +0.02 |
| Majority | | 11,329 | 29.64 | |
| Turnout | | 38,221 | | |
| Democratic hold | | | | |

Alabama Senate election, 1994: Senate District 9
| Party | Candidate | Votes | % | ±% |
|---|---|---|---|---|
| Democratic | Hinton Mitchem (Incumbent) | 18,740 | 57.39 | −42.59 |
| Republican | D. Good | 13,914 | 42.61 | +42.61 |
| Write-in | | 2 | 0.01 | -0.01 |
| Majority | | 4,826 | 14.78 | −85.18 |
| Turnout | | 32,656 | | |
| Democratic hold | | | | |

Alabama Senate election, 1990: Senate District 9
| Party | Candidate | Votes | % | ±% |
|---|---|---|---|---|
| Democratic | Hinton Mitchem (Incumbent) | 19,081 | 99.98 | +33.00 |
| Write-in | | 3 | 0.02 | -0.03 |
| Majority | | 19,078 | 99.96 | +65.96 |
| Turnout | | 19,084 | | |
| Democratic hold | | | | |

=== Elections in the 1980s ===
1987 Alabama Senate District 9 special election - 2 June 1987
| Party | Candidate | Votes | % | ±% |
|---|---|---|---|---|
| Democratic | Hinton Mitchem | 6,758 | 66.98 | −33.02 |
| Republican | Nell Skidmore | 3,327 | 32.97 | +32.97 |
| Write-in | | 5 | 0.05 | +0.05 |
| Majority | | 3,431 | 34.00 | −66.00 |
| Turnout | | 10,090 | | |
| Democratic hold | | | | |

Alabama Senate election, 1986: Senate District 9
| Party | Candidate | Votes | % | ±% |
|---|---|---|---|---|
| Democratic | Loyd Coleman | 15,382 | 100.00 | +0.65 |
| Majority | | 15,382 | 100.00 | +1.30 |
| Turnout | | 15,382 | | |
| Democratic hold | | | | |

Alabama Senate election, 1983: Senate District 9
| Party | Candidate | Votes | % | ±% |
|---|---|---|---|---|
| Democratic | Hinton Mitchem (Incumbent) | 4,588 | 99.35 | −0.64 |
| Write-in | | 30 | 0.65 | +0.64 |
| Majority | | 4,558 | 98.70 | |
| Turnout | | 4,618 | | |
| Democratic hold | | | | |

Alabama Senate election, 1982: Senate District 9
| Party | Candidate | Votes | % | ±% |
|---|---|---|---|---|
| Democratic | Hinton Mitchem (Incumbent) | 19,485 | 99.99 | |
| Write-in | | 1 | 0.01 | |
| Majority | | 19,484 | 99.98 | |
| Turnout | | 19,486 | | |
| Democratic hold | | | | |

== District officeholders ==
Senators take office at midnight on the day of their election.

- Wes Kitchens (2024–present)
- Clay Scofield (2010–2024)
- Hinton Mitchem (1987–2010)
- Loyd Coleman (1986–1987)
- Hinton Mitchem (1978–1986)
- Sid McDonald (1974–1978)
- Fred Ray Lybrand (1970–1974)
- Woodrow Albea (1966–1970)
- Julian Lowe (1962–1966)
- Bill Hines (1958–1962)
- George W. Yarbrough (1954–1958)
