= Merika Coleman =

American politician (born 1973)

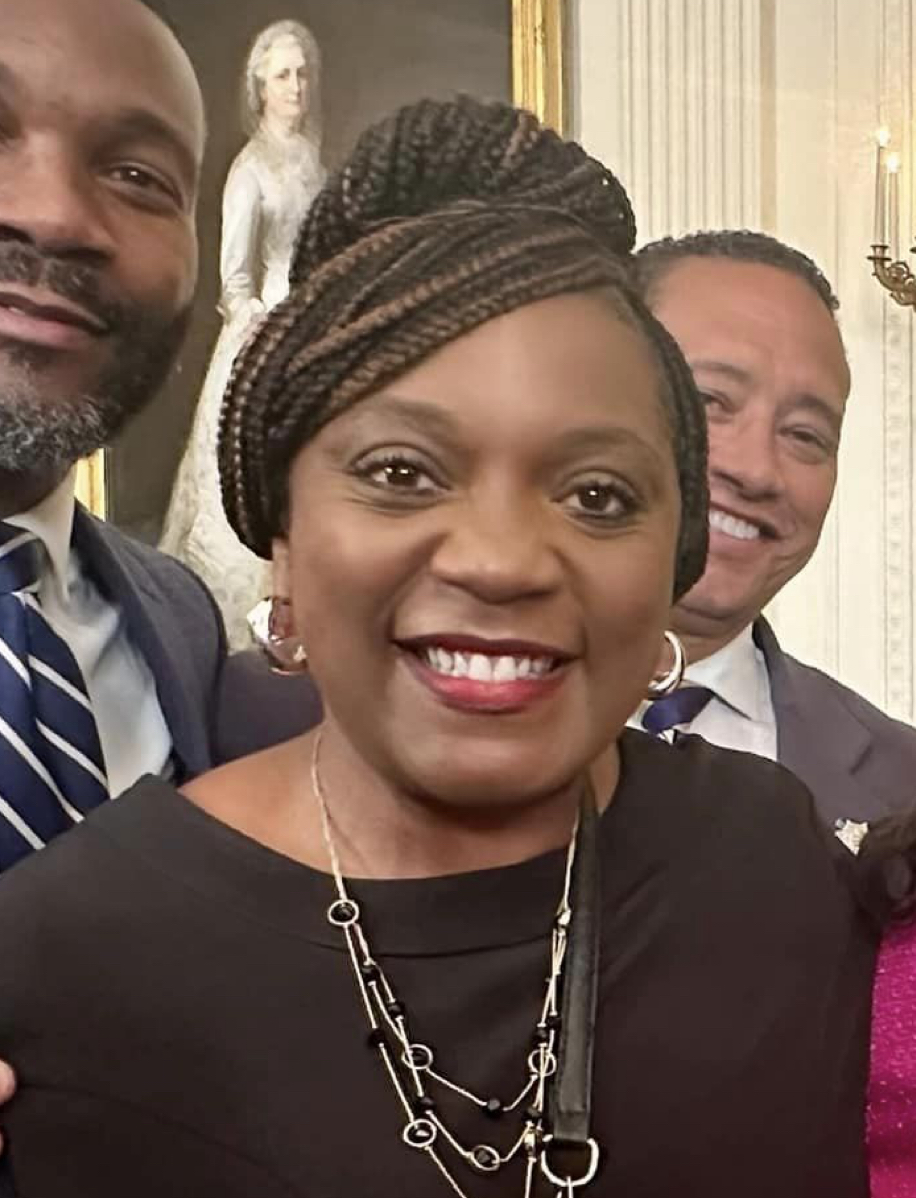

Member of the Alabama Senate from the 19th district
- Incumbent
- Assumed office November 10, 2022
- Preceded by: Priscilla Dunn

Member of the Alabama House of Representatives from the 57th district
- In office November 6, 2002 – November 10, 2022
- Preceded by: Tommie Houston
- Succeeded by: Patrick Sellers

Personal details
- Born: September 6, 1973 (age 52) RAF Lakenheath, England
- Party: Democratic
- Education: University of Alabama, Birmingham (BA, MPA)

Merika Coleman (born September 6, 1973) is an American politician who is a member of the Alabama Senate, representing the 19th district since 2022. She previously served in the Alabama House of Representatives, representing its 57th district from 2002 to 2022.

== Early life ==
Coleman was born at RAF Lakenheath in Suffolk, England, in 1973.

== Education and early career ==
Coleman received a B.A. in mass communication in 1995 and a Master of Public Administration in 1997, both from the University of Alabama at Birmingham.

Earlier in her career, Coleman worked as a public policy analyst and strategist in nonprofits. She became the Director of Community and Economic Development for Lawson State Community College, and later became Director of Economic and Community Development for the City of Bessemer, Alabama.

== Political career ==
In 2002, Coleman was elected to the Alabama House of Representatives. In 2004 she was a Fleming Fellow with the Center for Policy Alternatives.

In 2009, Coleman ran for a State Senate seat in a special election. She placed second among the eight candidates in the primary, and advanced to the runoff election. She lost the runoff to Priscilla Dunn. She won her 2010 House reelection campaign with 68% of the vote.

As of 2017, she was Chair of the Boards and Commissions Committee, and served on the Judiciary, Ways and Means General Fund, and Banking Committees. In February 2017, she became Assistant Minority Leader of the House of Representatives. Coleman is also an Assistant Professor of Political Science at Miles College in Fairfield, Alabama.

In 2022, Coleman announced that she would seek the open senate seat vacated by retiring senator Priscilla Dunn. Coleman defeated fellow state representative Louise Alexander in the primary and was unopposed in the general election.

=== Political positions ===
Coleman cosponsored a bill criminalizing human trafficking in Alabama, which became law in 2010. At the time, Alabama was one of six states to not have a human trafficking law. Coleman has also sponsored bills on parole reform and adding restrictions to Alabama's Stand Your Ground law.

In response to Governor Kay Ivey signing a near-total abortion ban in 2019, Coleman said "These men need to stay out of our wombs". She also said that the law would lead to more unsafe abortions and "abortions in back alleys".

Coleman supported Roe v. Wade. Following it being overturned in 2022, she and most of her democratic colleagues in the Alabama Senate, particularly senator Vivian Davis Figures, would sponsor bills designed to protect abortion, although none of them were passed.

== Congressional race ==
In November 2023, Coleman announced her candidacy to represent Alabama's 2nd congressional district in the U.S. House of Representatives. During her campaign, she said if she were elected to congress, she would focus on reform around voting rights and health care. She lost the primary to Shomari Figures. She received about 6% of the vote and got fourth place.
