= Dick Brewbaker =

American politician (born 1961)

Member of the Alabama Senate from the 25th district
- In office November 3, 2010 – November 7, 2018
- Preceded by: Larry Dixon
- Succeeded by: Will Barfoot

Member of the Alabama House of Representatives from the 75th district
- In office January 2003 – January 2007
- Preceded by: Greg Wren
- Succeeded by: Greg Wren

Personal details
- Born: Dick Lansden Brewbaker; January 28, 1961 (age 65)
- Party: Republican
- Education: Vanderbilt University (BS)

Dick Lansden Brewbaker (born January 28, 1961) is an American politician who was a Republican member of the Alabama Senate for the 25th district, encompassing parts of Montgomery County and Elmore County, from 2010 to 2018.

== Early life and career ==
Dick Brewbaker attended the Montgomery Academy. He graduated from Vanderbilt University in Nashville, Tennessee. He then taught in a number of schools, including the Montgomery Academy.

He worked as the state director of SCORE 100, an education reform initiative. He was appointed by Governor Fob James as an education liaison to the Alabama House of Representatives and to the Alabama State Board of Education. He was the president and CEO of Brewbaker Motors, a family business started by his grandfather in 1941. The dealership was sold off in 2023.

== Political career ==
From 2003 to 2007, he was a member of the Alabama House of Representatives for the 75th district. Brewbaker was elected to the Alabama Senate in 2010 and served until his retirement in 2018.

=== 2024 congressional race ===
In November 2023, Brewbaker announced his candidacy to represent Alabama's 2nd congressional district in the U.S. House of Representatives. He ran as a Republican in the March 5, 2024, primary election. Brewbaker said that, if elected, he would serve no more than ten years in Congress. He also compared himself to Representative Robert Aderholt, saying that officials should get back to being "serious about governing" and move away from "Matt Gaetz types". A poll in December 2023 showed Brewbaker leading among candidates for the Republican nomination, though a majority of voters were still undecided. In January 2024, Brewbaker launched a television advertising campaign, in which he highlighted three areas of focus, including "liberty, security, and limited government".

In the Republican primary, Brewbaker received around 39.6% of the vote, leading a field of seven candidates, and advanced to a runoff against attorney Caroleene Dobson. Dobson defeated Brewbaker in the runoff.

== Personal life ==
Brewbaker is married with five children. He attends a Presbyterian church, where he is an elder.
