= Alabama's 19th Senate district =

Alabama's 19th State Senate district
Senator
Merika Coleman; D–Pleasant Grove
- Demographics: 32.0% White; 61.2% Black; 3.8% Hispanic; 0.5% Asian
- Population (2022): 139,203

Alabama's 19th Senate district is one of 35 districts in the Alabama Senate. The district has been represented by Merika Coleman since 2022.

== Geography ==
Election	Map	Counties in District
2026; 2022		Portion of Jefferson
2018		Portion of Jefferson
2014		Portion of Jefferson
2010; 2006; 2002		Portion of Jefferson

== Election history ==
=== Elections in the 2020s ===
Alabama Senate election, 2022: Senate District 19
Party	Candidate	Votes	%	±%
Democratic	Merika Coleman	26,369	86.52	−11.66
Libertarian	Danny Wilson	3,904	12.81	+12.81
Write-in		204	0.67	-1.15
Majority		22,465	73.71	−22.66
Turnout		30,477		
Democratic hold				

=== Elections in the 2010s ===
Alabama Senate election, 2018: Senate District 19
Party	Candidate	Votes	%	±%
Democratic	Priscilla Dunn (Incumbent)	38,668	98.18	−0.55
Write-in		715	1.82	+0.55
Majority		37,953	96.37	−1.09
Turnout		39,383		
Democratic hold				

Alabama Senate election, 2014: Senate District 19
Party	Candidate	Votes	%	±%
Democratic	Priscilla Dunn (Incumbent)	27,143	98.73	−0.17
Write-in		349	1.27	+0.17
Majority		26,794	97.46	−0.35
Turnout		27,492		
Democratic hold				

Alabama Senate election, 2010: Senate District 19
Party	Candidate	Votes	%	±%
Democratic	Priscilla Dunn (Incumbent)	29,227	98.90	−0.03
Write-in		324	1.10	+0.03
Majority		28,903	97.81	−0.04
Turnout		29,551		
Democratic hold				

=== Elections in the 2000s ===
Alabama Senate District 19 special Democratic primary - 30 June 2009
Party	Candidate	Votes	%
Democratic	Priscilla Dunn	3,444	56.00
Democratic	Merika Coleman	2,706	44.00
Majority		738	12.00
Turnout		6,150	
Democratic hold			

Dunn was unopposed in the general election; as such, the election was cancelled and Dunn was declared elected without a vote.

Alabama Senate election, 2006: Senate District 19
Party	Candidate	Votes	%	±%
Democratic	Edward McClain (Incumbent)	23,600	98.93	+22.14
Write-in		256	1.07	+0.96
Majority		23,344	97.85	+44.17
Turnout		23,856		
Democratic hold				

Alabama Senate election, 2002: Senate District 19
Party	Candidate	Votes	%	±%
Democratic	Edward McClain (Incumbent)	28,085	76.79	−22.51
Republican	Cliff Walker	8,451	23.11	+23.11
Write-in		39	0.11	-0.59
Majority		19,634	53.68	−44.92
Turnout		36,575		
Democratic hold				

=== Elections in the 1990s ===
Alabama Senate election, 1998: Senate District 19
Party	Candidate	Votes	%	±%
Democratic	Edward McClain (Incumbent)	27,296	99.30	+0.30
Write-in		193	0.70	-0.30
Majority		27,103	98.60	+0.61
Turnout		27,489		
Democratic hold				

Alabama Senate election, 1994: Senate District 19
Party	Candidate	Votes	%	±%
Democratic	Edward McClain	23,942	99.00	+0.42
Write-in		243	1.00	-0.42
Majority		23,699	97.99	+0.84
Turnout		24,185		
Democratic hold				

Alabama Senate election, 1990: Senate District 19
Party	Candidate	Votes	%	±%
Democratic	James R. Bennett (Incumbent)	24,231	98.58	−1.42
Write-in		350	1.42	+1.42
Majority		23,881	97.15	−2.85
Turnout		24,581		
Democratic hold				

=== Elections in the 1980s ===
Alabama Senate election, 1986: Senate District 19
Party	Candidate	Votes	%	±%
Democratic	James R. Bennett (Incumbent)	27,507	100.00	
Majority		27,507	100.00	
Turnout		27,507		
Democratic hold				

Alabama Senate election, 1983: Senate District 19
Party	Candidate	Votes	%	±%
Democratic	James R. Bennett	6,977	100.00	
Majority		6,977	100.00	
Turnout		6,977		
Democratic hold				

Alabama Senate election, 1982: Senate District 19
Party	Candidate	Votes	%	±%
Democratic	John Teague (Incumbent)	22,086	100.00	
Write-in		1	0.00	
Majority		22,085	99.99	
Turnout		22,087		
Democratic hold				

== District officeholders ==
Senators take office at midnight on the day of their election.

- Merika Coleman (2022–present)
- Priscilla Dunn (2009–2022)
- Edward McClain (1994–2009)
- James R. Bennett (1983–1994)
- John Teague (1976–1983)
- Robert Weaver (1974–1976)
- William Melton (1973–1974)
- Roland Cooper (1966–1974)
- Albert Evans Jr. (1962–1966)
- Dennis Porter (1958–1962)
- Gerald Bradford (1954–1958)
