= Gerald Allen (politician) =

American politician

Member of the Alabama Senate from the 21st district
- Incumbent
- Assumed office November 3, 2010
- Preceded by: Phil Poole

Member of the Alabama House of Representatives from the 62nd district
- In office 1994 – November 3, 2010
- Succeeded by: John Merrill

Personal details
- Born: February 8, 1950 (age 76) Tuscaloosa, Alabama, U.S.
- Party: Democratic (before 1995); Republican (1995–present)
- Children: Wes Allen

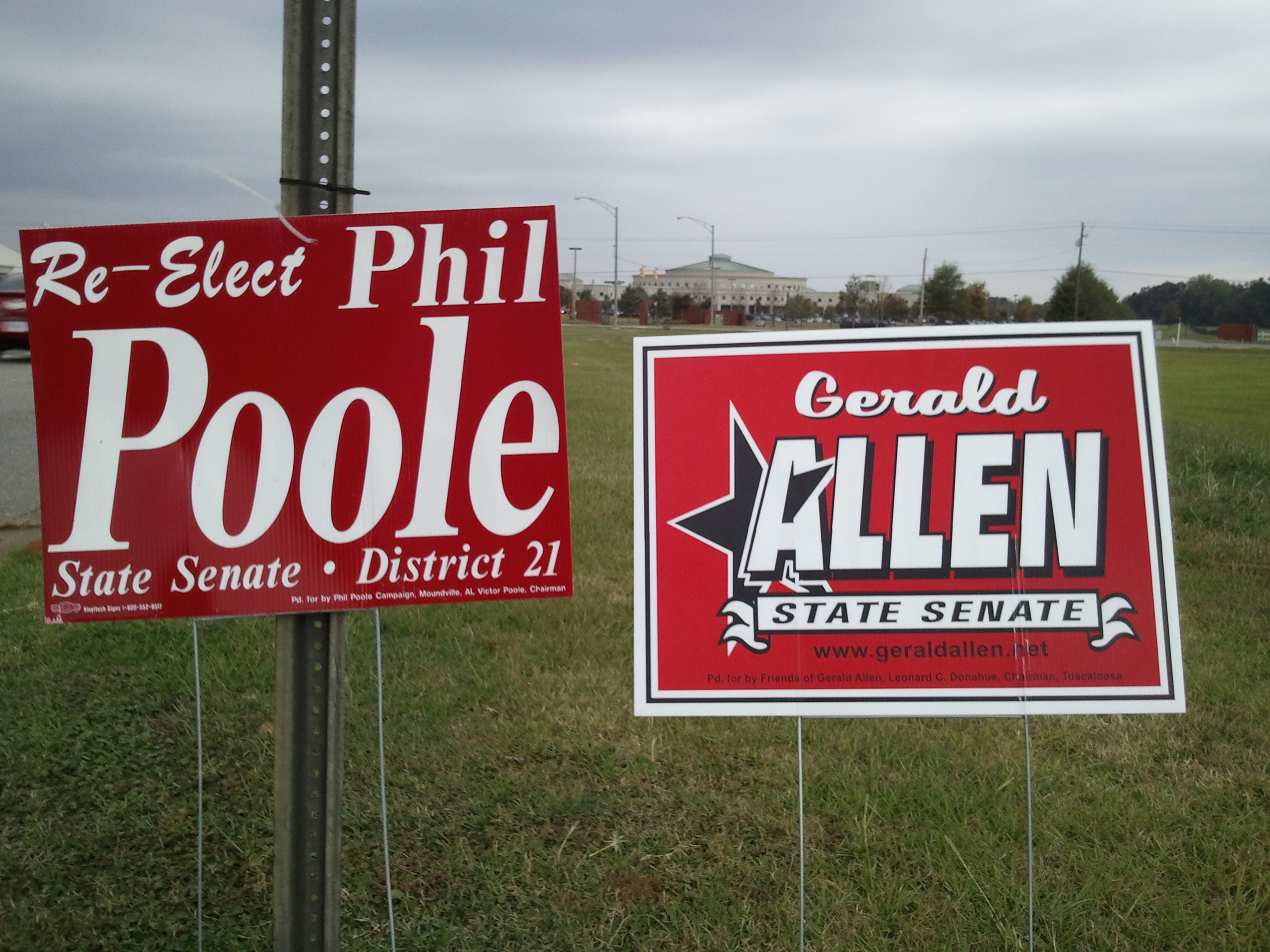
Gerald Allen for Senate sign in Tuscaloosa, next to that of his competitor

Gerald H. Allen (born February 8, 1950) is a Republican lawmaker in the Alabama Senate. Before that he was a member of the Alabama House of Representatives.

== Early life ==
Gerald H. Allen was born on February 8, 1950, in Tuscaloosa, Alabama.

== Career ==
Allen was first elected to the Alabama House in 1994.

Allen defeated incumbent Phil Poole, a Democrat, in the 2010 elections to the Alabama Senate. In 2011, Allen proposed a bill to ban Sharia law. He sponsored a 2014 amendment to the Alabama Constitution banning "foreign law".

In 2017, Allen sponsored a bill for the Alabama Memorial Preservation Act to preserve historical Confederate monuments in Alabama.

== Personal life ==
Allen is the father of incumbent Secretary of State of Alabama and former state representative Wes Allen. Both made history for being the first father and son to serve at the same time in the Alabama legislature when Wes Allen was elected to the House in 2018.
