= Garlan Gudger =

American politician (born 1975)

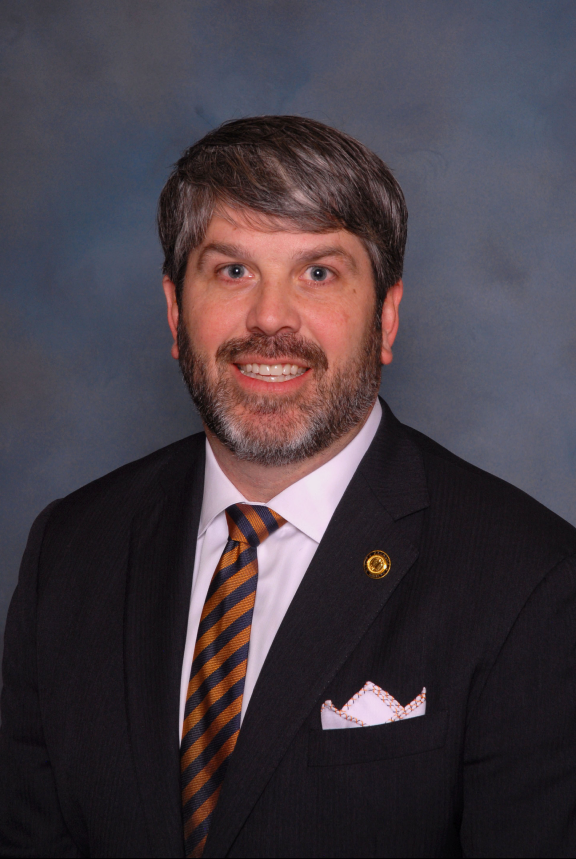

President pro tempore of the Alabama Senate
- Incumbent
- Assumed office February 4, 2025
- Preceded by: Greg Reed

Member of the Alabama Senate from the 4th district
- Incumbent
- Assumed office November 7, 2018
- Preceded by: Paul Bussman

Personal details
- Born: April 12, 1975 (age 51)
- Party: Republican
- Spouse: Heather
- Children: 2
- Education: Samford University (attended); Auburn University (BS)

Garlan Gudger Jr. (born April 12, 1975) is an American politician. A Republican, he is a member of the Alabama Senate, representing the 4th district since November 7, 2018. He is the second-generation owner of the antiques store Southern Accents Architectural Antiques. He is a major supporter of the Alabama abortion ban, which aims to criminalize abortion in the state of Alabama. He is also a member of the Small Business Commission. On December 3, 2024, the Alabama Republican Senate Caucus selected Senator Garlan Gudger as their nominee for Senate President Pro Tempore. The election was held following the retirement of Senator Greg Reed.

Alabama Senate
Preceded by Greg Reed	President pro tempore of the Alabama Senate; 2025–present	Incumbent
