= Alabama's 13th Senate district =

Alabama's 13th State Senate district
Senator
Randy Price; R–Opelika
- Demographics: 70.2% White; 22.7% Black; 3.5% Hispanic; 0.8% Asian
- Population (2022): 151,173

Alabama's 13th Senate district is one of 35 districts in the Alabama Senate. The district has been represented by Randy Price since 2018.

== Geography ==
Election	Map	Counties in District
2026; 2022		Chambers, Clay, Cleburne, Randolph, portion of Lee
2018		Chambers, Clay, Cleburne, Randolph, portion of Lee
2014		Chambers, Cleburne, Randolph, portions of Cherokee, Clay, Lee
2010; 2006; 2002		Chambers, Clay, Cleburne, Randolph, portions of Cherokee, Lee

== Election history ==
=== Elections in the 2020s ===
Alabama Senate election, 2022: Senate District 13
Party	Candidate	Votes	%	±%
Republican	Randy Price (Incumbent)	31,759	98.15	+27.08
Write-in		597	1.85	+1.78
Majority		31,162	96.31	+54.11
Turnout		32,356		
Republican hold				

=== Elections in the 2010s ===
Alabama Senate election, 2018: Senate District 13
Party	Candidate	Votes	%	±%
Republican	Randy Price	31,614	71.07	+16.88
Democratic	Darrell Turner	12,839	28.86	−4.85
Write-in		33	0.07	-0.07
Majority		18,775	42.20	+21.72
Turnout		44,486		
Republican hold				

Alabama Senate election, 2014: Senate District 13
Party	Candidate	Votes	%	±%
Republican	Gerald Dial (Incumbent)	16,758	54.19	+3.78
Democratic	Darrell Turner	10,424	33.71	−15.74
Independent	Bill Fuller	3,697	11.96	+11.96
Write-in		43	0.14	+0.01
Majority		6,334	20.48	+19.52
Turnout		30,922		
Republican hold				

Alabama Senate election, 2010: Senate District 13
Party	Candidate	Votes	%	±%
Republican	Gerald Dial	18,800	50.41	+1.05
Democratic	Greg Varner	18,443	49.45	−1.04
Write-in		50	0.13	-0.02
Majority		357	0.96	−0.17
Turnout		37,293		
Republican gain from Democratic				

=== Elections in the 2000s ===
Alabama Senate election, 2006: Senate District 13
Party	Candidate	Votes	%	±%
Democratic	Kim Benefield	16,009	50.49	−48.77
Republican	Jim C. Ingram	15,652	49.36	+49.36
Write-in		46	0.15	-0.59
Majority		357	1.13	−97.40
Turnout		31,707		
Democratic hold				

Alabama Senate election, 2002: Senate District 13
Party	Candidate	Votes	%	±%
Democratic	Gerald Dial (Incumbent)	24,528	99.26	+30.70
Write-in		182	0.74	+0.72
Majority		24,346	98.53	+61.39
Turnout		24,710		
Democratic hold				

=== Elections in the 1990s ===
Alabama Senate election, 1998: Senate District 13
Party	Candidate	Votes	%	±%
Democratic	Gerald Dial (Incumbent)	23,091	68.56	−30.69
Republican	Diane Branch	10,582	31.42	+31.42
Write-in		7	0.02	-0.73
Majority		12,509	37.14	−61.37
Turnout		33,680		
Democratic hold				

Alabama Senate election, 1994: Senate District 13
Party	Candidate	Votes	%	±%
Democratic	Gerald Dial (Incumbent)	21,008	99.25	−0.74
Write-in		158	0.75	+0.74
Majority		20,850	98.51	−1.48
Turnout		21,166		
Democratic hold				

Alabama Senate election, 1990: Senate District 13
Party	Candidate	Votes	%	±%
Democratic	Gerald Dial (Incumbent)	19,096	99.99	−0.01
Write-in		1	0.01	+0.01
Majority		19,095	99.99	−0.01
Turnout		19,097		
Democratic hold				

=== Elections in the 1980s ===
Alabama Senate election, 1986: Senate District 13
Party	Candidate	Votes	%	±%
Democratic	Gerald Dial (Incumbent)	19,575	100.00	+52.87
Majority		19,575	100.00	+94.28
Turnout		19,575		
Democratic gain from Independent				

Alabama Senate election, 1983: Senate District 13
Party	Candidate	Votes	%	±%
Independent	Gerald Dial	7,386	52.85	+52.85
Democratic	John Sears Casey	6,587	47.13	−52.87
Write-in		2	0.01	+0.01
Majority		799	5.72	−94.28
Turnout		13,975		
Independent gain from Democratic				

Alabama Senate election, 1982: Senate District 13
Party	Candidate	Votes	%	±%
Democratic	J. Richmond Pearson (Incumbent)	21,315	100.00	
Majority		21,315	100.00	
Turnout		21,315		
Democratic hold				

== District officeholders ==
Senators take office at midnight on the day of their election.

- Randy Price (2018–present)
- Gerald Dial (2010–2018)
- Kim Benefield (2006–2010)
- Gerald Dial (1983–2006)
- J. Richmond Pearson (1974–1983)
- Robert Weaver (1970–1974)
- G. Kyser Leonard (1966–1970)
- Larry Dumas (1958–1966)
- Albert Boutwell (1946–1958)
