= Bill Hightower =

American politician

Member of the Alabama Senate from the 35th district
- In office March 29, 2013 – November 7, 2018
- Preceded by: Ben Brooks
- Succeeded by: David Sessions

Personal details
- Born: 1959 (age 66–67)
- Party: Republican
- Spouse: Susan
- Education: University of South Alabama (BS); Vanderbilt University (MBA)
- Website: Official website

Bill Hightower (born 1959) is an American politician from the state of Alabama. From 2013 through 2018, he was a Republican member of the Alabama Senate, representing the 35th district.

== Early life and education ==
Hightower was raised in Mobile, Alabama, where his father worked at the University of South Alabama's medical center. Hightower graduated from the University of South Alabama with a Bachelor of Science in business and finance in 1984. After working in a textile factory in Saraland, Alabama, he attended Vanderbilt University, where he earned a Master of Business Administration in 1990.

== Career ==
Hightower owns a corporate consulting firm. Hightower's wife, Susan, ran for the Alabama House of Representatives seat for the 103rd district in 2013, but lost to Margie Wilcox.

Hightower won a special election to the Alabama Senate on March 12, 2013, to succeed Ben Brooks. In 2014, the Sunlight Foundation ranked Hightower as the fourth-most conservative member of the state senate. Hightower was re-elected in November 2014.

Hightower ran for governor of Alabama in the 2018 election. He finished in fourth place in the Republican primary, receiving 4% of the vote, and endorsed Kay Ivey in the general election.

With Bradley Byrne, who represents Alabama's 1st congressional district in the United States House of Representatives, opting not to run for reelection in the 2020 elections, Hightower announced his candidacy to succeed Byrne in April 2019. He advanced to the runoff election, where he lost to Jerry Carl.

== Personal life ==
Hightower and his wife, Susan, have three children. They lived in the suburbs around Pittsburgh during the September 11 attacks, after which they returned to Alabama.
