= Paul Bussman =

American politician

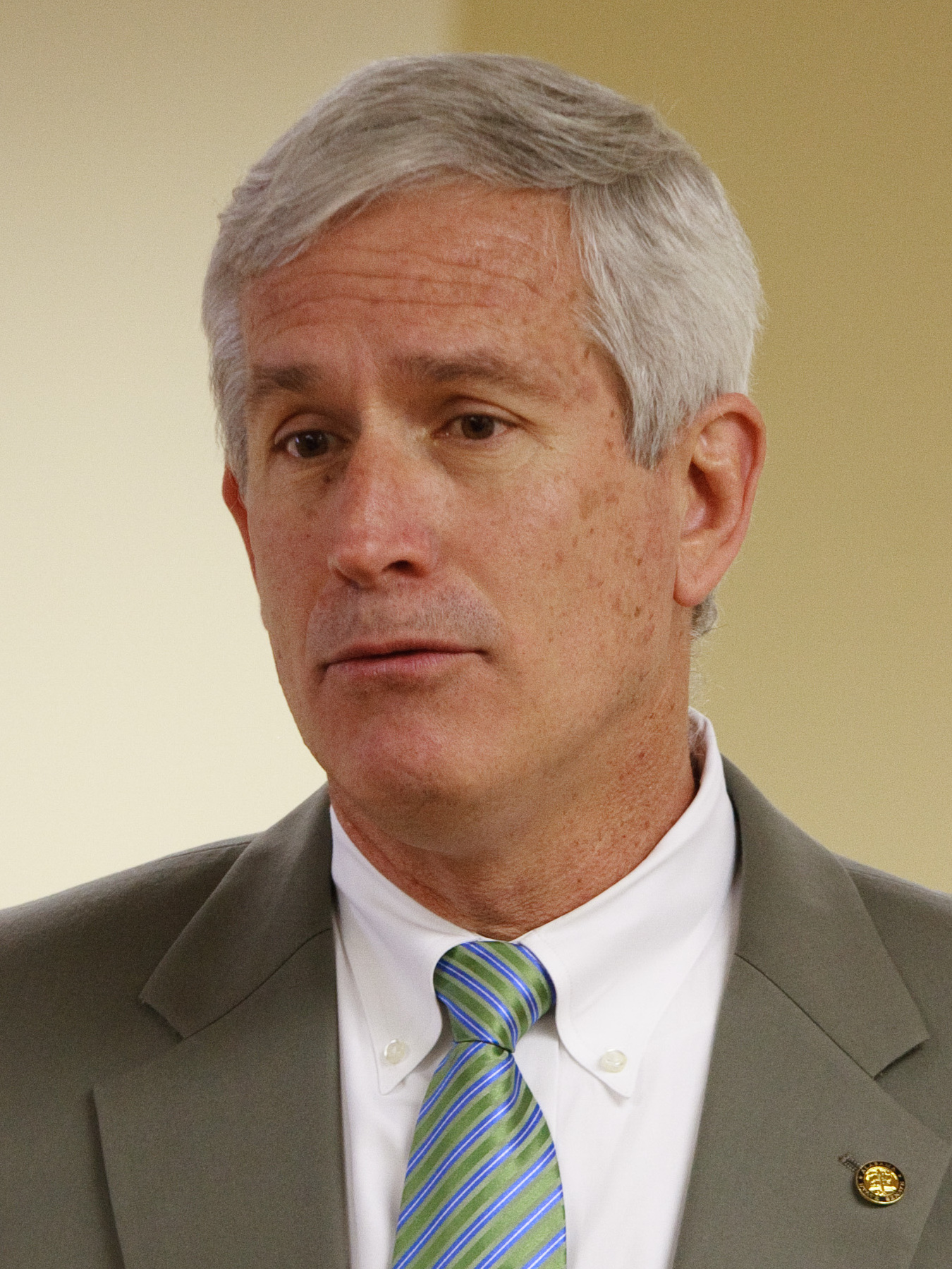
- Bussman at a press conference in 2012

Member of the Alabama Senate from the 4th district
- In office 2011–2018
- Preceded by: Zeb Little
- Succeeded by: Garlan Gudger

Personal details
- Born: December 7, 1956 (age 69) New Orleans, Louisiana, U.S.
- Party: Republican
- Spouse: Holly O'Connor Bussman
- Education: Troy State University (BA); University of Alabama (DMD)

Paul D. Bussman (born December 7, 1956) is an American dentist, businessman, and former politician who served as a member of the Alabama Senate for the 4th district from 2011 to 2018.

== Early life and education ==
Bussman was born in New Orleans, Louisiana and lived there until age three, when his family moved to Cullman, Alabama.

His mother moved Paul, his sister, and his three brothers back and forth several times before settling permanently in Cullman, where he graduated from Cullman High School in 1975. He then attended Troy State University where he was a four-year letterman in basketball and completed his Bachelor of Science degree in 1979. Later, he attended the UAB School of Dentistry, where he earned his Doctor of Dental Medicine degree in 1983.

== Career ==
After graduating from dental school, he returned to Cullman to practice dentistry. He also owns FUNZONE, a family entertainment center in Cullman.

== Career ==
On November 2, 2010, Bussman was elected to the 4th of the Alabama Senate, defeating incumbent Zeb Little. The district covers Cullman County, Lawrence and Winston Counties.

Bussman is active in the state and local chapters of both the American Dental Association and the Academy of General Dentistry. He has held five national appointments in the Academy of General Dentistry, was president and executive director of the Alabama office and serves as a spokesdentist for the Academy with national consumer media outlets.

Bussman was an organizer and past board member of the Good Samaritan Health Clinic- a free medical, optical and dental clinic for uninsured, employed individuals in Cullman County, and continues to provide free dental care to clients. He was the first president and organizer for the "Volunteers in Public Schools" program, a mentoring program for at-risk elementary children throughout the county. He was a past board member and volunteer of Habitat for Humanity and the Alabama Judicial Systems' Juvenile Conference Committee, a past chairman of the Chamber of Commerce, the Cullman Regional Medical Foundation, Cullman Kiwanis Club and the Leadership Cullman County Class of 2000. He once chaired and currently serves as a board member for the Cullman Savings Bank and the Cullman Savings Bank Foundation.

== Personal life ==
Bussman lives in Cullman with his wife Holly, their son Noah and their daughter Kendall. The Bussman family attends Daystar Church in Good Hope, Alabama.
