= Clay Scofield =

American politician

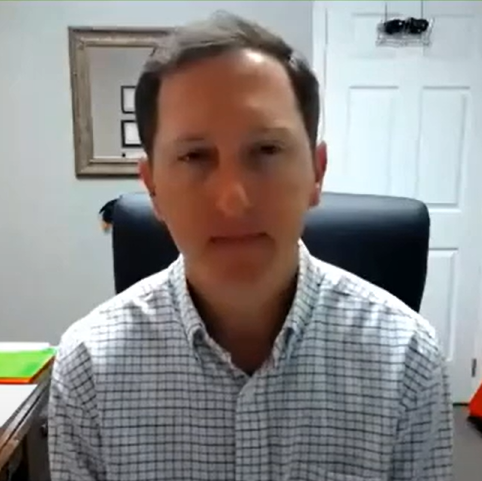

Majority Leader of the Alabama Senate
- In office February 2, 2021 – October 30, 2023
- Preceded by: Greg Reed
- Succeeded by: Steve Livingston

Member of the Alabama Senate from the 9th district
- In office November 3, 2010 – October 30, 2023
- Preceded by: Hinton Mitchem
- Succeeded by: Wes Kitchens

Personal details
- Born: May 6, 1980 (age 46) Cullman, Alabama, U.S.
- Party: Republican
- Education: Auburn University (BS)

Clay Scofield is an American politician. A Republican, he served as a member of the Alabama State Senate from the 9th District from 2010 to 2023.

In May 2019, he voted to make abortion a crime at any stage in a pregnancy, with no exemptions for cases of rape or incest. The bill had no penalty for the mother, just for the doctor.

Scofield resigned from the Alabama Senate in October 2023 to become the executive vice president of the Business Council of Alabama.

Alabama Senate
Preceded by Greg Reed	Majority Leader of the Alabama Senate; 2021–2023	Succeeded by Steve Livingston
