= Edward McClain (Alabama politician) =

American politician (1940–2020)

Edward 'E. B.' McClain

Member of the Alabama Senate from the 19th district
- In office 1995 - January 21, 2009
- Succeeded by: Priscilla Dunn

Personal details
- Born: April 29, 1940 Bessemer, Alabama, United States
- Died: November 9, 2020 (aged 80) Pleasant Grove, Alabama, United States
- Party: Democratic
- Spouse: Eloise
- Profession: Chemist

Edward Browning "E. B." McClain (April 29, 1940 – November 9, 2020) was an American politician. He served as a Democratic member of both the Alabama Senate (1995 through 2009) and the Alabama House of Representatives (1987 through 1994), before being convicted of felony charges related to his political service.

== Background ==
McClain was born in Bessemer, Alabama. He received his degree in chemistry from Miles College.

== Conviction ==
McClain vacated his senate seat on January 21, 2009, after being convicted in the U.S. District Court for the Northern District of Alabama on 48 counts of theft, money laundering, mail fraud, bribery, conspiracy, and political corruption. In conspiracy with Pastor Samuel L. Pettagrue, McClain stole over $150,000 of government grant money. He was sentenced to 70 months. While in prison on the federal charges, he was also found guilty on a related state charge, for which he was sentenced to one year to be served concurrently with the federal sentence.

== Death ==
McClain died on November 9, 2020, at his home in Pleasant Grove, Alabama.
