= Larry Dixon (politician) =

American politician (1942–2020)

Member of the Alabama Senate from the 25th district
- In office January 3, 1984 – January 4, 2011
- Preceded by: E. C. "Crum" Foshee
- Succeeded by: Dick Brewbaker

Member of the Alabama Senate from the 27th district
- In office January 3, 1983 – January 3, 1984
- Preceded by: Bishop N. Barron
- Succeeded by: T. D. Little

Member of the Alabama House of Representatives from the 81st district
- In office November 8, 1978 – November 3, 1982
- Preceded by: James D. Harris Jr.
- Succeeded by: Ham Wilson Jr.

Personal details
- Born: August 31, 1942 Nowata, Oklahoma, U.S.
- Died: December 4, 2020 (aged 78) Montgomery, Alabama, U.S.
- Party: Democratic (1978–1983); Republican (1983–2020)
- Spouse: Gaynell
- Profession: Executive Director, Alabama Board of Medical Examiners

Larry Dean Dixon (August 31, 1942 – December 4, 2020) was an American politician who was a Republican member of the Alabama Senate. He was a member of the Alabama House of Representatives from 1978 through 1982.

== Alabama Senate career ==
Dixon represented the 25th District from 1983 to 2010. He did not seek re-election in 2010 and retired from elective politics.

In 1982, as a Democrat in District 81, he defeated later District 73 Representative Perry O. Hooper Jr., of Montgomery. Just a few months after being sworn into the state senate, Dixon switched parties and became a Republican. Regardless of party affiliation, Dixon never had any trouble at the ballot box. His lowest margin was 74 percent in what would be his last bid for reelection, one of only four times that he even faced opposition during his four decades in the capital.

From 1981 until 2016, he was the chair of the Alabama Board of Medical Examiners. He also served as a member of the Intergovernmental Advisory council on Education during the Reagan Administration.

Dixon ran in the Republican primary for Alabama's 2nd congressional district in 1992 after longtime incumbent Bill Dickinson retired, and was initially the favorite for the nomination. However, he lost to newspaper publisher Terry Everett in what most considered an upset.

== Death ==
Dixon died from COVID-19 in Montgomery, Alabama, on December 4, 2020, at the age of 78, two weeks after an outdoor social gathering with others, at least two of whom had tested positive for the virus amidst the COVID-19 pandemic in Alabama.

His last words were a warning for people to take the virus seriously, saying: "We messed up. We let our guard down. Please tell everybody to be careful. This is real, and if you get diagnosed, get help immediately."

Alabama House of Representatives
Preceded by James D. Harris Jr.	Member of the Alabama House of Representatives from the 81st district 1978–1982	Succeeded by Ham Wilson Jr.
Alabama Senate
Preceded by Bishop N. Barron	Member of the Alabama Senate from the 27th district 1983–1984	Succeeded by T. D. Little
Preceded by E. C. "Crum" Foshee	Member of the Alabama Senate from the 25th district 1984–2011	Succeeded by Dick Brewbaker
