= Steve French (politician) =

American politician (born 1962)

Member of the Alabama Senate from the 15th district
- In office November 4, 1998 – November 3, 2010
- Preceded by: John Amari
- Succeeded by: Slade Blackwell

Personal details
- Born: May 22, 1962 (age 64) Lynchburg, Virginia, U.S.
- Party: Republican
- Spouse: Elizabeth
- Profession: Investment banker and insurance specialist, former political consultant

Steve French (born May 22, 1962) was a Republican member of the Alabama Senate, representing the 15th District from 1998 to 2010. He is now an insurance executive and a partner in a specialty lending company. In 2014 he ran for the U.S. House of Representatives, he earned a place in the run-off but withdrew before the primary run-off election.

French was the 6th Congressional District Chairman for the 2004 Bush/Cheney Presidential Campaign, the Alabama Organizational Chairman for the 2000 George W. Bush Presidential Campaign, the Alabama Campaign Manager for the 1992 Bush/Quayle Presidential Campaign, the Regional Political Director for the Republican National Committee from 1991 to 1992, and the executive director for the Alabama Republican Party from 1988 to 1991. In 1992, he founded a political consulting company, which he operated until his election to the State Senate in 1998.

During his time in the Alabama Senate, even though he was in the minority throughout his tenure, French was recognized for his investment and insurance knowledge. French was named to the Alabama Commission on Infrastructure, the SMART Governing Legislative Task Force, Legislative Oversight committee for State Pensions and a member of the Legislature's Permanent Joint Transportation Committee.
