= Hinton Mitchem =

American politician

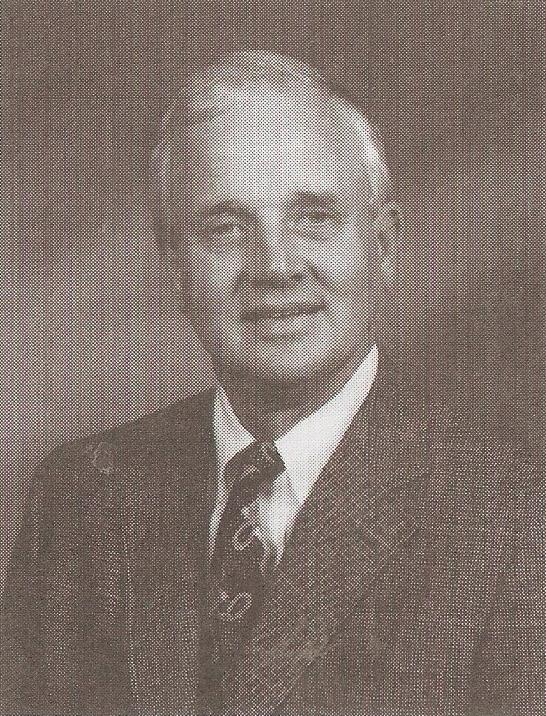

President pro tempore of the Alabama Senate
- In office January 9, 2007 – February 5, 2009
- Preceded by: Lowell Barron
- Succeeded by: Rodger Smitherman

Member of the Alabama Senate from the 9th district
- In office June 3, 1987 – November 3, 2010
- Preceded by: Loyd Coleman
- Succeeded by: Clay Scofield
- In office November 8, 1978 – November 5, 1986
- Preceded by: Sid McDonald
- Succeeded by: Loyd Coleman

Member of the Alabama House of Representatives from the 25th district
- In office November 6, 1974 – November 8, 1978
- Preceded by: Kirby Smith
- Succeeded by: Euclid Rains

Personal details
- Born: May 18, 1938 Oconee County, Georgia
- Died: January 22, 2013 (aged 74) Vinemont, Alabama
- Party: Democratic
- Spouses: Jill Tate (m. 1965–1994); Judy Corley Mabry (m. 1999–2013)
- Education: University of Georgia (BS)
- Profession: business owner

Military service
- Branch/service: United States Coast Guard

Hinton Mitchem (May 18, 1938 – January 22, 2013) was a Democratic member of the Alabama Senate, representing the 9th District from 1979 to January 1987 and then again from June 1987 to January 2011.

== Early years ==
Hinton Mitchem was born on May 18, 1938, in Georgia to Neal Emory and Gertrude Helen Hinton. He received his Bachelor of Science (B.S.) degree in Education from the University of Georgia in 1961. He also served in the U.S. Coast Guard. He moved from Georgia to Marshall County, Alabama, in 1962. He was the owner of Hinton Mitchem Tractor Co., Inc. from 1965 until he sold it in 2005.

== Political service ==
Mitchem first entered politics as a member of the Albertville, Alabama City Council in 1968. In 1974, he was elected unopposed in the general election as a member of the Alabama House of Representatives, representing the 25th District, serving a single four-year term before his election to the Senate. He ran without Republican opposition again in both his first race and in 1982 as well as the special 1983 race the entire legislature had to run in. In 1986, Mitchem stepped down from the Senate and ran in the primary for Lieutenant Governor. In a four-person field, he placed third behind fellow State Senator John Teague and eventual winner, Jim Folsom, Jr., placing just ahead of former State Treasurer Melba Till Allen.

When Senate successor Loyd Coleman was forced from office upon a criminal conviction in April 1987, Mitchem jumped into the special election and won handily in the primary, and by a 2-to-1 margin over Republican Nell Burton Skidmore. He won unopposed again in 1990. With the growing strength of the Alabama Republicans, he faced opposition during his last terms in 1994, 1998, 2002 and 2006, with a declining, but respectable, percentage of the vote. His closest race was his final one in 2006 where he prevailed by 7% over attorney Bill Ingram of Guntersville, Alabama.

Mitchem was elected President Pro Tempore of the Senate on January 9, 2007, by a margin of 18–17 over the efforts of a coalition of Republicans and disaffected Democrats to elect leadership that would be more favorable to then-Gov. Bob Riley. He then resigned from the position on February 5, 2009, per a prior agreement to allow a vote on Rodger Smitherman to succeed him for the remaining two years of the session. As of 2010, Mitchem was serving in his 36th year in the Alabama Legislature, then the longest-serving member (with a 5-month gap of service in early 1987). He chose to retire in 2010 and was succeeded by Republican Clay Scofield.

== Personal life ==
Mitchem was a Rotarian and enjoyed golf and traveling in his spare time. He had four children, Todd, Tonya, Dee and Brittnie, and five grandchildren.

== Later years ==
In 1980, Mitchem was appointed by then-Governor Fob James, Jr. as Chairman of the Alabama Governor's Commission on Physical Fitness, serving in that capacity for 28 years. He also served 18 consecutive years as Chairman of the Alabama Special Olympics.

He died on January 22, 2013. He had Alzheimer's disease. In addition to suffering with Alzheimer's disease for several years, in 2011 Mitchem was diagnosed with ALS, or Lou Gehrig's Disease, a fatal neuro-muscular disease with no known cause or cure.
