= Zeb Little =

American politician

Member of the Alabama Senate from the 4th district
- In office 1998–2010
- Succeeded by: Paul Bussman

Personal details
- Born: August 24, 1968 (age 58) Cullman, Alabama
- Party: Democratic
- Profession: Attorney

Zeb Little is a former Democratic politician from Alabama who served as a member of the Alabama Senate from District 4 from 1998 to 2010. He made history by becoming the youngest person to serve as the Majority Leader of the Alabama Senate, a role he held from 2002 to 2010. Little was also known for his leadership on various committees, including the Agriculture, Conservation, and Forestry Committee.

== Biography ==
Little was born in Cullman, Alabama, and attended Cullman High School. He received his bachelor's degree from the University of Alabama at Birmingham and his Juris Doctor degree from the Cumberland School of Law of Samford University. He is a member of the Alabama State Bar, the Cullman County Bar Association, and other bar associations.

Little served three terms as Alabama State Senator from district 4. During his first and second terms, he served as Chairperson of the Agriculture, Conservation, and Forestry Committee and Vice Chairperson of the Judiciary Committee. Halfway through his second term, he was elected as Senate Majority Leader to fill a vacancy.

He was again elected by his fellow Senators as Senate Majority Leader for the term 2007–2010. Senator Little was the youngest senator ever elected to serve as the Alabama Senate Majority Leader and also the youngest senator to ever chair an Alabama Senate standing committee.

In 2019, he was found guilty of taking money from client trust funds during his legal practice. Little admitted to misappropriating funds from personal injury settlements meant for clients' medical bills. His conviction included restitution payments of over $74,000.
