= Kim Benefield =

American politician

Kim S. Benefield

Member of the Alabama Senate from the 13th district
- In office 2006–2010

Personal details
- Born: Randolph County, Alabama
- Party: Democratic
- Spouse: Dennis

Kim S. Benefield was a Democratic member of the Alabama Senate, representing the 13th District from 2006 to 2010.
