= Phil Poole =

American politician (born 1959)

Member of the Alabama Senate from the 21st district
- In office November 9, 1994 – November 3, 2010
- Preceded by: Ryan deGraffenried Jr.
- Succeeded by: Gerald Allen

Personal details
- Born: March 3, 1959 (age 67) Tuscaloosa, Alabama
- Party: Democratic
- Spouse: Leigh Ann Chandler Poole
- Profession: Attorney

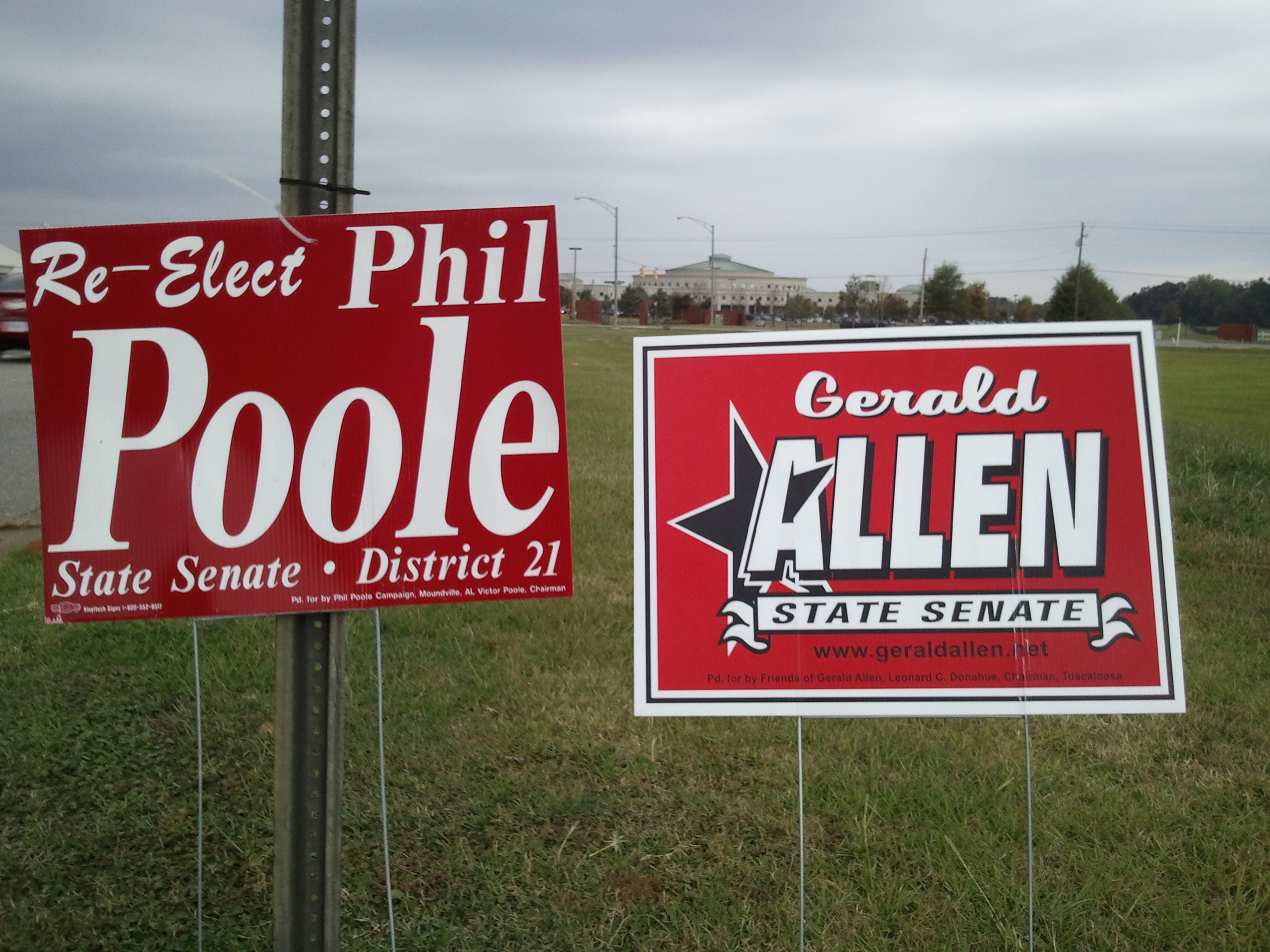
Re-Elect Phil Poole sign in Tuscaloosa, next to that of his competitor

Phil Poole (born March 3, 1959) is a former Democratic member of the Alabama Senate, representing the 21st District from 1994 to 2010. He was defeated for re-election in 2010 by Republican Gerald Allen. Previously he was a member of the Alabama House of Representatives from 1982 through 1994. Poole is married to Dr. Leigh Ann Chandler Poole. He is a Democrat, serving his fourth term in the Alabama State Senate (1994–2010) after serving four terms in the Alabama State House of Representatives (1982–1994).

Poole served as the vice chairperson for children, youth affairs and human resources; the deputy chairperson for finance and taxation, education; and was the chairperson for veterans and military affairs.

Poole was born in Tuscaloosa, Alabama. He received his high school degree from Hale County High School in 1977 (Valedictorian, Senior Class President, Captain of the football team). He received his undergraduate degree from the University of Alabama in 1980 (SGA Senator and Outstanding Pre-Law Student in the School of Commerce and Business Administration; and his Juris Doctor degree in December 1982 from the University of Alabama School of Law. Poole took and passed the Alabama State Bar exam in February 1983 and was admitted to the bar in May 1983.

Poole served in the ROTC at the University of Alabama, was commissioned as a Second Lieutenant in the Alabama National Guard (1982) and served in the Alabama National Guard and Army Reserve - IRR and received an honorable discharge in 1996 as a Captain.

Poole is a member of Moundville United Methodist Church, the Moundville Masonic Lodge, Tuscaloosa County Bar Association, Tuscaloosa County Park and Recreation Authority District III Advisory Committee, West Alabama Chamber of Commerce, and VOCAL. He served several years on the Board of Directors of United Cerebral Palsy of West Alabama, is a member of the National Rifle Association (A+ rating), and is an Eagle Scout.

Poole is credited with developing the plan to save Bryce Hospital and has obtained the funds to bridge the gap between the University of Alabama bid price and the Department of Mental Health asking price. Senator Poole has brought hundreds of millions of dollars in road projects to West Alabama, including: Hwy 43 five-lane between Northport and Tuscaloosa County High School; the Western Bypass from Tuscaloosa County High School to Hwy 82 junction with the toll road; Hwy 82 West four-lane between Buhl and the Pickens County line, and between Reform and Ethelsville; Interstate 20/59 six-lane expansion between Tuscaloosa and Jefferson County; the four-lane from Interstate 20/59 to the Brookwood Middle School; the Hwy 69 four-lane from Taylorville to Moundville; and the Eastern Bridge. Poole was instrumental in getting Paul Bryant Jr. on the University of Alabama Board of Trustees.

He is a law partner with Cross, Poole, and Smith, LLC.
