= Ben Brooks (politician) =

American politician

Member of the Alabama Senate from the 35th district
- In office November 8, 2006 – December 4, 2012
- Preceded by: Gary Tanner
- Succeeded by: Bill Hightower

Personal details
- Born: August 11, 1958 (age 68) Mobile, Alabama, U.S.
- Party: Republican
- Spouse: Kathy
- Education: University of South Alabama; University of Alabama
- Profession: attorney

Ben Brooks (born August 11, 1958) is a Republican former member of the Alabama Senate in the US, representing the 35th District and from November 2006 to December 2012. He stepped down after being elected a circuit court judge for Mobile County in November 2012 and before being sworn in January 2013.
