= T. D. Little =

American politician

T. D. "Ted" Little

Member of the Alabama Senate
- In office November 6, 1990 – November 2, 2010
- Preceded by: John Rice
- Succeeded by: Tom Whatley
- Constituency: 27th district
- In office November 5, 1974 – November 4, 1986
- Preceded by: Tom Jones & J. J. Pierce
- Succeeded by: John Rice
- Constituency: 21st district (1974–1983); 27th district (1983–1986)

Personal details
- Born: June 21, 1942 (age 84) Andalusia, Alabama
- Party: Democratic Party
- Spouse: Widower
- Parent(s): Grover & Hester Little of Andalusia, AL
- Profession: Attorney at law

T. D. "Ted" Little (born June 21, 1942) is a former member of the Alabama Senate, representing the 21st District from 1974 to 1983 and the 27th District from 1983 to 1986, and again from 1990 to 2010. He served a total of 32 years in the Alabama Senate. He ran for the U. S. Congress in Alabama's 3rd Congressional District in 1996, being the Democratic nominee, but lost to Bob Riley in the general election. Little later lost his seat in the state senate after he was defeated by Republican challenger Tom Whatley in the general election on November 2, 2010.
