= 2010 Alabama Senate election =

2010 Alabama Senate elections
- November 2, 2010

All 35 seats in the Alabama Senate 18 seats needed for a majority

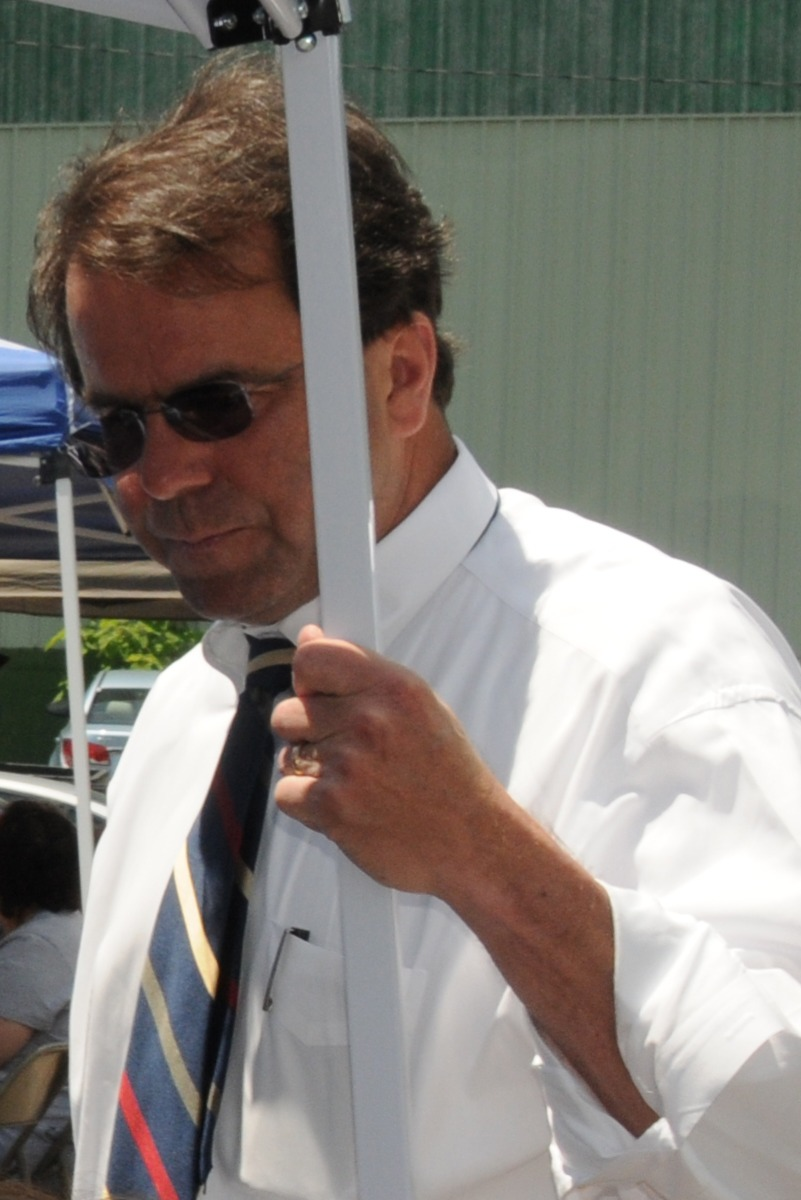
	Majority party	Minority party
Leader	Del Marsh	Roger Bedford Jr.
Party	Republican	Democratic
Leader's seat	12th-Anniston	6th-Russellville
Seats before	14+1	20
Seats after	22+1	12
Seat change	▲8	▼8
Popular vote	788,738	565,026
Percentage	56.9%	40.8%
- Results: Republican gain Democratic gain Republican hold Democratic hold Independent hold
President pro tempore before election
Rodger Smitherman
Democratic
Elected President pro tempore
Del Marsh
Republican

The 2010 Alabama Senate election was held on November 2, 2010. Voters in all 35 districts of the Alabama State Senate voted for their representatives. Other elections were also held on November 2. Republicans gained 9 seats, taking control of the chamber, while the Democrats lost 10 seats. This was the first time since 1873 that the Republican Party held a majority of seats in the Alabama Senate.

The Republican Party of Alabama barred Harri Anne Smith from running for reelection to her state senate seat as a Republican in 2010, as she violated a state party bylaw that bars an elected Republican from endorsing a candidate from another party when a Republican is running. However, in June 2010, she garnered enough signatures in her district to run as an independent. She won re-election to a fourth term and caucused with the Republicans.

== Overview ==
Summary of the November 2, 2010 Alabama Senate election results
2010 Alabama Senate elections
Party	Votes	Percentage	Before	After	+/–
Republican	788,738	56.9%	14	22	▲8
Democratic	565,026	40.8%	20	12	▼8
Independent	23,800	1.7%	1	1	Steady
Write-In	7,532	0.5%	0	0	Steady
Totals	1,385,096	100.0%	35	35	—

== Predictions ==
Source	Ranking	As of
Governing	Lean R (flip)	November 1, 2010

== Results ==
=== District 1 ===
Alabama's 1st Senate district election, 2010
Party	Candidate	Votes	%
Democratic	Tammy Irons	23,178	55.9
Republican	Jerry Freeman	18,266	44.1
Independent	Write-In	20	0.0
Total votes		41,464	100.0
Democratic hold			

=== District 2 ===
Alabama's 2nd Senate district election, 2010
Party	Candidate	Votes	%
Republican	Bill Holtzclaw	33,050	58.9
Democratic	Tom Butler (incumbent)	23,060	41.1
Independent	Write-In	20	0.0
Total votes		56,145	100.0
Republican gain from Democratic			

=== District 3 ===
Alabama's 3rd Senate district election, 2010
Party	Candidate	Votes	%
Republican	Arthur Orr (incumbent)	39,245	98.9
Independent	Write-In	429	1.1
Total votes		39,674	100.0
Republican hold			

=== District 4 ===
Alabama's 4th Senate district election, 2010
Party	Candidate	Votes	%
Republican	Paul Bussman	25,621	57.7
Democratic	Zeb Little (incumbent)	18,733	42.2
Independent	Write-In	83	0.2
Total votes		44,437	100.0
Republican gain from Democratic			

=== District 5 ===
Alabama's 5th Senate district election, 2010
Party	Candidate	Votes	%
Republican	Greg Reed (incumbent)	33,500	73.2
Democratic	Brett Wadsworth	12,213	26.7
Independent	Write-In	33	0.1
Total votes		45,746	100.0
Republican hold			

=== District 6 ===
Alabama's 6th Senate district election, 2010
Party	Candidate	Votes	%
Democratic	Roger Bedford Jr. (incumbent)	18,692	53.4
Republican	Jim Bonner	16,304	46.5
Independent	Write-In	27	0.1
Total votes		35,023	100.0
Democratic hold			

=== District 7 ===
Alabama's 7th Senate district election, 2010
Party	Candidate	Votes	%
Republican	Paul Sanford (incumbent)	25,333	54.9
Democratic	Jeff Enfinger	20,819	45.1
Independent	Write-In	28	0.1
Total votes		46,180	100.0
Republican hold			

=== District 8 ===
Alabama's 8th Senate district election, 2010
Party	Candidate	Votes	%
Republican	Shadrack McGill	20,603	50.5
Democratic	Lowell Barron (incumbent)	20,016	49.1
Independent	Write-In	177	0.4
Total votes		40,796	100.0
Republican gain from Democratic			

=== District 9 ===
Alabama's 9th Senate district election, 2010
Party	Candidate	Votes	%
Republican	Clay Scofield	30,834	68.8
Democratic	Tim Mitchell	13,933	31.1
Independent	Write-In	47	0.1
Total votes		44,814	100.0
Republican gain from Democratic			

=== District 10 ===
Alabama's 10th Senate district election, 2010
Party	Candidate	Votes	%
Republican	Phil Williams	20,249	53.6
Democratic	Larry Means (incumbent)	17,459	46.2
Independent	Write-In	51	0.1
Total votes		37,759	100.0
Republican gain from Democratic			

=== District 11 ===
Alabama's 11th Senate district election, 2010
Party	Candidate	Votes	%
Democratic	Jerry L. Fielding	19,929	53.4
Republican	Ray Robbins	17,323	46.4
Independent	Write-In	56	0.2
Total votes		37,308	100.0
Democratic hold			

The incumbent senator, Jim Preuitt, joined the Republican Party in April 2010.

=== District 12 ===
Alabama's 12th Senate district election, 2010
Party	Candidate	Votes	%
Republican	Del Marsh (incumbent)	26,714	63.7
Democratic	Wallace Wyatt, Jr.	15,210	36.2
Independent	Write-In	42	0.1
Total votes		41,966	100.0
Republican hold			

=== District 13 ===
Alabama's 13th Senate district election, 2010
Party	Candidate	Votes	%
Republican	Gerald Dial	18,800	50.4
Democratic	Greg Varner	18,443	49.5
Independent	Write-In	50	0.1
Total votes		37,293	100.0
Republican gain from Democratic			

=== District 14 ===
Alabama's 14th Senate district election, 2010
Party	Candidate	Votes	%
Republican	Cam Ward	42,511	98.9
Independent	Write-In	460	1.1
Total votes		42,971	100.0
Republican hold			

=== District 15 ===
Alabama's 15th Senate district election, 2010
Party	Candidate	Votes	%
Republican	Slade Blackwell	46,018	98.8
Independent	Write-In	557	1.2
Total votes		46,575	100.0
Republican hold			

=== District 16 ===
Alabama's 16th Senate district election, 2010
Party	Candidate	Votes	%
Republican	J.T. "Jabo" Waggoner	43,604	98.5
Independent	Write-In	676	1.5
Total votes		44,280	100.0
Republican hold			

=== District 17 ===
Alabama's 17th Senate district election, 2010
Party	Candidate	Votes	%
Republican	Scott Beason (incumbent)	38,777	81.1
Democratic	T. E. "Tommy" Hudson	8,973	18.8
Independent	Write-In	55	0.1
Total votes		47,805	100.0
Republican hold			

=== District 18 ===
Alabama's 18th Senate district election, 2010
Party	Candidate	Votes	%
Democratic	Rodger M. Smitherman (incumbent)	25,154	98.3
Independent	Write-In	431	1.7
Total votes		25,585	100.0
Democratic hold			

=== District 19 ===
Alabama's 19th Senate district election, 2010
Party	Candidate	Votes	%
Democratic	Priscilla Dunn	29,227	98.9
Independent	Write-In	324	1.1
Total votes		29,551	100.0
Democratic hold			

=== District 20 ===
Alabama's 20th Senate district election, 2010
Party	Candidate	Votes	%
Democratic	Linda Coleman (incumbent)	28,282	99.1
Independent	Write-In	263	0.9
Total votes		28,545	100.0
Democratic hold			

=== District 21 ===
Alabama's 21st Senate district election, 2010
Party	Candidate	Votes	%
Republican	Gerald Allen	20,528	51.2
Democratic	Phil Poole (incumbent)	19,509	48.7
Independent	Write-In	55	0.1
Total votes		40,092	100.0
Republican gain from Democratic			

=== District 22 ===
Alabama's 22nd Senate district election, 2010
Party	Candidate	Votes	%
Democratic	Marc Keahey	24,785	55.4
Republican	Danny B. Joyner	19,939	44.6
Independent	Write-In	31	0.1
Total votes		44,755	100.0
Democratic hold			

=== District 23 ===
Alabama's 23rd Senate district election, 2010
Party	Candidate	Votes	%
Democratic	Hank Sanders (incumbent)	30,322	97.7
Independent	Write-In	724	2.3
Total votes		31,046	100.0
Democratic hold			

=== District 24 ===
Alabama's 24th Senate district election, 2010
Party	Candidate	Votes	%
Democratic	Bobby Singleton (incumbent)	30,803	98.3
Independent	Write-In	521	1.7
Total votes		31,324	100.0
Democratic hold			

=== District 25 ===
Alabama's 25th Senate district election, 2010
Party	Candidate	Votes	%
Republican	Dick Brewbaker	38,919	72.9
Democratic	Doug "Smitty" Smith	14,425	27.0
Independent	Write-In	50	0.1
Total votes		53,394	100.0
Republican hold			

=== District 26 ===
Alabama's 26th Senate district election, 2010
Party	Candidate	Votes	%
Democratic	Quinton T. Ross, Jr. (incumbent)	28,703	97.9
Independent	Write-In	615	2.1
Total votes		29,318	100.0
Democratic hold			

=== District 27 ===
Alabama's 27th Senate district election, 2010
Party	Candidate	Votes	%
Republican	Tom Whatley	21,245	54.9
Democratic	T.D. (Ted) Little (incumbent)	17,379	44.9
Independent	Write-In	77	0.2
Total votes		38,701	100.0
Republican gain from Democratic			

=== District 28 ===
Alabama's 28th Senate district election, 2010
Party	Candidate	Votes	%
Democratic	Billy Beasley	28,619	70.4
Republican	Kim West	12,033	29.6
Independent	Write-In	27	0.1
Total votes		40,679	100.0
Democratic hold			

=== District 29 ===
Alabama's 29th Senate district election, 2010
Party	Candidate	Votes	%
Independent	Harri Anne Smith (incumbent)	23,800	55.2
Republican	George Flowers	19,225	44.6
Independent	Write-In	84	0.2
Total votes		43,109	100.0
Independent hold			

=== District 30 ===
Alabama's 30th Senate district election, 2010
Party	Candidate	Votes	%
Republican	Bryan Taylor	25,868	57.0
Democratic	"Walking" Wendell Mitchell (incumbent)	19,506	43.0
Independent	Write-In	33	0.1
Total votes		45,407	100.0
Republican gain from Democratic			

=== District 31 ===
Alabama's 31st Senate district election, 2010
Party	Candidate	Votes	%
Republican	Jimmy W. Holley (incumbent)	29,301	98.2
Independent	Write-In	536	1.8
Total votes		29,837	100.0
Republican hold			

=== District 32 ===
Alabama's 32nd Senate district election, 2010
Party	Candidate	Votes	%
Republican	Trip Pittman	42,365	98.8
Independent	Write-In	497	1.2
Total votes		42,862	100.0
Republican hold			

=== District 33 ===
Alabama's 33rd Senate district election, 2010
Party	Candidate	Votes	%
Democratic	Vivian Davis Figures (incumbent)	23,241	73.3
Republican	Brad Moser	8,419	26.6
Independent	Write-In	32	0.1
Total votes		31,692	100.0
Democratic hold			

=== District 34 ===
Alabama's 34th Senate district election, 2010
Party	Candidate	Votes	%
Republican	Rusty Glover (incumbent)	34,325	98.8
Independent	Write-In	391	1.1
Total votes		34,716	100.0
Republican hold			

=== District 35 ===
Alabama's 35th Senate district election, 2010
Party	Candidate	Votes	%
Republican	Ben Brooks (incumbent)	18,307	59.1
Democratic	Scott A. Buzbee	12,653	40.9
Independent	Write-In	11	0.0
Total votes		30,971	100.0
Republican hold			

== See also ==
- List of Alabama state legislatures
