= 2014 Alabama Senate election =

2014 Alabama Senate elections
- November 4, 2014

All 35 seats in the Alabama Senate 18 seats needed for a majority

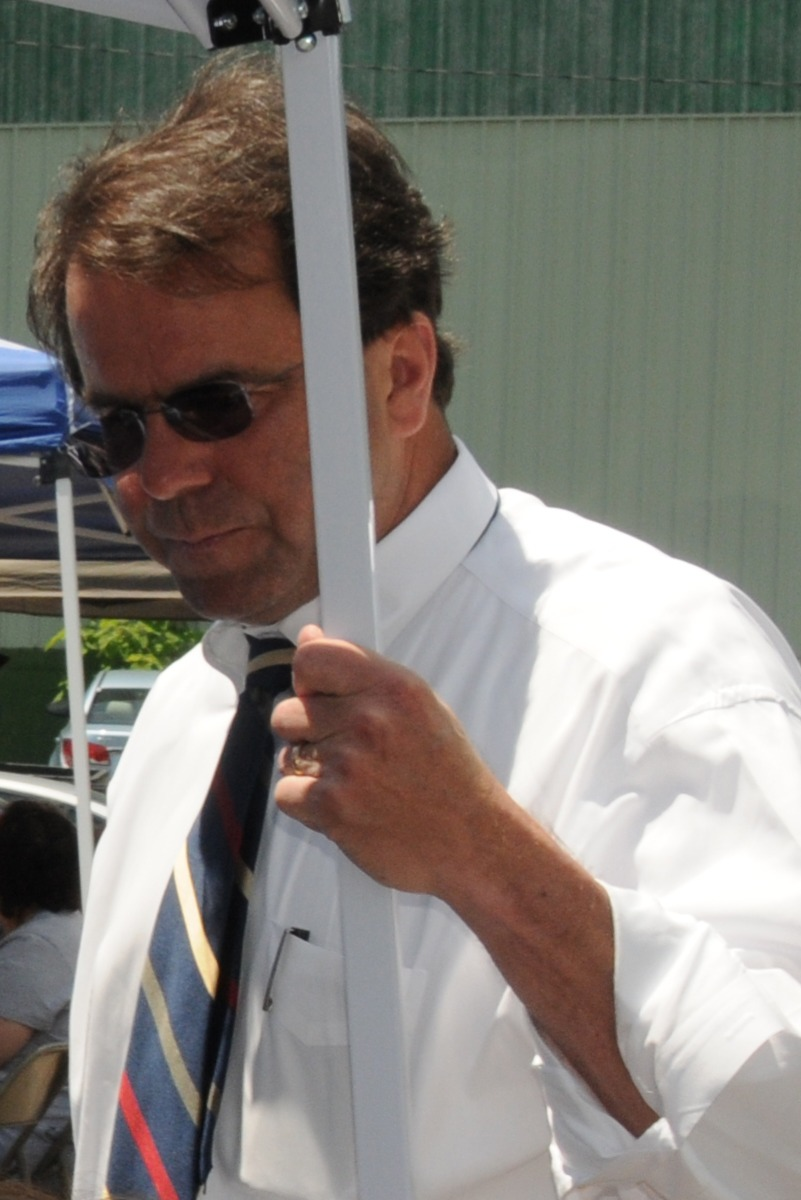
	Majority party	Minority party
Leader	Del Marsh	Roger Bedford Jr. (lost re-election)
Party	Republican	Democratic
Leader's seat	12th	6th
Last election	22+1	12
Seats before	23+1	11
Seats after	26+1	8
Seat change	▲3	▼3
Popular vote	642,053	366,756
Percentage	61.15%	34.93%
- Results: Republican gain Republican hold Democratic hold Independent hold

The 2014 Alabama Senate elections took place on November 4, 2014, as part of the 2014 United States elections. Alabama voters elected senators in all 35 of the state's Senate districts. Senators serve four-year terms in the Alabama Senate.

== Overview ==
Before the election, Republicans already held 23+1–11 majority over the Democrats. After the election, Republicans obtained a supermajority with a margin of 26+1–8.

Summary of the November 4, 2014 Alabama Senate election results
2014 Alabama Senate elections
Party	Votes	Percentage	Before	After	+/–
Republican	642,053	61.15%	23	26	▲3
Democratic	366,756	34.93%	11	8	▼3
Independent	33,486	3.19%	1	1	Steady
Write-In	7,691	0.73%	0	0	Steady
Totals	1,049,986	100.0%	35	35	—

== Predictions ==
Source	Ranking	As of
Governing	Safe R	October 20, 2014

== Results ==
Alabama's 1st Senate district election, 2014
Party	Candidate	Votes	%
Republican	Tim Melson	22,982	62.6
Democratic	Mike Curtis	13,704	37.3
Independent	Write-in	25	0.1
Total votes		36,711	100.0

Alabama's 2nd Senate district election, 2014
Party	Candidate	Votes	%
Republican	Bill Holtzclaw	24,936	96.3
Independent	Write-in	968	3.7
Total votes		25,904	100.0

Alabama's 3rd Senate district election, 2014
Party	Candidate	Votes	%
Republican	Arthur Orr (incumbent)	26,906	98.5
Independent	Write-In	412	1.5
Total votes		27,318	100.0

Alabama's 4th Senate district election, 2014
Party	Candidate	Votes	%
Republican	Paul Bussman	24,750	73.5
Democratic	Angelo Mancuso	8,875	26.4
Independent	Write-in	29	0.1
Total votes		33,654	100.0

Alabama's 5th Senate district election, 2014
Party	Candidate	Votes	%
Republican	Greg Reed	29,611	98.7
Independent	Write-in	399	1.3
Total votes		30,010	100.0

Alabama's 6th Senate district election, 2014
Party	Candidate	Votes	%
Republican	Larry Stutts	17,641	50.1
Democratic	Roger Bedford, Jr.	17,574	49.9
Independent	Write-in	27	0.1
Total votes		35,242	100.0

Alabama's 7th Senate district election, 2014
Party	Candidate	Votes	%
Republican	Paul Sanford	22,873	64.8
Democratic	Bryan Bennet	12,404	35.1
Independent	Write-in	35	0.1
Total votes		35,312	100.0

Alabama's 8th Senate district election, 2014
Party	Candidate	Votes	%
Republican	Steve Livingston	24,332	72.2
Democratic	Horace Clemmons	9,322	27.6
Independent	Write-in	64	0.2
Total votes		33,718	100.0

Alabama's 9th Senate district election, 2014
Party	Candidate	Votes	%
Republican	Clay Scofield	24,596	98.5
Independent	Write-in	367	1.5
Total votes		24,963	100.0

Alabama's 10th Senate district election, 2014
Party	Candidate	Votes	%
Republican	Phil Williams	17,967	52
Democratic	Larry Means	16,530	47.9
Independent	Write-in	45	0.1
Total votes		34,542	100.0

Alabama's 11th Senate district election, 2014
Party	Candidate	Votes	%
Republican	Jim McClendon	24,318	77.6
Democratic	Ron Crumpton	6,981	22.3
Independent	Write-in	31	0.1
Total votes		31,330	100.0

Alabama's 12th Senate district election, 2014
Party	Candidate	Votes	%
Republican	Del Marsh	17,646	57.1
Democratic	Taylor Stewart	13,178	42.6
Independent	Write-in	85	0.3
Total votes		30,909	100.0

Alabama's 13th Senate district election, 2014
Party	Candidate	Votes	%
Republican	Gerald Dial	16,758	54.2
Democratic	Darrell Truner	H3	33.7
Independent	Bill Fuller	3,697	12
Independent	Write-in	43	0.1
Total votes		30,922	100.0

Alabama's 14th Senate district election, 2014
Party	Candidate	Votes	%
Republican	Cam Ward	25,724	98.4
Independent	Write-in	415	1.6
Total votes		26,139	100.0

Alabama's 15th Senate district election, 2014
Party	Candidate	Votes	%
Republican	Slade Blackwell	29,498	98.4
Independent	Write-in	466	1.6
Total votes		29,964	100.0

Alabama's 16th Senate district election, 2014
Party	Candidate	Votes	%
Republican	J.T. "Jabo" Waggoner	28,107	77.1
Democratic	Cindy Bell	8,284	22.7
Independent	Write-in	42	0.1
Total votes		36,433	100.0

Alabama's 17th Senate district election, 2014
Party	Candidate	Votes	%
Republican	Shay Shelnutt	31,105	98.8
Independent	Write-in	363	1.2
Total votes		31,468	100.0

Alabama's 18th Senate district election, 2014
Party	Candidate	Votes	%
Democratic	Rodger Smitherman	23,195	98.2
Independent	Write-in	421	1.8
Total votes		23,616	100.0

Alabama's 19th Senate district election, 2014
Party	Candidate	Votes	%
Democratic	Priscilla Dunn	27,143	98.7
Independent	Write-in	349	1.3
Total votes		27,492	100.0

Alabama's 20th Senate district election, 2014
Party	Candidate	Votes	%
Democratic	Linda Coleman	23,368	98.5
Independent	Write-in	350	1.5
Total votes		23,718	100.0

Alabama's 21st Senate district election, 2014
Party	Candidate	Votes	%
Republican	Gerald Allen	20,179	62.3
Democratic	Phil Poole	12,161	37.5
Independent	Write-in	48	0.1
Total votes		32,388	100.0

Alabama's 22nd Senate district election, 2014
Party	Candidate	Votes	%
Republican	Greg Albritton	23,162	67.2
Democratic	Susan Smith	11,275	32.7
Independent	Write-in	29	0.1
Total votes		34,466	100.0

Alabama's 23rd Senate district election, 2014
Party	Candidate	Votes	%
Democratic	Hank Sanders	29,306	97.6
Independent	Write-in	719	2.4
Total votes		30,025	100.0

Alabama's 24th Senate district election, 2014
Party	Candidate	Votes	%
Democratic	Bobby Singleton	26,859	98.9
Independent	Write-in	301	1.1
Total votes		27,160	100.0

Alabama's 25th Senate district election, 2014
Party	Candidate	Votes	%
Republican	Dick Brewbaker	29,545	98.2
Independent	Write-in	551	1.8
Total votes		30,096	100.0

Alabama's 26th Senate district election, 2014
Party	Candidate	Votes	%
Democratic	Quinton Ross	25,166	99.2
Independent	Write-in	209	0.8
Total votes		25,375	100.0

Alabama's 27th Senate district election, 2014
Party	Candidate	Votes	%
Republican	Tom Whatley	19,808	65.5
Democratic	Haylee Moss	10,358	34.3
Independent	Write-in	56	0.2
Total votes		30,222	100.0

Alabama's 28th Senate district election, 2014
Party	Candidate	Votes	%
Democratic	Billy Beasley	22,148	73.3
Republican	John Savage	8,020	26.5
Independent	Write-in	44	0.1
Total votes		30,212	100.0

Alabama's 29th Senate district election, 2014
Party	Candidate	Votes	%
Independent	Harri Anne Smith	17,830	52.4
Republican	Melinda McClendon	16,145	47.4
Independent	Write-in	63	0.2
Total votes		34,038	100.0

Alabama's 30th Senate district election, 2014
Party	Candidate	Votes	%
Republican	Clyde Chambliss	22,916	79.9
Independent	Bryan Morgan	5,653	19.7
Independent	Write-in	97	0.3
Total votes		28,666	100.0

Alabama's 31st Senate district election, 2014
Party	Candidate	Votes	%
Republican	Jimmy Holley	23,067	72.7
Democratic	Larry Greenwood	8,627	27.2
Independent	Write-in	43	0.1
Total votes		31,737	100.0

Alabama's 32nd Senate district election, 2014
Party	Candidate	Votes	%
Republican	Trip Pittman	27,837	81.4
Independent	Kimberly McCuiston	6,306	18.4
Independent	Write-in	55	0.2
Total votes		34,198	100.0

Alabama's 33rd Senate district election, 2014
Party	Candidate	Votes	%
Democratic	Vivian Davis Figures	23,012	98.9
Independent	Write-in	261	1.1
Total votes		23,273	100.0

Alabama's 34th Senate district election, 2014
Party	Candidate	Votes	%
Republican	Rusty Glover	22,451	98.8
Independent	Write-in	263	1.2
Total votes		22,714	100.0

Alabama's 35th Senate district election, 2014
Party	Candidate	Votes	%
Republican	Bill Hightower	19,173	73.6
Democratic	Beau Doolittle	6,862	26.3
Independent	Write-in	16	0.1
Total votes		26,051	100.0

== See also ==
- List of Alabama state legislatures
