= Human Life Protection Act =

Alabama state abortion law

Alabama State Legislature
- Long title: Abortion, make abortion a Class A felony and attempted abortion a Class C felony
- Territorial extent: Alabama
- Signed by: Governor Kay Ivey
- Signed: May 15, 2019

Legislative history
- Introduced by: Terri Collins
- First reading: April 30, 2019 (House of Representatives)
- Second reading: May 14, 2019 (Senate)
- Status: Current legislation

The Human Life Protection Act, also known as House Bill 314 (HB 314) and the Alabama abortion ban, is an Alabama statute enacted on May 15, 2019, that imposes a near-total ban on abortion in the state. Originally set to go into effect in November 2019, a legal challenge against the bill delayed implementation until 2022. The bill was passed in both chambers of the Alabama Legislature in a party-line vote and signed by Republican governor Kay Ivey. Under the Human Life Protection Act, a doctor who performs a banned abortion in the state of Alabama is guilty of a Class A felony, and could be sentenced to life imprisonment. Several proposed amendments that would have allowed abortions in cases of rape and incest were rejected.

From its introduction to its signing, the Human Life Protection Act has been strongly opposed by Democratic politicians and activists; it has also been criticized by a number of Republican politicians. Legal challenges to the act were quickly brought by abortion rights advocates; a preliminary injunction against the law was issued by U.S. District Court for the Middle District of Alabama judge Myron Herbert Thompson in October 2019. On June 24, 2022, after the U.S. Supreme Court overturned Roe v. Wade in Dobbs v. Jackson Women's Health Organization, Judge Thompson lifted the injunction, allowing the law to go into effect.

== Legislative history ==
The bill was introduced in the Alabama House of Representatives on April 2, 2019, by Terri Collins, a Republican representing Decatur. In the Alabama Senate, Republican Clyde Chambliss sponsored Collins' legislation. Eric Johnson, the president of the Alabama Pro-Life Coalition, wrote the Human Life Protection Act.

=== Provisions ===
The Human Life Protection Act bans abortions at any stage of a pregnancy. The law provides for exceptions in cases where a fetus has a lethal anomaly (a medical condition that would cause the fetus to be stillborn or to die shortly following birth), or in cases where a pregnancy would "present serious health risk" to the woman. The law does not ban procedures to end ectopic pregnancies. It does not include an exception in cases of rape or incest.

The Human Life Protection Act classifies the performance of an illegal abortion as a Class A felony equivalent to rape and murder. Doctors found guilty under its provisions could receive sentences ranging from 10 years imprisonment to 99 years or life imprisonment. An attempt at performing an illegal abortion is classified by the bill as a Class C felony. The bill also states that women receiving abortions would not be held criminally or civilly liable.

A provision in the bill compared abortion to historical genocide events, reading: "More than 50 million babies have been aborted in the United States since the Roe decision in 1973, more than three times the number who were killed in German death camps, Chinese purges, Stalin's gulags, Cambodian killing fields, and the Rwandan genocide combined".

=== Debate ===
Anthony Daniels, the Democratic minority leader of the House of Representatives, proposed an amendment to the bill that would allow abortions in cases of rape and incest, but it was rejected by a vote of 72–26. Collins opposed the amendment, and stated: "My goal with this bill is to let the Supreme Court possibly revisit [the Roe v. Wade] decision on just the issue that they made that decision, which was, is that baby in the womb a person." Democratic representative Merika Coleman said: "I do support life, but there are some people that just support birth, they don't support life, because after a child is born, there are some things that need to happen. We need to make sure that child has adequate health care."

A day after the bill's passage in the House of Representatives, Democratic representative John Rogers endorsed a woman's choice to choose, but then stated: "Some kids are unwanted, so you kill them now or kill them later. You bring them into the world unwanted, unloved, then you send them to the electric chair. So, you kill them now, or you kill them later. But the bottom line is that I think we shouldn't be making this decision."

An amendment that would have allowed abortions for rape and incest victims failed in the Senate by a vote of 21–11. After the amendment's rejection, Democratic minority leader Bobby Singleton said: "You just aborted and you raped the state of Alabama. All of you should be put in jail for this abortion that you just laid on the state of Alabama. This is just a shame. This is a disgrace. It is a travesty." The minority leader sought to filibuster the legislation, but the Senate voted to end debate after four and a half hours of argumentation.

In the Senate debate, Chambliss argued that under the bill, a woman who was pregnant due to rape or incest still could legally get an abortion "until she knows she's pregnant"; he had previously claimed that "there's some period of time before you can know a woman is pregnant". During the debate, Vivian Davis Figures asked Chambliss if he knew "what it's like to" suffer rape or incest, to which he answered that he didn't in both cases. Figures proposed an amendment that would make men who have vasectomies guilty of a Class A felony, and those who attempt to have a vasectomy guilty of a Class C felony. On the Senate floor, Linda Coleman-Madison said: "This bill is about control."

=== Vote and enactment ===
On April 30, 2019, the bill was passed by the House of Representatives along a party-line vote of 74–3. Most of the Democrats in the House of Representatives walked out of debate on the bill and subsequently did not vote. In the Alabama Senate, Republican Clyde Chambliss sponsored Collins' legislation. On May 14, 2019, the bill was passed by the Senate by a vote of 25–6, also along party lines.

On May 15, 2019, the day after the bill was passed by the Senate, Governor Kay Ivey signed it into law. The bill was set to enter into effect in November 2019, but implementation has been delayed by a legal challenge against the legislation.

==== House of Representatives ====
Human Life Protection Act – Vote in the House of Representatives (April 30, 2019)
Party	Votes for	Votes against	Not voting/Not present
Republican (76)	74	–	2: Jimmy Martin; Chris Sells
Democratic (28)	–	3: Mary Moore; John Rogers; Rod Scott	25
Total (104)	74	3	27

==== Senate ====
Human Life Protection Act – Vote in the Senate (May 14, 2019) (Note: The reference incorrectly identifies Tom Butler as a Democrat. He has been a Republican since 2011.)
Party	Votes for	Votes against	Not voting/Not present
Republican (27)	25: Greg Albritton; Gerald Allen; Will Barfoot; Tom Butler; Clyde Chambliss; Donnie Chesteen; Chris Elliott; Sam Givhan; Garlan Gudger; Andrew Jones; Steve Livingston; Del Marsh; Jim McClendon; Timothy Melson; Arthur Orr; Randy Price; Greg Reed; Daniel Roberts; Clay Scofield; David Sessions; Shay Shelnutt; Larry Stutts; J.T. Waggoner; Cam Ward	–	2: Jimmy Holley; Tom Whatley
Democratic (8)	–	6: Billy Beasley; David Burkette; Linda Coleman-Madison; Vivian Davis Figures; Bobby Singleton; Rodger Smitherman	2: Priscilla Dunn; Malika Sanders-Fortier
Total (35)	25	6	4

== Legal challenge ==
On October 29, 2019, U.S. District Judge Myron Herbert Thompson issued a preliminary injunction against the abortion ban, preventing the legislation from entering into effect on November 15. Thompson wrote an opinion in which he argued that "Alabama's abortion ban contravenes clear Supreme Court precedent. It violates the right of an individual to privacy, to make choices central to personal dignity and autonomy. It diminishes the capacity of women to act in society, and to make reproductive decisions. It defies the United States Constitution." On June 24, 2022, After the U.S. Supreme Court overturned Roe v. Wade in Dobbs v. Jackson Women's Health Organization, Judge Thompson lifted the injunction; as a result, the law went into effect.

== Reaction ==
Following the passage of the Human Life Protection Act, Vice President Mike Pence applauded the state of Alabama for "embracing life". Evangelist Franklin Graham said he was thankful to the Alabama governor and the legislators who passed the bill, and continued by saying: "I hope and pray many other governors will be encouraged by her boldness and do the same." Conservative columnist David A. French opined that the law and other abortion restrictions could potentially lead to Roe v. Wade being overturned.

Some Republican and conservative leaders have stated their opposition to the Human Life Protection Act. Senator Mitt Romney of Utah stated that he did not support it because there should be exceptions for rape, incest, and danger to the life of the mother. Republican House Minority Leader Kevin McCarthy and Republican U.S. Senator Lisa Murkowski expressed opposition to the law for the same reasons. Senator Susan Collins, a Republican from Maine, said that she was "very much opposed to the Alabama law", and that it was "completely inconsistent with Roe v. Wade". On The 700 Club, conservative televangelist Pat Robertson stated, "It's an extreme law and they want to challenge Roe v. Wade, but my humble view is that this is not the case we want to bring to the Supreme Court because I think this one will lose". Conservative commentator Tomi Lahren called the bill "too restrictive" and said the ban "forces women into more dangerous methods" of abortion. Former president Donald Trump did not express opposition, but re-affirmed that he was opposed to abortion rights except in situations arising from rape, incest, and danger to the life of the mother.

Hillary Clinton, the Democratic nominee of the 2016 United States presidential election, called the bill and similar legislation across the country "appalling attacks on women's lives and fundamental freedoms". Other Democratic politicians expressing opposition to the law included President Joe Biden; House Speaker Nancy Pelosi; Senate Minority Leader Chuck Schumer; U.S. senators Cory Booker, Kirsten Gillibrand, Kamala Harris, Doug Jones; Amy Klobuchar, Bernie Sanders, Elizabeth Warren, Representative Alexandria Ocasio-Cortez; former Representative Beto O'Rourke; former U.S. Secretary of Housing and Urban Development and mayor of San Antonio Julian Castro; and South Bend mayor Pete Buttigieg. Jena Griswold, the Democratic Secretary of State of Colorado, announced that she was banning work-related travel to Alabama in response to the bill. Maryland Comptroller Peter Franchot called on the state's pension system to divest itself from Alabama-based companies because of the bill.

Abortion rights groups such as POWER House demonstrated in the state capital in opposition to the bill. On May 19, hundreds of people protested the legislation at the state capitol. After the passage of the bill, advocacy groups within the state of Alabama began receiving more donations. According to the Yellowhammer Fund, after a social media campaign that involved sports journalist Shea Serrano and U.S. senators and presidential candidates Gillibrand and Harris, the group received tens of thousands of dollars that would enable it to expand its services. Planned Parenthood Southeast president and CEO Staci Fox vowed to take legal action against the state for enacting the bill.

A previously unreleased poll from 2018 conducted on behalf of Planned Parenthood Southeast found that 31 percent of people in the state of Alabama would support a bill that would ban abortion with no exceptions for rape and incest.
