= Josh Carnley =

American politician

Member of the Alabama Senate from the 31st district
- Incumbent
- Assumed office November 8, 2022
- Preceded by: Jimmy Holley

Personal details
- Born: Ino, Alabama
- Party: Republican
- Education: Degree in Agricultural Science, Auburn University
- Alma mater: Auburn University
- Profession: Enterprise Sanbuck Insurance

Josh Carnley is an American Republican politician who serves the 31st district in the Alabama Senate. He was elected on November 8, 2022, in the 2022 election, and was reelected in the 2026 elections.

== Career ==
Josh Carnley owns SanBuck Insurance, serves on the Choctawhatchee, Pea, and Yellow Rivers Watershed Management Authority, and previously served as the Coffee County Commissioner for District 1.

== Committees ==
He serves on the committee on County & Municipal Government, the committee on Agriculture, Conservation, & Forestry, Banking & Insurance, the committee on Fiscal Responsibility & Economic Development, and the committee on Veterans, Military Affairs, & Public Safety.
