= Alabama's 3rd Senate district =

American legislative district

Alabama's 3rd State Senate district
Senator
Arthur Orr; R–Decatur
- Demographics: 70.9% White; 16.1% Black; 8.1% Hispanic; 1.3% Asian
- Population (2022): 150,551

Alabama's 3rd Senate district is one of 35 districts in the Alabama Senate. The district has been represented by Arthur Orr since 2006.

== Geography ==
The district contains the entirety of Morgan County, and portions of Limestone and Madison counties.

== Geography ==
Election	Map	Counties in District
2026; 2022		Morgan, portions of Limestone, Madison
2018		Morgan, portions of Limestone, Madison
2014		Morgan, portions of Limestone, Madison
2010; 2006; 2002		Morgan, portions of Limestone, Madison

== Election history ==
=== Elections in the 2020s ===
Alabama Senate election, 2022: Senate District 3
Party	Candidate	Votes	%	±%
Republican	Arthur Orr (Incumbent)	30,578	86.49	−10.85
Libertarian	Rick Chandler	4,566	12.91	+12.91
Write-in		211	0.60	-2.06
Majority		26,012	73.57	−21.10
Turnout		35,355		
Republican hold				

=== Elections in the 2010s ===
Alabama Senate election, 2018: Senate District 3
Party	Candidate	Votes	%	±%
Republican	Arthur Orr (Incumbent)	37,295	97.34	−1.15
Write-in		1,021	2.66	+1.15
Majority		36,274	94.67	−2.31
Turnout		38,316		
Republican hold				

Alabama Senate election, 2014: Senate District 3
Party	Candidate	Votes	%	±%
Republican	Arthur Orr (Incumbent)	26,906	98.49	−0.43
Write-in		412	1.51	+0.43
Majority		26,494	96.98	−0.86
Turnout		27,318		
Republican hold				

Alabama Senate election, 2010: Senate District 3
Party	Candidate	Votes	%	±%
Republican	Arthur Orr (Incumbent)	39,245	98.92	+36.55
Write-in		429	1.08	+0.87
Majority		38,816	97.84	+73.09
Turnout		39,674		
Republican hold				

=== Elections in the 2000s ===
Alabama Senate election, 2006: Senate District 3
Party	Candidate	Votes	%	±%
Republican	Arthur Orr	24,769	62.27	+24.93
Democratic	Bobby Day	14,923	37.52	−25.06
Write-in		85	0.21	+0.13
Majority		9,846	24.75	−0.49
Turnout		39,777		
Republican gain from Democratic				

Alabama Senate election, 2002: Senate District 3
Party	Candidate	Votes	%	±%
Democratic	Tommy Ed Roberts (Incumbent)	26,359	62.58	−11.05
Republican	Terry Smith	15,729	37.34	+11.03
Write-in		35	0.08	+0.02
Majority		10,630	25.24	−22.07
Turnout		42,123		
Democratic hold				

=== Elections in the 1990s ===
Alabama Senate election, 1998: Senate District 3
Party	Candidate	Votes	%	±%
Democratic	Tommy Ed Roberts (Incumbent)	28,721	73.63	+17.89
Republican	Jack Buchanan	10,265	26.31	−17.89
Write-in		23	0.06	+0.00
Majority		18456	47.31	+29.76
Turnout		39,009		
Democratic hold				

Alabama Senate election, 1994: Senate District 3
Party	Candidate	Votes	%	±%
Democratic	Tommy Ed Roberts	21,471	58.74	−5.15
Republican	G. Gentry	15,057	41.20	+5.15
Write-in		22	0.06	+0.00
Majority		6,414	17.55	−10.28
Turnout		36,550		
Democratic hold				

Alabama Senate election, 1990: Senate District 3
Party	Candidate	Votes	%	±%
Democratic	Ray Campbell (Incumbent)	20,573	63.89	−36.11
Republican	Terry Smith	11,610	36.05	+36.05
Write-in		18	0.06	+0.06
Majority		8,963	27.83	
Turnout		32,201		
Democratic hold				

=== Elections in the 1980s ===
Alabama Senate election, 1986: Senate District 3
Party	Candidate	Votes	%	±%
Democratic	Ray Campbell	25,411	100.00	+25.18
Majority		25,411	100.00	+50.34
Turnout		25,411		
Democratic hold				

Alabama Senate election, 1983: Senate District 3
Party	Candidate	Votes	%	±%
Democratic	Gary Aldridge (Incumbent)	7,315	74.82	−25.17
Republican	Ed Humphries	2,460	25.16	+25.16
Write-in		2	0.02	+0.01
Majority		4,855	49.66	−50.32
Turnout		9,777		
Democratic hold				

Alabama Senate election, 1982: Senate District 3
Party	Candidate	Votes	%	±%
Democratic	Gary Aldridge	19,569	99.99	
Write-in		2	0.01	
Majority		19,567	99.98	
Turnout		19,571		
Democratic hold				

== District officeholders ==
Senators take office at midnight on the day of their election.

- Arthur Orr (2006–present)
- Tommy Ed Roberts (1994–2006)
- Ray Campbell (1986–1994)
- Gary Aldridge (1982–1986)
- Charles Martin (1978–1982)
- Bingham Edwards (1974–1978)
- Gene McLain (1970–1974)
- Jack Giles Sr. (1966–1970)
- Harlan G. Allen (1962–1966)
- Elwood Rutledge (1958–1962)
- Harlan G. Allen (1954–1958)
