= Alabama's 31st Senate district =

Electoral district of Alabama

Alabama's 31st State Senate district
Senator
Josh Carnley; R–Ino
- Demographics: 70.4% White; 19.3% Black; 5.1% Hispanic; 1.1% Asian
- Population (2022): 137,117

Alabama's 31st Senate district is one of 35 districts in the Alabama Senate. The district has been represented by Josh Carnley since 2022.

== Geography ==
Election	Map	Counties in District
2026; 2022		Coffee, Covington, Pike, portion of Dale
2018		Coffee, Covington, Pike, portion of Dale
2014		Coffee, Covington, Pike, portion of Dale
2010; 2006; 2002		Coffee, Covington, portions of Dale, Houston

== Election history ==
=== Elections in the 2020s ===
Alabama Senate election, 2022: Senate District 31
Party	Candidate	Votes	%	±%
Republican	Josh Carnley	30,618	98.88	+0.40
Write-in		348	1.12	-0.40
Majority		30,270	97.75	+0.78
Turnout		30,966		
Republican hold				

=== Elections in the 2010s ===
Alabama Senate election, 2018: Senate District 31
Party	Candidate	Votes	%	±%
Republican	Jimmy Holley (Incumbent)	33,137	98.48	+25.80
Write-in		510	1.52	+1.38
Majority		32,627	96.97	+51.47
Turnout		33,647		
Republican hold				

Alabama Senate election, 2014: Senate District 31
Party	Candidate	Votes	%	±%
Republican	Jimmy Holley (Incumbent)	23,067	72.68	−25.52
Democratic	Larry Greenwood	8,627	27.18	+27.18
Write-in		43	0.14	-1.66
Majority		14,440	45.50	−50.91
Turnout		31,737		
Republican hold				

Alabama Senate election, 2010: Senate District 31
Party	Candidate	Votes	%	±%
Republican	Jimmy Holley (Incumbent)	29,301	98.20	+54.56
Write-in		536	1.80	+1.74
Majority		28,765	96.41	+83.75
Turnout		29,837		
Republican hold				

=== Elections in the 2000s ===
Alabama Senate election, 2006: Senate District 31
Party	Candidate	Votes	%	±%
Democratic	Jimmy Holley (Incumbent)	19,323	56.30	−8.87
Republican	Dwight L. Adams	14,979	43.64	+9.10
Write-in		19	0.06	-0.23
Majority		4,344	12.66	−17.97
Turnout		34,321		
Democratic hold				

Holley joined the Republican Party in January 2008.

Alabama Senate election, 2002: Senate District 31
Party	Candidate	Votes	%	±%
Democratic	Jimmy Holley (Incumbent)	22,517	65.17	+15.04
Republican	Gregory White	11,935	34.54	−15.32
Write-in		100	0.29	+0.27
Majority		10,582	30.63	+30.36
Turnout		34,552		
Democratic hold				

=== Elections in the 1990s ===
Alabama Senate election, 1998: Senate District 31
Party	Candidate	Votes	%	±%
Democratic	Jimmy Holley	16,576	50.13	+0.27
Republican	Dwight L. Adams (Incumbent)	16,486	49.85	−0.27
Write-in		6	0.02	+0.00
Majority		90	0.27	+0.01
Turnout		33,068		
Democratic gain from Republican				

Alabama Senate election, 1994: Senate District 31
Party	Candidate	Votes	%	±%
Republican	Dwight L. Adams	14,888	50.12	+8.00
Democratic	Terry Ellis	14,812	49.86	−8.00
Write-in		5	0.02	+0.01
Majority		76	0.26	
Turnout		29,705		
Republican gain from Democratic				

Alabama Senate election, 1990: Senate District 31
Party	Candidate	Votes	%	±%
Democratic	E. C. Foshee (Incumbent)	16,936	57.86	−42.14
Republican	J. T. Raley	12,329	42.12	+42.12
Write-in		4	0.01	+0.01
Majority		4,607	15.74	−84.26
Turnout		29,269		
Democratic hold				

=== Elections in the 1980s ===
Alabama Senate election, 1986: Senate District 31
Party	Candidate	Votes	%	±%
Democratic	E. C. Foshee (Incumbent)	14,868	100.00	
Majority		14,868	100.00	
Turnout		14,868		
Democratic hold				

Alabama Senate election, 1983: Senate District 31
Party	Candidate	Votes	%	±%
Democratic	E. C. Foshee	1,876	100.00	
Majority		1,876	100.00	
Turnout		1,876		
Democratic hold				

Alabama Senate election, 1982: Senate District 31
Party	Candidate	Votes	%	±%
Democratic	Reo Kirkland Jr. (Incumbent)	18,105	100.00	
Majority		18,105	100.00	
Turnout		18,105		
Democratic hold				

== District officeholders ==
Senators take office at midnight on the day of their election.

- Josh Carnley (2022–present)
- Jimmy Holley (1998–2022)
- Dwight L. Adams (1994–1998)
- E. C. Foshee (1983–1994)
- Reo Kirkland Jr. (1978–1983)
- Maston Mims (1974–1978)

Not in use 1966–1974.

- W. E. Oden (1962–1966)
- Hugh Moses (1958–1962)
- Berry Cantrell (1954–1958)
