= Senator Fielding (disambiguation) =

Senator Fielding may refer to:

- Herbert Fielding (1923–2015), South Carolina State Senate
- Jerry L. Fielding (born 1947), Alabama State Senate
- Steve Fielding (born 1960), Victoria State Senate, Australia
