= Alabama School of Cyber Technology and Engineering =

High school in Huntsville, Alabama, US

Location
- 229 Wynn Drive; Huntsville, Alabama 35805; United States; 34°43′32″N 86°39′21″W

Information
- Type: Public magnet high school
- Motto: ASCTE's mission is to ensure all students achieve high levels of learning to be successful in implementing cyber protections into the engineering lifecycle.
- Established: 2018; 8 years ago
- School district: Madison County Schools
- CEEB code: 010061
- President: Matt Massey
- Grades: 9-12
- Enrollment: 402
- Student to teacher ratio: 23:1
- Team name: Sentinels
- Accreditation: Cognia Accreditation Niche #1 in Best Public High Schools in Huntsville Area
- Website: www.ascte.org

The Alabama School of Cyber Technology and Engineering (ASCTE) is a high school located in Huntsville, Alabama, United States. Founded in 2018, it is the first tuition-free residential high school focused on the integration of cyber technology and engineering across all academic disciplines. The school focuses on teaching various topics relating to cyber, technology, and engineering, integrating such topics into core classes. The school is a magnet school which serves the entire state of Alabama. It requires an application, including both written and visual (video) statements of interest. It receives funding through the Alabama Department of Education for overhead costs, and through sponsorships of major companies, in exchange for students to intern at those companies their senior year.

== Academics ==
ASCTE offers core classes, as well as additional topic-specific classes related to cyber, technology, and engineering. These classes include Mathematics, Science, English, History, Cyber, and Engineering. The school operates on trimesters, and each class (except for senior level classes) takes two terms to complete. This allows students who start as freshman to do four years of classes in three years. Should a student start as a sophomore, they will be placed in freshman level classes, with the exception of English Language classes. At the start of their senior year, the student will have finished four courses of English Language and three courses of every other subject.

Students who start as freshman will spend their entire senior year doing an internship at one of ASCTE's several sponsors. Notable sponsors include Northrop Grumman, Lockheed Martin, Leidos, and RTX. This is preceded by a capstone project chosen by the student. For students who start in their sophomore year, in their first semester they take the last courses needed for graduation in addition to completing their capstone project. They then complete a shorter internship in their last semester.

== Student life ==
ASCTE students can choose to either live on campus in a dormitory, or to matriculate to and from the school. Residential students do not have to pay for boarding unless they live within a 25-mile radius of the ASCTE campus. Food is provided for a meal fee of $1,400 per year for commuter students (breakfast and lunch), and $2,000 per year for residential students (breakfast, lunch, dinner on weekdays; brunch and dinner on weekends). Activities are regularly hosted, although most events are exclusive to residential students. The activity fee is $150 per year for commuter students and $300 per year for residential students.

== History ==
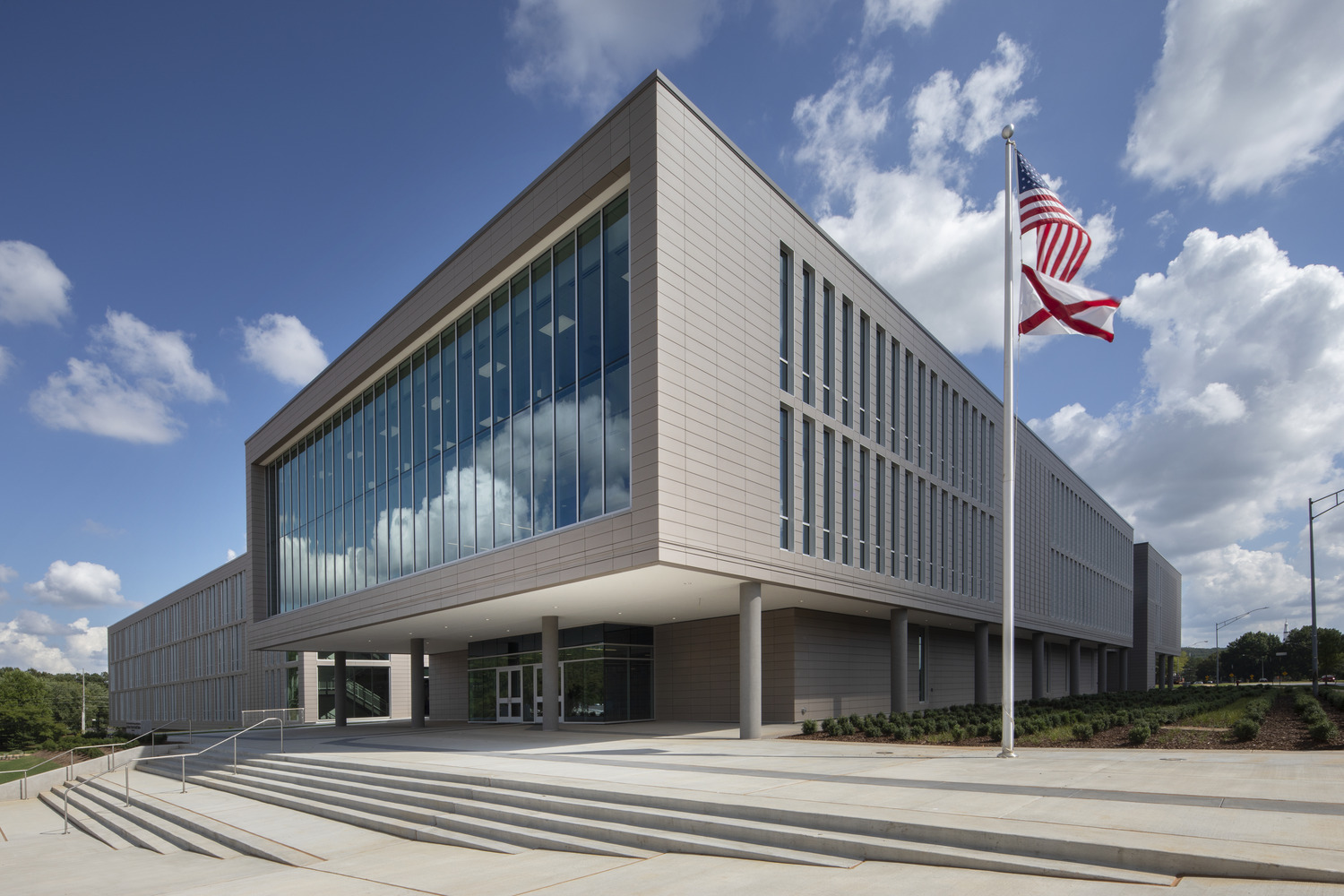
2022 newly constructed campus for ASCTE

On January 9, 2018, Governor Kay Ivey gave her State of the State address. During this address, the Governor announced her intent to create ASCTE and for it to be based in Huntsville. ASCTE was founded by Senate Bill 212, Alabama School of Cyber Technology and Engineering in 2018 after efforts by Cyber Huntsville, Huntsville/Madison County Chamber of Commerce, and The Alabama School of Cyber and Engineering Foundation. The bill was sponsored by Alabama Senator Arthur Orr and Alabama Representative Anthony Daniels. ASCTE's funding first came from House Bill 175, the Education Budget, which was also signed by Governor Kay Ivey. Although founded in 2018, ASCTE never had a dedicated campus until 2022. ASCTE's new campus consists of spaces for classrooms, speakers, metalworking, and housing. The large windowed space at the front of ASCTE's campus overlooking U.S. Space & Rocket Center’s replica of the Saturn V is dubbed the "Schola" by teachers and students alike. The student activities center includes a gymnasium, a wide range of office spaces, and student lounges. ASCTE President Matt Massey described the upcoming student activities center as "a hub where talent will flourish, passions will be nurtured, and friendships will be forged."

In early January 2026, the student activities center, known colloquially as the "Sentinel Center", had its first home basketball game. On April 17, 2026, ASCTE held its official ribbon-cutting ceremony for its new girls' dorm and national research facility. The ceremony was attended by Hank Isenberg, Tommy Battle, Arthur Orr, and several other notable individuals. The building was dubbed the "Isenberg Institute" after Hank Isenberg's $3 million donation.

== Isenberg Institute ==
The Isenberg Institute is a planned research center, named after Hank Isenberg's $3 million donation. The Isenberg Institute will be one of the first research centers for a secondary school. The research center will focus on fields such as, artificial intelligence, quantum computing, and cybersecurity. Along with conducting research in these fields, the Isenberg Institute will also help other ASCTE goals to spread STEM and cybersecurity to other schools for the entire state of Alabama through their ACCEL program. Additionally, the Isenberg Institute is part of a larger strategic plan by ASCTE to establish more connections with world class research, publish findings from the Isenberg Institute, and to provide students with paths to acquire patents and protect their intellectual rights. ASCTE's 2025-2030 Strategic Plan states that they want to be the first secondary school to achieve recognition as a research center.

== Clubs ==
ASCTE clubs include SGA, Garden Club, Drama, Scholars Bowl, Drone Racing, Yearbook, CyberPatriot, Present Day Disciples, Board Games, Girls Fitness, Literary, First Tech Challenge, Band, Beta Club, Ambassadors, Radio, Sentinel Service club, Mu Alpha Theta, Chess Club, Pickleball, and Rocketry.

First Tech Challenge past results for ASCTE
Team	2023–2024		2024–2025		2025–2026	
	World percentage	Position at Alabama State Championship qualifiers	World percentage	Position at Alabama State Championship qualifiers	World percentage	Position at Alabama State Championship qualifiers
Ceaser Circuitry	83.37%	9th	84.71%	11th	73.80%	8th
Guardians of the Cyberspace	28.02%	17th	73.48%	4th	28.02%	17th
Cybersteel	N/A	N/A	N/A	N/A	76.51%	10th

Went to FIRST World Championship
Went to FIRST Premier Event
Won Alabama State Championship robot game finals

Past results for ASCTE Greenpower

#Note ASCTE has only raced in the modified division
	Season and national ranking	
	2024–2025	2025–2026
ASCTE Team 100	27	22
ASCTE Team 97	24	23

== Athletics ==
On November 7, 2025, ASCTE played New Century Technology High School in a game of Ultimate Frisbee for New Century homecoming game, leading to a 14–6 victory for ASCTE. ASCTE offers many sports for their students including for fall, Cross Country, Volleyball, and Swim. ASCTE winter sports include basketball, bowling, indoor track, wrestling, and cheer. ASCTE spring sports include archery, soccer, outdoor track, and tennis.

Note: data is likely incomplete.

ASCTE athletic records
Sport	Overall record	Overall winning percentage	Best season	Best season record	Best season winning percentage
V basketball	36–52	.409	2024–25	14–8	.636
JV basketball	4–4	.500	2024–25	2–1	.667
V soccer	20–35–1	.366	2025–26	8–6	.571
JV soccer	5–9–3	.381	2021–22	3–3–1	.500
Girls' basketball	1–55	.018	2026-27	1-1	.500
Girls' soccer	13–41	.241	2025–26	8–7	.533
V volleyball	46–33	.582	2025–26	15–7	.682

Note: data is likely incomplete.

ASCTE athletics by season
Year	Girls' basketball	V basketball	JV basketball	V soccer	Girls' soccer	Volleyball	JV soccer
2021–22	0–4	0–6	0–2	3–3	1–9	0–7	3–3–1
2022–23	0–11	0–11	0–0	2–11	2–10	10–9	1–3–1
2023–24	0–9	5–14	2–1	3–9	1–7	6–3	0–1
2024–25	0–17	14–8	2–1	4–6–1	1–8	15–7	1–0
2025–26	0–23	17–13	0–0	8–6	8–7	15–7	0–1–1
2026–27	0–1	1–0	1–0	-	-	-	-
