= Alabama's 2nd Senate district =

American legislative district

Alabama's 2nd State Senate district
Senator
Tom Butler; R–Florence
- Demographics: 58.8% White; 26.9% Black; 6% Hispanic; 3.8% Asian
- Population (2022): 154,134

Alabama's 2nd Senate district is one of 35 districts in the Alabama Senate. The district currently is represented by Tom Butler (Republican).

== Geography ==
Election	Map	Counties in District
2026; 2022		Portions of Limestone, Madison
2018		Portions of Limestone, Madison
2014		Portions of Limestone, Madison
2010; 2006; 2002		Portions of Limestone, Madison

== Election history ==
=== Elections in the 2020s ===
Alabama Senate election, 2022: Senate District 2
Party	Candidate	Votes	%	±%
Republican	Tom Butler (Incumbent)	25,951	55.52	+1.25
Democratic	Kim Caudle Lewis	20,749	44.39	−1.25
Write-in		43	0.09	+0.00
Majority		5,202	11.13	+2.50
Turnout		46,743		
Republican hold				

=== Elections in the 2010s ===
Alabama Senate election, 2018: Senate District 2
Party	Candidate	Votes	%	±%
Republican	Tom Butler	31,997	54.27	−41.99
Democratic	Amy Wasyluka	26,911	45.64	+45.64
Write-in		54	0.09	-3.65
Majority		5,086	8.63	−83.90
Turnout		58,962		
Republican hold				

Alabama Senate election, 2014: Senate District 2
Party	Candidate	Votes	%	±%
Republican	Bill Holtzclaw (Incumbent)	24,936	96.26	+37.39
Write-in		968	3.74	+3.68
Majority		23,968	92.53	+74.74
Turnout		25,904		
Republican hold				

Alabama Senate election, 2010: Senate District 2
Party	Candidate	Votes	%	±%
Republican	Bill Holtzclaw	33,050	58.87	+19.33
Democratic	Tom Butler (Incumbent)	23,060	41.07	−19.32
Write-in		35	0.06	-0.01
Majority		9,990	17.79	−3.06
Turnout		56,145		
Republican gain from Democratic				

=== Elections in the 2000s ===
Alabama Senate election, 2006: Senate District 2
Party	Candidate	Votes	%	±%
Democratic	Tom Butler (Incumbent)	24,584	60.39	+2.88
Republican	Jim Burden	16,096	39.54	−2.51
Write-in		30	0.07	-0.37
Majority		8,488	20.85	−5.38
Turnout		40,710		
Democratic hold				

Alabama Senate election, 2002: Senate District 2
Party	Candidate	Votes	%	±%
Democratic	Tom Butler (Incumbent)	23,922	57.51	−2.51
Republican	Steve Andrews	17,488	42.05	+2.12
Write-in		183	0.44	+0.39
Majority		6,434	15.47	−4.61
Turnout		41,593		
Democratic hold				

=== Elections in the 1990s ===
Alabama Senate election, 1998: Senate District 2
Party	Candidate	Votes	%	±%
Democratic	Tom Butler (Incumbent)	27,007	60.02	+7.84
Republican	Hugh McInnish	17,970	39.93	−7.88
Write-in		23	0.05	+0.04
Majority		9,037	20.08	+15.71
Turnout		45,000		
Democratic hold				

Alabama Senate election, 1994: Senate District 2
Party	Candidate	Votes	%	±%
Democratic	Tom Butler	19,699	52.18	−12.18
Republican	Jim Manley	18,048	47.81	+12.17
Write-in		3	0.01	+0.00
Majority		1,651	4.37	−24.35
Turnout		37,750		
Democratic hold				

Alabama Senate election, 1990: Senate District 2
Party	Candidate	Votes	%	±%
Democratic	Jim Smith (Incumbent)	23,444	64.36	−35.64
Republican	Jim Manley	12,982	35.64	+35.64
Write-in		3	0.01	+0.01
Majority		10,462	28.72	
Turnout		36,429		
Democratic hold				

=== Elections in the 1980s ===
Alabama Senate election, 1986: Senate District 2
Party	Candidate	Votes	%	±%
Democratic	Jim Smith	20,166	100.00	+24.08
Majority		20,166	100.00	+48.16
Turnout		20,166		
Democratic hold				

Alabama Senate election, 1983: Senate District 1
Party	Candidate	Votes	%	±%
Democratic	Jim Smith	7,120	75.92	−24.08
Independent	Marvin A. Clem	2,258	24.08	+24.08
Majority		4,862	51.84	−48.16
Turnout		9,378		
Democratic hold				

Alabama Senate election, 1982: Senate District 1
Party	Candidate	Votes	%	±%
Democratic	Roger Bedford Jr.	26,316	100.00	
Majority		26,316	100.00	
Turnout		26,316		
Democratic hold				

== District officeholders ==
Senators take office at midnight on the day of their election.

- Tom Butler (2018-present)
- Bill Holtzclaw (2010-2018)
- Tom Butler (1994-2010)
- Jim Smith (1986-1994)
- Roger Bedford Jr. (1982-1983)
- Charlie Britnell (1978-1982)
- Joe Fine (1974-1978)
- Bob Harris (1966-1974)
- Bob Gilchrist (1962-1966)
- Robert R. Berryman (1958-1962)
- Joe Calvin (1954-1958)
