= Kirk Hatcher =

American politician of Alabama

Member of the Alabama Senate from the 26th district
- Incumbent
- Assumed office March 3, 2021
- Preceded by: David Burkette

Member of the Alabama House of Representatives from the 78th district
- In office November 6, 2018 – March 2, 2021
- Preceded by: Alvin Holmes
- Succeeded by: Kenyatté Hassell

Personal details
- Born: 1964 or 1965 (age 60–61) Montgomery, Alabama, U.S.
- Party: Democratic
- Education: Morehouse College (BA); Emory University (MDiv)

Kirk Hatcher (born 1964/1965) is an American politician from the state of Alabama. He currently represents Alabama's 26th District in the Alabama State Senate. He is a member of the Democratic Party.

== Education ==
Hatcher graduated from Morehouse College in 1988 with a Bachelor of Arts degree in English Language and Literature. He later enrolled in Emory University, where he earned a Masters of Divinity degree in Theology in 1997.

== Career ==
After graduating from Emory, Hatcher moved to Rye, New York, where he worked as an English teacher at Rye County Day School. After resigning his position in 2015, he moved back to his hometown, Montgomery, Alabama, where he worked in community organization. In 2018, he ran for a position in the Alabama House of Representatives in District 78, which covers downtown Montgomery. He came in 2nd place in the initial Democratic primary election held on June 5, 2018, winning 37.6% of the vote and causing a runoff. In the runoff held 2 months later, Hatcher defeated incumbent Representative Alvin Holmes by 17.4%. Hatcher decisively defeated his independent opponent, Tijuanna Adetunji, in the November general election with 83.4% to her 16.3%. Hatcher's success was backed by several lobbying groups, including the Alabama Education Association, Medical Association of the State of Alabama, Alabama Bankers Association, Alabama Forestry Association, and Alabama Rural Electricity Association. After the resignation of Senator David Burkette, Hatcher ran for the empty seat in the Alabama Senate's District 26. He won the initial open primary with 47.9% of votes, although because he did not win a majority of the vote, there had to be a runoff election. In the runoff, Hatcher triumphed over his opponent, John Knight, winning with 74.2% of the vote. In the general election, Hatcher defeated Republican William Green with over 78% of votes cast.

In 2024, Hatcher strongly considered running for United States Representative in the 2nd congressional district (which was redrawn after the Supreme Court case Allen v. Milligan), although he eventually decided not to.

=== Committee Positions ===
Hatcher is a member of the Banking and Insurance, Education Policy, Tourism, and Transportation and Energy Committees.

== Elections ==
=== Alabama House of Representatives District 78 ===
==== 2018 Democratic Primary ====
2018 Democratic Primary
Party	Candidate	Votes	%
Democratic	Alvin Holmes	2,116	45.9%
Democratic	Kirk Hatcher	1,736	37.6%
Democratic	Terrance Dawson	759	16.5%
Total votes		4,611	100.0%

==== 2018 Democratic Runoff ====
2018 Democratic Runoff
Party	Candidate	Votes	%
Democratic	Kirk Hatcher	1,704	58.7%
Democratic	Alvin Holmes	1,200	41.3%
Total votes		2,904	100.0%

==== 2018 General Election ====
2018 General Election
Party	Candidate	Votes	%
Democratic	Kirk Hatcher	9,506	83.4%
Independent	Tijuanna Adetunji	1,860	16.3%
Write-in		30	0.3%
Total votes		11,396	100.0%

=== Alabama State Senate District 26 ===
==== 2020 Democratic Primary ====
2018 Democratic Primary
Party	Candidate	Votes	%
Democratic	Kirk Hatcher	2,513	47.9%
Democratic	John Knight	1,091	20.8%
Democratic	Linda Douglas Burkette	541	10.3%
Democratic	TaShina Morris	496	9.5%
Democratic	Janet May	400	7.6%
Democratic	Deborah Anthony	202	3.9%
Total votes		5,243	100.0%

==== 2020 Democratic Runoff ====
2020 Democratic Runoff
Party	Candidate	Votes	%
Democratic	Kirk Hatcher	3,961	74.2%
Democratic	John Knight	1,374	25,8%
Total votes		5,335	100.0%

==== 2020 General Election ====
2020 General Election
Party	Candidate	Votes	%
Democratic	Kirk Hatcher	4,565	78.3%
Republican	William Green	1,254	21.5%
Write-in		8	0.1%
Total votes		5,827	100.0%
