= Fred Plump =

American politician (born 1946/1947)

Member of the Alabama House of Representatives from the 55th district
- In office November 10, 2022 – May 23, 2023
- Preceded by: Rod Scott
- Succeeded by: Travis Hendrix

Personal details
- Born: 1946 or 1947 (age 79–80)
- Party: Democratic
- Profession: Firefighter; sports coach
- Criminal information
- Status: Plea bargain
- Criminal charges: 1 count of conspiracy to commit wire fraud; 1 count of obstruction of justice

Fred L. Plump Jr. (born 1946 or 1947) is an American politician who was a member of the Alabama House of Representatives from 2022 until his resignation in 2023. A member of the Democratic Party, Plump represented the state's 55th district before facing criminal corruption charges.

== Early life and career ==
Plump, a resident of Fairfield, Alabama, was drafted into the United States Army in his youth and served a year-long tour in Vietnam. After returning, he was a member of the Alabama National Guard for 37 years. He is a graduate of Lawson State Community College, with an associate degree in business administration, as well as the University of Alabama at Birmingham, where he attained an emergency medical technology certification. Plump also attended the Alabama Fire College and Alabama Military Academy.

In 1972, Plump was rejected a job at the fire department of Birmingham, Alabama; he sued on the grounds of racial discrimination and won the case. Plump went on to serve in the Birmingham Fire Department for over 30 years. In 1982, he again sued the department, attempting to promote one-to-one hiring practices regarding race. Plump retired from firefighting in 2004, having attained the position of lieutenant in the Birmingham Fire Department. Plump also worked as a part-time case manager for the conservator's office of Jefferson County, Alabama.

Plump was involved with local community sports in Jefferson County for over 40 years, leading to his nickname of "Coach." He founded the Piper Davis Youth Baseball League and served as president of the Magic City Youth Football League.

== Political career ==
=== Early elections ===
Plump first entered politics in 2006, when he ran for election to the Alabama House of Representatives' 57th district. Although he lost the House race, he was elected to the Alabama Democratic Party's state executive committee that year.

In 2008, Governor Bob Riley made an appointment to fill a vacancy on the Jefferson County Commission; in response, Plump sued Riley and challenged that the governor did not have the legal right to make the appointment without the U.S. Department of Justice's approval. Plump's legal challenge won out in a federal panel review, but the panel did not pass judgment on what should be done regarding the vacancy. Jefferson County chose to not fulfill the appointment and instead held a special election for the commission's first district that year. Plump did not initially intend to run in the election, but was encouraged by friends to do so. After declaring his candidacy, Plump said he would focus on economic development and fight to keep Cooper Green Mercy Hospital, which was facing closure, open. Plump's other key issues included education and benefiting senior citizens. Plump lost the election, finishing in third place with 10.35% of the vote.

Plump again ran for election to district 57 in 2010, challenging incumbent representative Merika Coleman. He lost the Democratic primary with 21% of the vote, finishing in second behind Coleman.

=== Alabama House of Representatives election and tenure ===
Re-districted to the 55th district in the Alabama House of Representatives, Plump mounted another bid for the state house in 2022. Plump said he decided to run again in 2022 because of his frustrations with what he saw as inaction from elected officials, charging that they were "not putting a lot of effort into doing things". The incumbent representative, Rod Scott, faced challenges from within the Alabama Democratic Primary for apparent disloyalty to the House Democratic Caucus, with Democratic leadership saying that Scott was "being too bipartisan". The Democratic primary became a five-way race, with Plump and Scott advancing to a runoff. The runoff election in June 2022 was close enough to where Scott requested a recount. The recount affirmed that Plump won the primary, beating out Scott by just 33 votes.

Having unseated Scott in the Democratic primary, Plump was unopposed in the general election and took office in November 2022. As representative, Plump pledged to help improve the pay of first responders and teachers. He was assigned to the House Military and Veterans Committee, on which he sponsored House Bill 92, which would expand fee exemptions for vehicle registrations to all former and current members of the United States Armed Forces.

Following his criminal charges and subsequent resignation, Plump was succeeded in the 55th district by Birmingham police sergeant Travis Hendrix.

=== Criminal charges ===
In May 2023, the U.S. Department of Justice charged Plump with criminal conspiracy and obstruction of justice. Federal prosecutors accused Plump of conspiring to defraud the Jefferson County Community Service Fund by filing false reports about fund usage to county officials. The Department of Justice said that another legislator in the Alabama House of Representatives directed $400,000 to the Piper Davis Youth Baseball League, of which Plump was still the executive director. According to the filing, Plump then gave $200,000 in kickbacks to an assistant for the other, unnamed legislator.

Fellow Democratic representative John Rogers publicly disclosed that he was the unnamed legislator in Plump's charges and said he had been communicating with the Department of Justice, but maintained his innocence. Rogers himself was later indicted on charges of obstruction of justice in September 2023.

Before being charged and after an interview with federal agents, Plump allegedly texted the involved assistant "red alert", which led to Plump's charge of obstruction of justice. Plump pled guilty to both the criminal conspiracy and obstruction of justice charges; he agreed to resign from his legislature seat as part of his plea on May 23, 2023, less than six months after taking office. Plump also agreed to pay back at least $200,000 to the Jefferson County Community Service Fund. The maximum penalty for Plump's charges include 20 years in prison and $250,000 fines each.

== Personal life ==
Plump and his wife have five children and several grandchildren. He has been a resident of Jefferson County, Alabama's first district for the entirety of his adult life.
