= Alabama's 11th Senate district =

Alabama's 11th State Senate district
Senator
Lance Bell; R–Pell City
- Demographics: 74.1% White; 19.9% Black; 2.6% Hispanic; 0.4% Asian
- Population (2022): 148,957

Alabama's 11th Senate district is one of 35 districts in the Alabama Senate. The district has been represented by Lance Bell since 2022.

== Geography ==
Election	Map	Counties in District
2026; 2022		Portions of Shelby, St. Clair, Talladega
2018		Portions of Shelby, St. Clair, Talladega
2014		Portions of Shelby, St. Clair, Talladega
2010; 2006; 2002		Coosa, Talladega, portions of Calhoun, Elmore

== Election history ==
=== Elections in the 2020s ===
Alabama Senate election, 2022: Senate District 11
Party	Candidate	Votes	%	±%
Republican	Lance Bell	33,505	98.41	+22.44
Write-in		543	1.59	+1.51
Majority		32,962	96.81	+44.79
Turnout		34,048		
Republican hold				

=== Elections in the 2010s ===
Alabama Senate election, 2018: Senate District 11
Party	Candidate	Votes	%	±%
Republican	Jim McClendon (Incumbent)	36,192	75.97	−1.65
Democratic	Carl Carter	11,411	23.95	+1.67
Write-in		37	0.08	-0.02
Majority		24,781	52.02	−3.32
Turnout		47,640		
Republican hold				

Alabama Senate election, 2014: Senate District 11
Party	Candidate	Votes	%	±%
Republican	Jim McClendon	24,318	77.62	+31.19
Democratic	Ron Crumpton	6,981	22.28	−31.14
Write-in		31	0.10	-0.05
Majority		17,337	55.34	+48.35
Turnout		31,330		
Republican gain from Democratic				

Alabama Senate election, 2010: Senate District 11
Party	Candidate	Votes	%	±%
Democratic	Jerry L. Fielding	19,929	53.42	−10.90
Republican	Ray Robbins	17,323	46.43	+10.85
Write-in		56	0.15	+0.05
Majority		2,606	6.99	
Turnout		37,308		
Democratic hold				

Fielding joined the Republican Party in October 2012.

=== Elections in the 2000s ===
Alabama Senate election, 2006: Senate District 11
Party	Candidate	Votes	%	±%
Democratic	Jim Preuitt (Incumbent)	19,969	64.32	−2.57
Republican	Jim Hethcox	11,045	35.58	+2.79
Write-in		32	0.10	-0.23
Majority		8,924	28.74	−5.36
Turnout		31,046		
Democratic hold				

Preuitt joined the Republican Party in April 2010.

Alabama Senate election, 2002: Senate District 11
Party	Candidate	Votes	%	±%
Democratic	Jim Preuitt (Incumbent)	23,397	66.89	+14.45
Republican	Ralph Bradford	11,469	32.79	−14.70
Write-in		114	0.33	+0.26
Majority		11,928	34.10	+29.15
Turnout		34,980		
Democratic hold				

=== Elections in the 1990s ===
Alabama Senate election, 1998: Senate District 11
Party	Candidate	Votes	%	±%
Democratic	Jim Preuitt	18,433	52.44	+8.40
Republican	Dell Hill (Incumbent)	16,692	47.49	−8.35
Write-in		23	0.07	-0.05
Majority		1,741	4.95	−6.85
Turnout		35,148		
Democratic gain from Republican				

Alabama Senate election, 1994: Senate District 11
Party	Candidate	Votes	%	±%
Republican	Dell Hill	17,117	55.84	+55.84
Democratic	S. Sprayberry	13,501	44.04	−55.78
Write-in		36	0.12	-0.06
Majority		3,616	11.80	−87.84
Turnout		30,654		
Republican gain from Democratic				

Alabama Senate election, 1990: Senate District 11
Party	Candidate	Votes	%	±%
Democratic	Jim Preuitt (Incumbent)	21,091	99.82	+37.53
Write-in		38	0.18	+0.18
Majority		21,053	99.64	+73.33
Turnout		21,129		
Democratic hold				

=== Elections in the 1980s ===
Alabama Senate election, 1986: Senate District 11
Party	Candidate	Votes	%	±%
Democratic	Jim Preuitt	18,594	62.29	−25.23
Republican	Curtis Lambert	10,740	35.98	+35.98
Independent	William Thompson	519	1.74	+1.74
Majority		7,854	26.31	−48.74
Turnout		29,853		
Democratic hold				

Alabama Senate election, 1983: Senate District 11
Party	Candidate	Votes	%	±%
Democratic	John Teague	3,094	87.52	+52.95
Write-in		441	12.48	+12.48
Majority		2,653	75.05	+44.18
Turnout		3,535		
Democratic gain from Republican				

Alabama Senate election, 1982: Senate District 11
Party	Candidate	Votes	%	±%
Republican	William J. Cabaniss	24,786	65.44	
Democratic	Roger Lee	13,093	34.57	
Majority		11,693	30.87	
Turnout		37,879		
Republican gain from Democratic				

== District officeholders ==
Senators take office at midnight on the day of their election.

- Lance Bell (2022–present)
- Jim McClendon (2014–2022)
- Jerry L. Fielding (2010–2014)
- Jim Preuitt (1998–2010)
- Dell Hill (1994–1998)
- Jim Preuitt (1986–1994)
- John Teague (1983–1986)
- William J. Cabaniss (1982–1983)
- Dewey White (1978–1982)
- George McMillan (1974–1978)
- Richard Shelby (1970–1974)
- James A. Branyon II (1966–1970)
- Bill McCain (1962–1966)
- Ryan deGraffenried Sr. (1958–1962)
- E. W. Skidmore (1950–1958)
