= Alabama's 6th Senate district =

Alabama's 6th State Senate district
Senator
Larry Stutts; R–Tuscumbia
- Demographics: 74.9% White; 12.6% Black; 7.3% Hispanic; 0.3% Asian
- Population (2022): 146,259

Alabama's 6th Senate district is one of 35 districts in the Alabama Senate. The district has been represented by Larry Stutts since 2014.

== Geography ==
Election	Map	Counties in District
2026; 2022		Colbert, Franklin, Lawrence, portion of Limestone
2018		Colbert, Franklin, portions of Lauderdale, Lawrence, Marion
2014		Colbert, Franklin, portions of Lauderdale, Lawrence, Marion
2010; 2006; 2002		Franklin, Fayette, Lamar, Marion, portions of Colbert, Lawrence, Winston

== Election history ==
=== Elections in the 2020s ===
Alabama Senate election, 2022: Senate District 6
Party	Candidate	Votes	%	±%
Republican	Larry Stutts (Incumbent)	30,883	86.73	+35.90
Libertarian	Kyle Richard-Garrison	4,598	12.91	+12.91
Write-in		129	0.36	+0.04
Majority		26,235	73.67	
Turnout		35,610		
Republican hold				

=== Elections in the 2010s ===
Alabama Senate election, 2018: Senate District 6
Party	Candidate	Votes	%	±%
Republican	Larry Stutts (Incumbent)	22,683	50.83	+0.77
Democratic	Johnny Mack Morrow	21,796	48.85	−1.02
Write-in		143	0.32	+0.24
Majority		887	1.99	+1.8
Turnout		44,622		
Republican hold				

Alabama Senate election, 2014: Senate District 6
Party	Candidate	Votes	%	±%
Republican	Larry Stutts	17,641	50.06	+3.54
Democratic	Roger Bedford Jr. (Incumbent)	17,574	49.87	−3.53
Write-in		27	0.08	+0.00
Majority		67	0.19	
Turnout		35,242		
Republican gain from Democratic				

Alabama Senate election, 2010: Senate District 6
Party	Candidate	Votes	%	±%
Democratic	Roger Bedford Jr. (Incumbent)	20,452	53.40	−43.92
Republican	Jim Bonner	17,816	46.52	+46.52
Write-in		31	0.08	-2.60
Majority		2,636	6.88	−87.76
Turnout		38,299		
Democratic hold				

=== Elections in the 2000s ===
Alabama Senate election, 2006: Senate District 6
Party	Candidate	Votes	%	±%
Democratic	Roger Bedford Jr. (Incumbent)	24,890	97.32	+36.75
Write-in		685	2.68	+2.47
Majority		24,205	94.64	+73.28
Turnout		25,575		
Democratic hold				

Alabama Senate election, 2002: Senate District 6
Party	Candidate	Votes	%	±%
Democratic	Roger Bedford Jr. (Incumbent)	23,486	60.57	−6.85
Republican	Betty Frazier	15,205	39.22	+6.69
Write-in		82	0.21	+0.16
Majority		8,281	21.36	−13.54
Turnout		38,773		
Democratic hold				

=== Elections in the 1990s ===
Alabama Senate election, 1998: Senate District 6
Party	Candidate	Votes	%	±%
Democratic	Roger Bedford Jr. (Incumbent)	25,636	67.42	−31.23
Republican	Wayne Hardy	12,367	32.53	+32.53
Write-in		19	0.05	-1.30
Majority		13,269	34.90	−62.40
Turnout		38,022		
Democratic hold				

Alabama Senate election, 1994: Senate District 6
Party	Candidate	Votes	%	±%
Democratic	Roger Bedford Jr.	22,489	98.65	+27.70
Write-in		308	1.35	+1.35
Majority		22,181	97.30	+55.39
Turnout		22,797		
Democratic hold				

Alabama Senate election, 1990: Senate District 6
Party	Candidate	Votes	%	±%
Democratic	George Bolling	27,281	70.95	+2.10
Republican	Rebecca Green	11,167	29.04	−2.11
Write-in		1	0.00	+0.00
Majority		16,114	41.91	+4.21
Turnout		38,449		
Democratic hold				

=== Elections in the 1980s ===
Alabama Senate election, 1986: Senate District 6
Party	Candidate	Votes	%	±%
Democratic	Roger Bedford Jr. (Incumbent)	24,400	68.85	−9.58
Republican	Herb Hollingsworth	11,039	31.15	+9.58
Majority		13,361	37.70	−19.17
Turnout		35,439		
Democratic hold				

Alabama Senate election, 1983: Senate District 6
Party	Candidate	Votes	%	±%
Democratic	Roger Bedford Jr.	8,387	78.43	−21.57
Republican	Jim Watley	2,306	21.57	+21.57
Majority		6,081	56.87	−43.13
Turnout		35,439		
Democratic hold				

Alabama Senate election, 1982: Senate District 6
Party	Candidate	Votes	%	±%
Democratic	Jim Smith Jr.	18,426	100.00	
Majority		18,426	100.00	
Turnout		18,426		
Democratic hold				

== District officeholders ==
Senators take office at midnight on the day of their election.

- Larry Stutts (2014–present)
- Roger Bedford Jr. (1994–2014)
- George Bolling (1990–1994)
- Roger Bedford Jr. (1983–1990)
- Jim Smith Jr. (1982–1983)
- Albert McDonald (1974–1982)
- Robert T. Wilson Sr. (1970–1974)
- Fred C. Folsom (1966–1970)
- George C. Hawkins (1962–1966)
- Ray Wyatt (1958–1962)
- E. L Roberts (1954–1958)
