= Travis Hendrix =

American politician

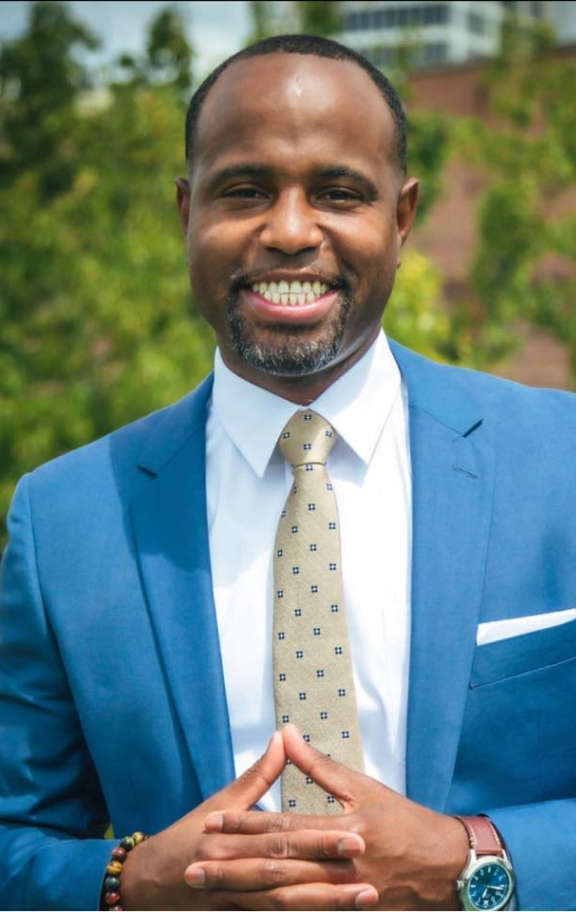

Member of the Alabama House of Representatives from the 55th district
- Incumbent
- Assumed office December 12, 2023
- Preceded by: Fred Plump Jr.

Personal details
- Born: 1982 (age 43–44) Birmingham, Alabama, U.S.
- Party: Democratic
- Education: Miles College; Oakland City University
- Occupation: police officer

Travis Hendrix is an American politician and police officer. He is a Democratic member of the Alabama House of Representatives, representing District 55.

A sergeant in the Birmingham police department, he won a special election to succeed Fred Plump Jr., who resigned after pleading guilty to federal corruption charges.

Born and raised in the Ensley neighborhood of Birmingham, Hendrix attended Ensley High School before completing his GED. He obtained a bachelor's degree from Miles College and a master's degree from Oakland City University.

== Election to the Alabama House of Representatives ==
On May 23, 2023, it was revealed that former representative Fred Plump Jr. was federally charged and would resign from the legislature. In June 2023, Alabama Governor Kay Ivey called a special election to fill the district 55 seat vacated by Plump. Hendrix was one of seven Democrats to qualify for the seat. No Republican or Independent candidates filed. Hendrix ran on addressing economic growth, education, and public safety. Hendrix was endorsed by multiple Democratic state lawmakers and officials, including house minority leader Anthony Daniels and Birmingham Mayor Randall Woodfin.

Hendrix placed first in the Democratic Primary election on September 26, 2023, but the race went to a runoff election because no candidate received fifty percent or more of the vote. Hendrix won the runoff election on October 24, 2023, receiving over 65% of the vote. Hendrix was sworn in on December 12 in Fairfield, Alabama.

== Electoral history ==
2023 Alabama House of Representatives District 55 Special Democratic Primary
Party	Candidate	Votes	%
Democratic	Travis Hendrix	670	27.9%
Democratic	Sylvia Swayne	515	21.4%
Democratic	Phyllis Oden-Jones	485	20.2%
Democratic	Cara McClure	364	15.2%
Democratic	Ves Marable	180	7.5%
Democratic	Kenneth Coachman	106	4.4%
Democratic	Antwon Womack	81	3.4%
Total votes		2,401	100.0%

2023 Alabama House of Representatives District 55 Special Democratic Primary Runoff
Party	Candidate	Votes	%
Democratic	Travis Hendrix	2,367	65.1%
Democratic	Sylvia Swayne	1,268	34.9%
Total votes		3,635	100.0%

Alabama House of Representatives
Preceded by Fred Plump	Member of the Alabama House of Representatives; 2023–present	Succeeded by incumbent
