= Rufus A. Lewis =

American activist and politician

Rufus Lewis

Member of the Alabama House of Representatives from the 77th district
- In office November 8, 1976 – October 7, 1977
- Succeeded by: Charles Langford

Personal details
- Born: November 30, 1906 Montgomery, Alabama, U.S.
- Died: August 19, 1999 (aged 92) Montgomery, Alabama, U.S.
- Party: Democratic
- Education: Fisk University
- Profession: Businessman

Rufus A. Lewis (November 30, 1906 – August 19, 1999) was an American civil rights activist and politician.

== Life and family ==
Rufus Andrew Lewis was born in Montgomery, Alabama on November 30, 1906. He was the fourth and last child of Lula and Jerry Lewis. He had three older sisters: Roberta, Janie, and Corrine. Lewis married in 1935 to Jule Adelaide Clayton, daughter of Mr. and Mrs. William and Frazzie Clayton. They had one child, a daughter, Mrs. Eleanor Lewis Dawkins. The family lived on Bolivar Street in Montgomery, Alabama at the home of William Clayton following his death. The street has since been renamed Rufus A. Lewis Ln and the family home is now the residence of Lewis' granddaughter, Ms. Karen Dawkins. Jule Clayton Lewis died in 1958 following a car accident.

== Education ==
Lewis received his early education in Montgomery County, where no public high school program was available to black children at the time. As a teenager, he attended Alabama State Laboratory High School, a tuition-funded private school with limited capacity that was used by Alabama State College to train teachers. He then went on to attend the Alabama State Teachers' Junior College. Lewis was involved in athletics at the high school and college level, participating in both football and baseball. After junior college, he moved to Nashville, Tennessee, to attend university. Lewis graduated from Fisk University in 1931 with a degree in Business Administration.

== Career ==
Rufus Lewis returned to Alabama after graduating, where he taught for one year at the Conecuh County Training School in Evergreen, Alabama (1931-1932) and then at People's Village School in Mt. Meigs, Alabama (1932-1933). In 1933 Rufus Lewis became a faculty member at Alabama State Teachers College where he worked as the athletic coach and librarian. In 1943, Lewis, a charter member of the graduate chapter of Alpha Upsilon Lambda chapter of Alpha Phi Alpha fraternity, was named the head coach for football and track. He worked as a football coach there until the outbreak of World War II in 1941. Although he was called to serve in the war, a prior injury resulting from a car accident made him ineligible. He went on to spend two years working with the National Defense Project as a civilian. After the war ended, Lewis established classes for black Montgomery residents who wanted to pass the literacy tests they were required to complete to vote.

== Activism ==
Lewis first became active in the voter registration movement in 1938 when he went to work with students in the “Citizenship Club” at Alabama State Laboratory High School. During the early 40s, Lewis set up schools and clinics to teach community members, especially veterans, to fill out the required literacy test to become a registered voter. In 1949 Lewis was hired to lead a program created by the Montgomery School Board in an agreement with the Veterans Administration that offered job training classes for black veterans. In 1952 Lewis founded the Citizens Club, a social club aimed to assist the black community with matters of voter registration. In 1954 Lewis worked with Jo Ann Robinson and E. D. Nixon to organize the Citizen Coordinating Committee to advance efforts in civic consciousness and get people registered to vote.

External videos
- “Interview with Rufus Lewis” from Eyes on the Prize. His discussion centers on the Montgomery Bus Boycott.

He was a member of Dexter Avenue Baptist Church and a founding member of the Montgomery Improvement Association which organized the Montgomery bus boycott. He served on the organization's executive committee and was chairman of the transportation committee and the voter registration committee. At the organization's first meeting, Lewis nominated Martin Luther King Jr. as president.

== Political work ==
Lewis’ early work as a civil rights activist lead to a successful political career later in life. In 1960 he co-founded the Alabama Democratic Conference (ADC). Lewis was the first president of the Montgomery County Democratic Conference, 2nd Congressional District of the Democratic Conference. He was appointed to the Board of Directors of the Montgomery Community Action Committee. He later attended the official signing of the Voting Rights Act of 1965 at the White House. In 1976, he was elected to the Alabama House of Representatives. In 1977 President Jimmy Carter appointed Lewis to become the first Black U.S. Marshal of the Middle District of Alabama. He worked in this role until 1981.

== Honors and awards ==
In 1994, one of Montgomery's libraries was renamed Rufus A. Lewis Regional Library in his honor. The street that he and his wife lived on for many years was also changed from Bolivar Lane to Rufus A. Lewis Lane.

== Head coaching record ==
Year	Team	Overall	Conference	Standing	Bowl/playoffs
Alabama State Hornets (Southern Intercollegiate Athletic Conference) (1934–1942)
1934	Alabama State	4–4–2	2–2–2	T–4th	
1935	Alabama State	9–1–1	6–0–1	1st	
1936	Alabama State	5–2–3	3–2–2	2nd	
1937	Alabama State	3–7	3–6	9th	
1938	Alabama State	4–4–1	4–4–1	6th	
1939	Alabama State	6–2–2	5–1–2	1st	
1940	Alabama State	7–2	5–2	2nd	
1941	Alabama State	4–5	3–4		
1942	Alabama State	0–8	0–8	11th	
Alabama State:		42–35–9	31–29–8		
Total:		42–35–9			
National championship Conference title Conference division title or championship game berth
