= 1996 United States Senate election in Alabama =

- November 5, 1996
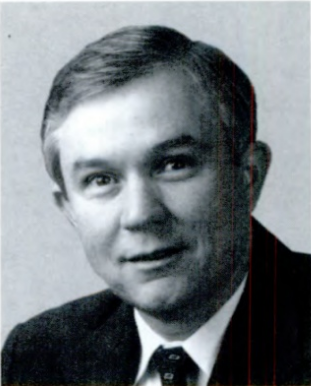

Nominee	Jeff Sessions	Roger Bedford
Party	Republican	Democratic
Popular vote	786,436	681,651
Percentage	52.45%	45.46%
- Sessions: 40–50% 50–60% 60–70% 70–80% Bedford: 40–50% 50–60% 60–70% 70–80% 80–90%
U.S. senator before election
Howell Heflin
Democratic
Elected U.S. Senator
Jeff Sessions
Republican

The 1996 United States Senate election in Alabama was held on November 5, 1996. Incumbent Democratic U.S. Senator Howell Heflin decided to retire. Republican Jeff Sessions won the open seat, becoming the first of his party to win this seat since Reconstruction in 1868 and only the second Republican ever to be popularly elected to the U.S. Senate from Alabama.

The swearing-in or the inauguration of Jeff Sessions marked the first time since 1871 that Republicans simultaneously held both Senate seats. This was the first time ever that a Republican won a full term to this Senate seat.

== Background ==
In the 1968 presidential election, Alabama supported native son and American Independent Party candidate George Wallace over both Richard Nixon and Hubert Humphrey. Wallace was the official Democratic candidate in Alabama, while Humphrey was listed as the "National Democratic". In 1976, Democratic candidate Jimmy Carter from Georgia carried the state, the region, and the nation, but Democratic control of the region slipped after that.

Since 1980, conservative Alabama voters have increasingly voted for Republican candidates at the Federal level, especially in Presidential elections. By contrast, Democratic candidates have been elected to many state-level offices and, until 2010, comprised a longstanding majority in the Alabama Legislature.

Three-term incumbent Howell Heflin decided not to seek re-election. A 75-year-old moderate-to-conservative Democrat, Heflin was re-elected in 1990 with over 60% of the vote. Until 2017, Richard Shelby’s 1992 victory was the last time Democrats won a U.S. Senate seat in Alabama; Shelby later became a Republican in 1994.

== Democratic primary ==
=== Candidates ===
- Roger Bedford, state senator
- Marilyn Q. Bromberg
- Glen Browder, U.S. representative from Jacksonville since 1989
- Natalie Davis, professor of political science at Birmingham-Southern College

=== Results ===
Democratic primary first round results by county Bedford: 30–40%; 40–50%; 50–60%; 60–70%; 70–80%; 80–90%; Browder: 40–50%; 50–60%; 60–70%; 70–80%; Davis: 40–50%; 60–70%

June 4 Democratic primary results
Party	Candidate	Votes	%
Democratic	Roger Bedford	141,360	44.77%
Democratic	Glen Browder	91,203	28.89%
Democratic	Natalie Davis	71,588	22.67%
Democratic	Marilyn Q. Bromberg	11,573	3.67%
Total votes		315,724	100.00%

Democratic primary runoff results by county Bedford: 50–60%; 60–70%; 70–80%; 80–90%; Browder: 50–60%; 60–70%; 70–80%; 80–90%

June 25 Democratic runoff results
Party	Candidate	Votes	%
Democratic	Roger Bedford	141,747	61.59%
Democratic	Glen Browder	88,415	38.41%
Total votes		230,162	100.00%

== Republican primary ==
=== Candidates ===
- Jimmy Blake, Birmingham city councilman
- Walter D. Clark, podiatrist and Vietnam veteran
- Albert Lipscomb, state senator
- Sid McDonald, former state senator
- Frank McRight, attorney and Democratic nominee for AL-01 in 1984
- Jeff Sessions, Alabama attorney general
- Charles Woods, businessman and perennial candidate

=== Results ===
Republican primary first round results by county Sessions: 20–30%; 30–40%; 40–50%; 50–60%; 60–70%; 70–80%; 80–90%; McDonald: 20–30%; 30–40%; 40–50%; 50–60%

June 4 Republican primary results
Party	Candidate	Votes	%
Republican	Jeff Sessions	82,373	37.81%
Republican	Sid McDonald	47,320	21.72%
Republican	Charles Woods	24,409	11.20%
Republican	Frank McRight	21,964	10.08%
Republican	Walter D. Clark	18,745	8.60%
Republican	Jimmy Blake	15,385	7.06%
Republican	Albert Lipscomb	7,672	3.52%
Total votes		217,868	100.00%

Republican primary runoff results by county Sessions: 50–60%; 60–70%; 70–80%; 80–90%; >90%; McDonald: 50–60%; 60–70%; 70–80%

June 25 Republican runoff results
Party	Candidate	Votes	%
Republican	Jeff Sessions	81,681	59.26%
Republican	Sid McDonald	56,156	40.74%
Total votes		137,837	100.00%

== General election ==
=== Candidates ===
- Roger Bedford (D), state senator
- Charles Hebner (NL), activist
- Jeff Sessions (R), attorney general of Alabama
- Mark Thornton (L), economist

=== Results ===
General election results
Party	Candidate	Votes	%
Republican	Jeff Sessions	786,436	52.45%
Democratic	Roger Bedford	681,651	45.46%
Libertarian	Mark Thornton	21,550	1.44%
Natural Law	Charles Hebner	9,123	0.61%
Write-in		633	0.04%
Total votes		1,499,393	100.00%
Republican gain from Democratic			

== See also ==
- 1996 United States Senate elections
