= Charles Langford =

American politician (1922–2007)

Member of the Alabama Senate from the 26th district
- In office November 9, 1983 – November 6, 2002
- Preceded by: Don Harrison
- Succeeded by: Quinton Ross

Member of the Alabama House of Representatives from the 77th district
- In office November 8, 1978 – November 9, 1983
- Preceded by: Rufus Lewis
- Succeeded by: John Buskey

Personal details
- Born: December 9, 1922 Montgomery, Alabama
- Died: February 11, 2007 (aged 84) Montgomery, Alabama
- Party: Democratic
- Education: Tennessee State University
- Profession: Attorney

Charles Douglas Langford (December 9, 1922 – February 11, 2007) was an Alabama state senator who represented Rosa Parks in the famous civil rights case of the 1960s. Attorney Langford served in the Alabama Legislature as a State Representative, District 77, Montgomery County, from 1976 to 1983, and as a State Senator, District 26, Montgomery County, from 1983 to 2002. He was the sixth child of Nathan G. and Lucy Brown Langford. Mr. Langford was one of two black lawyers in Montgomery at this time.

== Early education ==
Langford completed two years at Tuskegee Institute before being drafted in the US Army during World War II, where he served overseas as a truck driver in the European Theater Operation. Langford had an honorable discharge from the Army in 1946. Langford earned his law degree at The Catholic University of America. He had earned his undergraduate degree at Tennessee State University in 1948. He was a partner in the law firm of Gray, Langford, Sapp, McGowan, Gray and Nathanson.

== Cases ==
Langford was also a lawyer who represented civil rights activist Rosa Parks subsequent to her arrest on December 1, 1955, for refusing to give up her seat to a white man on a Montgomery bus. In 1993, representing a group of black legislators, Langford helped end the flying of a Confederate battle flag from the dome of the State Capitol in Montgomery. In 1964 he represented Arlam Carr in a lawsuit against Montgomery's Board of Education that led to the desegregation of the city's public schools.

== Later life ==
In 1953, he was admitted to the Alabama State Bar, and opened his law office on Monroe Street in Montgomery. Langford stayed in Montgomery and continued to represent local African-Americans in civil rights cases. He served five terms in the Senate before retiring in 2002. Survivors include a sister, Mattie Lee Langford. Langford died on February 11, 2007, at his home in Montgomery. He was 84. Langford died in his sleep, his niece Audrey Anderson told The Associated Press.
