= Lance Bell =

American politician (born 1987)

Member of the Alabama Senate from the 11th district
- Incumbent
- Assumed office November 4, 2022
- Preceded by: Jim McClendon

Personal details
- Party: Republican
- Website: https://alsenaterepublicans.org/representatives/0011-jim-mcclendon/

Lance Bell is a politician from St. Clair County, Alabama.

== Political career ==
Bell has been involved in politics for most of the last decade. From 2015-2021 he was the Chairman of the St. Clair County Republican Party. And he currently serves as the incumbent GOP chairmen for the 3rd congressional district of Alabama.

His senatorial career started in 2022 when he ran for the seat left open by Jim McClendon's retirement. He won the republican primary easily with 73% of the vote, and then faced no major challenger in the general election.

Bell served as an elector pledged to Donald Trump and JD Vance in the 2024 Presidential Election.

== Electoral history ==
Republican primary for Alabama State Senate District 11, 2022
Party	Candidate	Votes	%
Republican	Lance Bell	12,586	73.0%
Republican	Michael Wright	4,663	27.0%

General election for Alabama State Senate District 11, 2022
Party	Candidate	Votes	%
Republican	Lance Bell	33,505	98.4%
Other	Write in	543	1.6%
