= Senator Teague =

Senator Teague may refer to:

- John Teague (American politician) (1944–2023), Alabama State Senate
- Larry Teague (fl. 1990s–present), Arkansas State Senate
