= Thurgood Marshall High School (Alabama) =

High school in Alabama

Coordinates: 31.4232°N 86.9515°W

- Evergreen, Conecuh County, Alabama; United States

Information
- Former name: Conecuh County Training School

Thurgood Marshall High School was a school for African American students in Evergreen, Alabama. It was renamed from Conecuh County Training School after Thurgood Marshall, who was appointed to the U.S. Supreme Court. It was turned into a middle school in 1970. Its principal O. F. Frazier wrote that he was removed for a white principal and then let go.

A photo of four teachers from the school is extant.

Rufus A. Lewis taught for a year at the school.

It was one of the county training schools established. County training schools received funding support from the Slater Fund.

Studies were done at the school and of its graduates.

== Alumni ==
- Joe L. Reed
- Reba Mixon Barley
