= Alabama's 26th Senate district =

Alabama's 26th State Senate district
Senator
Kirk Hatcher; D–Montgomery
- Demographics: 22.5% White; 69.8% Black; 4.5% Hispanic; 1.1% Asian
- Population (2022): 147,087

Alabama's 26th Senate district is one of 35 districts in the Alabama Senate. The district has been represented by Kirk Hatcher since a special election in 2021.

== Geography ==
Election	Map	Counties in District
2026; 2022		Portion of Montgomery
2018		Portion of Montgomery
2014		Portion of Montgomery
2010; 2006; 2002		Portion of Montgomery

== Election history ==
=== Elections in the 2020s ===
Alabama Senate election, 2022: Senate District 26
Party	Candidate	Votes	%	±%
Democratic	Kirk Hatcher (Incumbent)	25,901	98.47	+20.14
Write-in		403	1.53	+1.45
Majority		25,498	96.94	+40.15
Turnout		26,304		
Democratic hold				

Alabama Senate District 26 special election - 2 March 2021
Party	Candidate	Votes	%	±%
Democratic	Kirk Hatcher	4,565	78.33	−1.84
Republican	William Green	1,255	21.53	+1.81
Write-in		8	0.14	+0.03
Majority		3,310	56.79	−3.66
Turnout		5,828		
Democratic hold				

=== Elections in the 2010s ===
Alabama Senate election, 2018: Senate District 26
Party	Candidate	Votes	%	±%
Democratic	David Burkette (Incumbent)	31,973	80.17	−9.14
Republican	D. J. Johnson	7,863	19.72	+9.35
Write-in		45	0.11	-0.21
Majority		24,110	60.45	−18.49
Turnout		39,881		
Democratic hold				

Alabama Senate District 26 special election - 5 May 2018
Party	Candidate	Votes	%	±%
Democratic	David Burkette	3,876	89.31	−9.87
Republican	D. J. Johnson	450	10.37	+10.37
Write-in		14	0.32	-0.50
Majority		3,426	78.94	−19.41
Turnout		4,340		
Democratic hold				

Alabama Senate election, 2014: Senate District 26
Party	Candidate	Votes	%	±%
Democratic	Quinton Ross (Incumbent)	25,166	99.18	+1.28
Write-in		209	0.82	-1.28
Majority		24,957	98.35	+2.55
Turnout		25,375		
Democratic hold				

Alabama Senate election, 2010: Senate District 26
Party	Candidate	Votes	%	±%
Democratic	Quinton Ross (Incumbent)	28,703	97.90	−1.19
Write-in		615	2.10	+1.19
Majority		28,088	95.80	−2.38
Turnout		29,318		
Democratic hold				

=== Elections in the 2000s ===
Alabama Senate election, 2006: Senate District 26
Party	Candidate	Votes	%	±%
Democratic	Quinton Ross (Incumbent)	23,652	99.09	+26.97
Write-in		217	0.91	+0.90
Majority		23,435	98.18	+53.92
Turnout		23,869		
Democratic hold				

Alabama Senate election, 2002: Senate District 26
Party	Candidate	Votes	%	±%
Democratic	Quinton Ross	23,587	72.12	−8.05
Republican	Beverly Ray Love	9,113	27.87	+8.12
Write-in		4	0.01	-0.07
Majority		14,474	44.26	−16.16
Turnout		32,704		
Democratic hold				

=== Elections in the 1990s ===
Alabama Senate election, 1998: Senate District 26
Party	Candidate	Votes	%	±%
Democratic	Charles Langford (Incumbent)	22,446	80.17	−19.79
Republican	Jimmy D. Sanders	5,529	19.75	+19.75
Write-in		22	0.08	+0.04
Majority		16,917	60.42	
Turnout		27,997		
Democratic hold				

Alabama Senate election, 1994: Senate District 26
Party	Candidate	Votes	%	±%
Democratic	Charles Langford (Incumbent)	18,025	99.96	−0.02
Write-in		7	0.04	+0.02
Majority		18,018	99.92	−0.04
Turnout		18,032		
Democratic hold				

Alabama Senate election, 1990: Senate District 26
Party	Candidate	Votes	%	±%
Democratic	Charles Langford (Incumbent)	21,438	99.98	+0.02
Write-in		4	0.02	-0.02
Majority		21,434	99.96	−0.04
Turnout		21,442		
Democratic hold				

=== Elections in the 1980s ===
Alabama Senate election, 1986: Senate District 26
Party	Candidate	Votes	%	±%
Democratic	Charles Langford (Incumbent)	23,272	100.00	
Majority		23,272	100.00	
Turnout		23,272		
Democratic hold				

Alabama Senate election, 1983: Senate District 26
Party	Candidate	Votes	%	±%
Democratic	Charles Langford	9,840	100.00	+0.01
Majority		9,840	100.00	+0.02
Turnout		9,840		
Democratic hold				

Alabama Senate election, 1982: Senate District 26
Party	Candidate	Votes	%	±%
Democratic	Don Harrison (Incumbent)	20,680	99.99	
Write-in		2	0.01	
Majority		20,678	99.98	
Turnout		20,682		
Democratic hold				

== District officeholders ==
Senators take office at midnight on the day of their election.

- Kirk Hatcher (2021–present)
- David Burkette (2018–2020)
- Quinton Ross (2002–2018)
- Charles Langford (1983–2002)
- Don Harrison (1978–1983)
- Jerry Powell (1974–1978)
- Larry Register (1970–1974)
- J. L. Adams (1966–1970)
- Ed Reynolds (1962–1966)
- L. K. Andrews (1958–1962)
- Sam M. Engelhardt Jr. (1954–1958)
