= Eric Major =

American politician from Alabama

Member of the Alabama House of Representatives from the 55th district
- In office January 3, 1999 – January 3, 2007
- Preceded by: Warren Minnifield
- Succeeded by: Rod Scott

Personal details
- Party: Democratic
- Education: University of Alabama at Birmingham (B.S.)

Eric Major (born April 6, 1968) is an American politician and educator from the state of Alabama. A member of the Democratic Party, Major served in the Alabama House of Representatives from 1999 to 2007.

== Professional career ==
Major owns a public affairs consulting firm and has also worked as a business development and government relations consultant.

== Political career ==
Major first ran for the Alabama House in 1994, challenging incumbent Warren Minnifield in the Democratic primary. Major forced Minnifield into a runoff, but lost by a 51–49 margin. Major challenged Minnifield again in 1998, and again the two went to a primary runoff; this time, Major prevailed by a 54–46 margin, going on to win the general election. Major was re-elected in 2002 but lost his bid for a third term in 2006, suffering a 54–46 defeat against Rod Scott in the Democratic primary runoff. After leaving office, Major mounted unsuccessful bids for several offices, including state senate, Jefferson County Treasurer, and Jefferson County Commission.

== Personal life ==
In 2004, Major was arrested on charges of physically assaulting his ex-fiancée. He was eventually acquitted on the charges. Major sued the city of Birmingham, alleging that his civil rights were violated by the arrest. A judge ruled in his favor, awarding him a $500,000 settlement. Major claimed the domestic abuse allegations were orchestrated by his political rivals.

Major lives in Fairfield.
