= Gary Aldridge =

American state legislator

Gary Aldridge was a lawyer and state legislator in Alabama. He worked in Birmingham.

He graduated from the University of Alabama School of Law in 1978. He was married to Marsha White Aldridge. He served as a municipal judge in Hartselle, Alabama. He also worked in Decatur, Alabama. He co-sponsored the Martin-Aldridge Act, a reform of Alabama's child abuse and neglect laws.

He went missing on July 14, 1998 after a rafting accident in Alaska aged 47. A couple days later, his body was found on a small island. The accident occurred on American Creek in Katmai National Park. Senator Frank Ellis was also on the trip.

== See also ==
- Alabama's 3rd Senate district
