= Rod Scott =

American politician

Member of the Alabama House of Representatives from the 55th district
- In office 2006 – November 10, 2022
- Preceded by: Eric Major
- Succeeded by: Fred Plump

Personal details
- Born: November 9, 1958 (age 67)
- Party: Democratic
- Profession: professor

Roderick 'Rod' Hampton Scott (born November 9, 1958) is an American politician. He was a member of the Alabama House of Representatives, serving from 2006 to 2022, representing the 55th House District, that includes Fairfield, Elyton, and Birmingham. As a member of the Democratic party, he was the ranking minority member of the Education Policy Committee, Fiscal Responsibility Committee, and Ways and Means Education Committee of the Alabama State Legislature.

He holds a B.A. in Economics from Yale University and an MBA from the Amos Tuck School of Business Administration at Dartmouth College. He has been a professor at Miles College, and is a member of Phi Beta Sigma fraternity.

In 2022, Scott was defeated in the Democratic primary for the 55th district, losing to Fred Plump, who succeeded him as representative.

After leaving the legislature, he was appointed Gadsden director of planning.
