= John Rogers (Alabama politician) =

American politician (born 1940)

Member of the Alabama House of Representatives from the 52nd district
- In office November 3, 1982 – March 13, 2024
- Succeeded by: Kelvin Datcher

Personal details
- Born: John Westley Rogers Jr. December 16, 1940 (age 85) Birmingham, Alabama, U.S.
- Party: Democratic

John Westley Rogers Jr. (born December 16, 1940) is an American politician from the state of Alabama. A member of the Democratic Party, Rogers served in the Alabama House of Representatives, representing the 52nd district.

== Early life ==
Rogers is from Birmingham, Alabama. He has a bachelor's degree from Tennessee State University, a master's degree from the University of Alabama, and an associate's degree from the University of Alabama at Birmingham.

== Political career ==
Rogers was elected to the Alabama House of Representatives in 1982. In 1988 he joined an effort to remove the Confederate flag from the Alabama Capitol building. Rogers personally opposes abortion but represented a district that supported abortion rights, and voted accordingly.

=== Abortion comments controversy ===
On May 1, 2019, Rogers stated during a filibuster in opposition to a bill challenging Roe v. Wade, that would make performing or attempting to perform an abortion in Alabama a felony:

“Some children are just unwanted. You either kill them now or you kill them later in the electric chair.”

“Some parents can’t handle a child with problems. It could be retarded. It might have no arms and no legs.”

Rogers' comments were widely decried in the media, by conservative pundits, and by the Alabama House Democratic Caucus. Senator Doug Jones, a friend of Rogers', called him to let him know that the comments were hurtful and that he would condemn them publicly.

Also criticised by Donald Trump Jr., Rogers stated the following day, May 2, 2019, that he should have been aborted and that there was something mentally wrong with him. Rogers later apologized for using the word "retarded" in his criticism of Trump Jr.

== Indictment ==
In September 2023, Rogers was indicted on two counts of obstruction of justice related to an investigation of the defrauding of the Jefferson County Community Service Fund. The same investigation previously led to the indictment and resignation of fellow state representative Fred Plump. Rogers denied any wrongdoing and said that he would "look forward to a court date". Rogers later pled guilty and resigned from the Alabama House effective March 13, 2024.

== Personal life ==
Rogers is Catholic.
