= Jim Preuitt =

American politician (1935–2021)

Member of the Alabama Senate from the 11th district
- In office November 4, 1998 – November 3, 2010
- Preceded by: Dell Hill
- Succeeded by: Jerry L. Fielding
- In office November 5, 1986 – November 9, 1994
- Preceded by: John Teague
- Succeeded by: Dell Hill

Personal details
- Born: James Edward Preuitt; July 19, 1935 Moulton, Alabama, U.S.
- Died: September 19, 2021 (aged 86) Talladega, Alabama, U.S.
- Party: Democratic (until 2010); Republican (2010–2021)
- Spouse: Rona Millsap
- Occupation: Car dealer; politician

James Edward Preuitt (July 19, 1935 – September 19, 2021) was an American politician and Democratic member of the Alabama Senate, representing the 11th District from 1995 to 2010. Previously he was a member of the Alabama House of Representatives.

On November 13, 2007, the body of his grandson (missing for eight days) was found in Villa Rica, Georgia.

In April 2010 Preuitt left the Democratic Party becoming a Republican. He died on September 19, 2021, at the age of 86.
