= Quinton Ross (politician) =

American politician

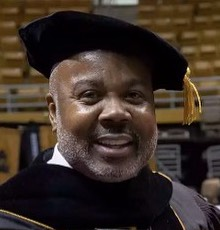
- Ross at Alabama State University's graduation, 2019

Member of the Alabama Public Service Commission
- Designate
- Assuming office January 18, 2027
- Governor: Tommy Tuberville
- Succeeding: Seat established

President of Alabama State University
- Incumbent
- Assumed office October 3, 2017
- Preceded by: Gwendolyn Boyd
- Succeeded by: TBD

Minority Leader of the Alabama Senate
- In office November 2014 – October 2, 2017
- Preceded by: Roger Bedford Jr.
- Succeeded by: Billy Beasley

Member of the Alabama Senate from the 26th district
- In office November 6, 2002 – October 2, 2017
- Preceded by: Charles Langford
- Succeeded by: David Burkette

Personal details
- Born: October 30, 1968 (age 58) Mobile, Alabama, U.S.
- Party: Democratic
- Spouse: J. Kelley
- Children: 2
- Education: Alabama State University (BS, MA, EdD)

Academic background
- Thesis: The Alabama State Senate's Attitude about the No Child Left Behind Act of 2001 (2010)
- Doctoral advisor: Robert Beach

Academic work
- Institutions: Alabama State University

Quinton T. Ross Jr. (born October 30, 1968) is an American politician and university administrator who is the 15th president of Alabama State University, a Historically Black College (HBCU). A Democrat, Ross served as a member of the Alabama Senate from 2002 to 2017 and served as the Minority Leader from 2014 to 2017.

== Early life and education ==
Ross was born in Mobile, Alabama. His parents, Quinton Ross, Sr., and Shirley A. Ross, met as students at Alabama State, and recruited to teach in Pontiac, Michigan, where Quinton, Jr. was raised. He attended Kennedy School (Pontiac, MI) and Pontiac Northern High School.

For college, Ross followed in his parents' footsteps and attended Alabama State, where he received his BS in 1992, Political Science; MA, Education in 1995; and EdD, Educational Leadership, Policy and Law in 2010.

== Career ==
=== Professional experience ===
Ross has held several positions in education. He was the director of adult education consortium at H. Councill Trenholm State Community College.

He served as principal of Booker T. Washington Magnet High School, Montgomery, "the first Black principal of a magnet high school in Montgomery.”

Since 2017, he has served as president of Alabama State University.

In 2024, he was named to the National Collegiate Athletic Association (NCAA) Division I Board of Directors.`

=== Political experience ===
He was a senator in the Alabama State Senate. He served on the following legislative committees: Commerce, Transportation, and Utilities; Education (vice chair); Tourism and Marketing; and Veterans and Military Affairs.

Ross was found not guilty of corruption in 2011.

== Affiliations ==
Ross has been a member for the following organizations:

- Member, Council for Leaders in Alabama Schools
- Member, National Association of Secondary School Principals
- Member, NCAA Committee on Women’s Athletics, 2025
- Member, Omega Psi Phi
- Member, President’s Board of Advisors on Historically Black Colleges and Universities (HBCUs), appointed by President Biden, 2022

== Personal life ==
Ross is married to J. Kelley, and together they have two children named Quinmari and Quinton. He is a member of Hutchinson Missionary Baptist Church.

Alabama Senate
Preceded by Roger Bedford Jr.	Minority Leader of the Alabama Senate; 2014–2017	Succeeded by Billy Beasley
Political offices
New seat	Member of the Alabama Public Service Commission; Taking office 2027	Designate
