= David Burkette =

American politician

David Burkette is an American politician who represented Alabama's 26th Senate district in the Alabama Senate as a Democrat from 2018 to 2020. He resigned in 2020 after being convicted of misdemeanor campaign violation charges, he was succeeded in a special election by Kirk Hatcher.

== Career ==
Burkette previously served as a member of the Montgomery City Council. He is also a retired educator.

In 2017, Burkette filed to run for the Senate seat vacated by Quinton Ross, who resigned to become president of Alabama State University. Burkette won the special election after winning the Democratic nomination. He ran again in the general election, winning re-election.

Burkette resigned from the Senate on September 1, 2020, facing investigations over campaign finance violations relating to two non profits who could not document the use of part of their funding. On September 3, he was charged with depositing $3,625 in campaign contributions into his personal account while running for Montgomery City Council in 2015 and 2016.

In 2020 he guilty to a misdemeanor campaign violations of less than $4,000 and in a sealed plea agreement, resigned his office.

== Electoral history ==
2018 Alabama Senate 26th district special election
Party	Candidate	Votes	%
Democratic	David Burkette	3,876	89.3%
Republican	D.J. Johnson	450	10.4%
Write-in		14	0.3%
Total votes		4,340	100%
Democratic hold			

2018 Alabama Senate 26th district election
Party	Candidate	Votes	%
Democratic	David Burkette (incumbent)	31,973	80.171%
Republican	D.J. Johnson	7,863	19.716%
Write-in		45	0.113%
Total votes		39,881	100.0%
Democratic hold			
