= Jim McClendon =

American politician

Member of the Alabama Senate from the 11th district
- In office November 5, 2014 – November 9, 2022
- Preceded by: Jerry Fielding
- Succeeded by: Lance Bell

Member of the Alabama House of Representatives from the 50th district
- In office 2002 – November 5, 2014
- Preceded by: Marilyn Quarles
- Succeeded by: Jim Hill

Personal details
- Born: January 10, 1943 (age 83) Mobile, Alabama, U.S.
- Party: Republican
- Spouse: Ellen
- Children: 2
- Education: Birmingham–Southern College; University of Houston
- Profession: Optometrist

Jim McClendon (born January 10, 1943) is an American optometrist and politician. A Republican, he was a member of the Alabama State Senate from the 11th District and was previously a member of the Alabama House of Representatives, where he represented the 50th District from 2002 to 2014.

== Early life and education ==
McClendon was born in Mobile, studied as an undergraduate at Birmingham–Southern College, and earned a bachelor's degree and a Ph.D. from the University of Houston. He served in the United States Navy Medical Service Corps in Vietnam from 1968 to 1971.

== Career ==
After his military service, McClendon taught clinical optometry at the University of Alabama, Birmingham and then entered private practice. He has been president of the Alabama Optometric Association.

== Political career ==
In November 2002 McClendon defeated Democrat Marilyn Quarles in the 50th District for election to the Alabama House of Representatives; he represented the district for three terms, until 2014. In November 2014 he was elected to represent the 11th District in the State Senate, and has held that position since January 2015; he was re-elected in 2018.

In 2016 and 2019, he put forward a state lottery, a perennial legislative proposal that would require an amendment to the state constitution.

In May 2019, he voted for the Human Life Protection Act, which makes abortion a crime in the state at any stage in a pregnancy, with no exemptions for rape or incest. Later that month, McClendon said on the Matt and Aunie morning radio show that cancer patients can just buy marijuana on the street if they need it.

== Personal life ==
McClendon is married and lives on a farm in St. Clair Springs.
