= Arthur Orr =

American politician

Member of the Alabama Senate from the 3rd district
- Incumbent
- Assumed office November 8, 2006
- Preceded by: Tommy Ed Roberts

Personal details
- Born: May 25, 1964 (age 62) Danville, Alabama, U.S.
- Party: Republican
- Spouse: Amy Wallace Bethshares
- Children: 2
- Education: Wake Forest University (BA); University of Alabama, Tuscaloosa (JD)
- Website: Official website

Arthur Orr (born May 25, 1964) is an American politician serving in the Alabama Senate and as the Executive Vice President for Cook's Pest Control. First elected in 2006, he is currently Chairman of the Senate Finance and Taxation Education Committee. He previously served as Chairman of the Senate Finance and Taxation General Fund Committee. Born in Decatur Alabama, Orr is an alumnus of Wake Forest University, where he received a Bachelor of Arts, and the University of Alabama School of Law, where he received a Juris Doctor degree.

Orr is a member of the American Bar Association, Alabama State Bar, and Alabama Law Institute.

== Early career ==
Orr served two years in Nepal as a volunteer with the Peace Corps. With the financial help of friends and family in the U.S., Orr used his legal and language training to establish a college scholarship program to benefit female village students. To date, over 200 village students have benefited by attending college and seeking the opportunities an education provides. After completing his commitment, he returned to Decatur, Alabama where he joined the law firm of Harris, Caddell and Shanks, P.C. and served as president of several non-profit organizations. He was selected as the Citizen of the Year by the Decatur Rotary Club and received other leadership awards from various organizations, including carrying the 1996 Olympic Torch. Orr then served in Bangladesh as a new country developer, and in the Pacific Ocean region of Asia with Habitat for Humanity International as a staff attorney. Orr returned home to work for Cook's Pest Control where he would serve as Executive Vice President.

== Political career ==
In 2006 he ran for the Alabama State Senate. Orr won both the Republican primary and later the general election. After winning a second term, Orr chaired the Senate Finance and Taxation General Fund committee. He now chairs the Senate Finance and Taxation Education committee. He was instrumental in the creation and location of the Robotics Technology Park in Limestone County, the Alabama School of Cyber Technology and Engineering in Madison County and the Alabama Center for the Arts in Morgan County. Orr has also been a part of business recruitment teams that led to billions in economic investment and thousands of jobs over the three counties he represents.

In 2016 Orr sponsored an anti-BDS bill to prevent the state from entering into contracts with companies that boycott Israel. Orr said that he sponsored the bill at the request of Israel supporters who were concerned about the BDS movement. That same year, Orr also sponsored a senate resolution condemning the BDS movement.

== Board memberships ==
Orr was the Chairman of the Alabama Bicentennial Committee which brought . He serves, or has served as, president of the Community Foundation, the Decatur Rotary Club, Main Street Decatur and the Junior Chamber of Commerce chairman of the Calhoun College Foundation, the City Beautification Board and the Volunteer Center. Orr also sits on the board of the Community Free Clinic, which he helped found.

== Electoral history ==
=== 2018 ===
Alabama's 3rd State Senate district election, 2018
| Party | Candidate | Votes | % |
|---|---|---|---|
| Republican | Arthur Orr (incumbent) | 37,295 | 97.3 |
| Independent | Write-in | 1,021 | 2.7 |

=== 2014 ===
Alabama's 3rd State Senate district election, 2014
| Party | Candidate | Votes | % |
|---|---|---|---|
| Republican | Arthur Orr (incumbent) | 26,906 | 98.5 |
| Independent | Write-in | 412 | 1.5 |

=== 2010 ===
Alabama's 3rd State Senate district election, 2010
| Party | Candidate | Votes | % |
|---|---|---|---|
| Republican | Arthur Orr (incumbent) | 24,769 | 98.9 |
| Independent | Write-in | 429 | 1.1 |

=== 2006 ===
Alabama's 3rd State Senate district Republican primary, 2006
| Party | Candidate | Votes | % |
|---|---|---|---|
| Republican | Arthur Orr | 14,231 | 84.0 |
| Republican | Hubert M. Porter | 2,702 | 16.0 |

Alabama's 3rd State Senate district election, 2006
| Party | Candidate | Votes | % |
|---|---|---|---|
| Republican | Arthur Orr | 24,769 | 62.3 |
| Democratic | Bobby Day | 14,923 | 37.5 |
| Independent | Write-in | 85 | 0.2 |
