= Tommy Ed Roberts =

American politician

Tommy Ed Roberts (October 19, 1940 – March 1, 2014) was an American politician and businessman. He served in the Alabama House of Representatives and the Alabama Senate.

From Hartselle, Alabama, he graduated from Hartselle High School. Roberts served in the United States Army Reserve and the Alabama National Guard. He attended Jacksonville State University, Rochester Institute of Technology, and University of Oklahoma. He owned a men's clothing store in Decatur, Alabama and was President and CEO of the Morgan County Economic Development Association.

== Political career ==
In 1974, he began serving in the Alabama House of Representatives, and then in 1994, he moved to the Alabama State Senate. He died in Hartselle, Alabama in 2014.
