= Tom Butler (Alabama politician) =

American politician (born 1944)

Member of the Alabama Senate from the 2nd district
- Incumbent
- Assumed office November 7, 2018
- Preceded by: Bill Holtzclaw
- In office November 9, 1994 – November 3, 2010
- Preceded by: Jim Smith
- Succeeded by: Bill Holtzclaw

Member of the Alabama House of Representatives from the 6th district
- In office November 9, 1983 – November 9, 1994
- Preceded by: Max Newman
- Succeeded by: Lee Jorgensen

Member of the Alabama House of Representatives from the 17th district
- In office November 3, 1982 – November 9, 1983
- Preceded by: Jim Smith
- Succeeded by: Jack Lauderdale

Personal details
- Born: Thomas Wayne Butler; April 9, 1944 (age 82) Huntsville, Alabama, U.S.
- Party: Republican (since 2011); Democratic (before 2011)
- Spouse: Karen
- Profession: pharmacist, Medicare Health Plan manager

Thomas Wayne Butler (born April 9, 1944) is a politician, and member of the Alabama Senate. He represents the 2nd District as a member of the Republican Party. Senate District 2 encompasses east Limestone County and western Madison County. It includes the cities of Athens, Huntsville and Madison.

== Biography ==
Prior to his term in the Alabama Senate, Butler served in the Alabama House of Representatives from 1982 through 1994.

Butler graduated from the University of Alabama and then from Auburn University. He works as a pharmacist and health underwriter. He is a member of Optimist International, the North Alabama Health Underwriters Association, and the Alabama Pharmaceutical Association.

Butler was an early supporter of making automated external heart defibrillators (AED) widely available in Alabama. He sponsored legislation to place such devices in all Alabama public schools.

Butler was the original sponsor of the Anti-Obscenity Enforcement Act of 1998, a statute that prohibits the sale of sex toys. Originally intended to prohibit nude dancing, the statute has subsequently become the target of controversy and litigation.

Butler sponsored and helped pass the Dixon-Butler Permanent Contract Review Act, which created a Contract Review Permanent Legislative Oversight Committee to review certain state contracts. This legislation aimed to ensure that ethical standards were upheld in state contracts issued by the Administrative branch. Butler served as chair, and vice chair, of this oversight committee.

Butler sponsored legislation to construct two State Veterans Nursing Homes (in Huntsville and Bay Minette). He worked to fund the Veterans Memorial in Birmingham, the Veteran's Museum and Archives in Athens, the establishment of the Veterans Living Legacy at the American Village at Montevallo, and the creation of Alabama's Veterans Assistance Fund.

Butler authored legislation that allowed the city of Madison to establish its own school system. This system has gained national attention for some of its schools.

Butler served on several committees during his House and Senate terms. His Senate assignments included the following:

- Agriculture, Conservation and Forestry Committee, Alabama Senate
- Children, Youth Affairs, and Human Resources Committee, Alabama Senate Chairperson
- Commerce, Transportation, and Utilities Committee, Alabama Senate
- Finance and Taxation Education Committee, Alabama Senate
- Finance and Taxation General Fund, Alabama Senate
- Health Committee, Alabama Senate Deputy Chairperson
- Local Legislation No. 1 Committee, Alabama Senate
- Industrial Development and Recruitment Committee, Alabama Senate
- Rules Committee, Alabama Senate

In May 2019, he voted to make abortion a crime at any stage in a pregnancy, with no exemptions for cases of rape or incest.

In March 2019, he voted to increase gasoline taxes by 10 cents per gallon over three years, up to 28 cents per gallon an effective tax increase of 55% over the previous rate of 18 cents per gallon.

In March 2020, he voted against the legalization of medical cannabis. The bill passed the Senate 22–11.

== See also ==
- List of American politicians who switched parties in office
