= Ino, Alabama =

Unincorporated community in Alabama, United States

- Unincorporated community
- Location within Alabama Location within the United States
- Coordinates: 31°16′17″N 86°05′41″W
- Country: United States
- State: Alabama
- County: Coffee
- Elevation: 312 ft (95 m)
- Time zone: UTC-6 (Central (CST))
  - Summer (DST): UTC-5 (CDT)
- Area code: 334

Ino is an unincorporated community in Coffee County, Alabama, United States.

== History ==
Local tradition holds that the first postmaster assembled a group of people to suggest a name. All were talking at the same time, and one person kept saying "I know." The group proposed to call the post office "I know", but spell it Ino. The post office was established in 1894, and remained in operation until it was discontinued in 1907.
