= Bill Holtzclaw =

American politician

Member of the Alabama Senate from the 2nd district
- In office November 8, 2010 – November 7, 2018
- Preceded by: Tom Butler
- Succeeded by: Tom Butler

Personal details
- Born: May 12, 1964 (age 62) Elaine, Arkansas, United States
- Spouse: Pam Holtzclaw
- Education: Athens State University

William Lovette Holtzclaw (born May 12, 1964) is an American Republican politician. He has served as a member of the Alabama State Senate from the 2nd District from November 8, 2010 to November 7, 2018.

== Early life ==
William Lovette Holtzclaw was born on May 12, 1964, in Elaine, Arkansas. He attended Jonesboro High School in Jonesboro, Arkansas. He graduated from Athens State University, where he received a Bachelor of Science. He served in the United States Marine Corps from 1983 to 2003.

== Career ==
Holtzclaw served in the U.S. Marine Corps until 2003. He served in the Operation Desert Storm in Iraq in 1991 and later in the Operation Restore Hope in Mogadishu, Somalia in 1992–1993. He also served by working at the Marine Corps Ammunition School at Redstone Arsenal near Huntsville, Alabama. In 2006, he worked for Wachovia Securities.

In 2010, Holtzclaw was elected to the 2nd district of the Alabama State Senate and reelected for a second term in 2014.

== Personal life ==
Holtzclaw is married to Pam, his high school sweetheart, and they have two children. They live in Madison, Alabama and attend Asbury United Methodist Church.
