= Larry Stutts =

American politician

Member of the Alabama Senate from the 6th district
- Incumbent
- Assumed office November 5, 2014
- Preceded by: Roger Bedford Jr.

Personal details
- Born: Larry Collins Stutts; May 1954 (age 72) Sheffield, Alabama, U.S.
- Party: Republican
- Spouse: Jackie Stutts
- Children: 4
- Education: Auburn University
- Profession: Physician
- Website: Official website

Larry Collins Stutts (born May 1954) is a member of the Alabama Senate. He represents the 6th district, which includes Colbert, Franklin, and part of Limestone counties. He was first elected in 2014, beating incumbent Roger Bedford Jr.

== Biography ==
Before entering politics, Stutts graduated veterinary school in 1979 and moved to Columbus, Georgia to practice. He soon moved back to his hometown of Cherokee, Alabama. He later graduated from the College of Medicine at the University of South Alabama and began to practice obstetrics and gynecology. According to his official website, he has delivered over ten thousand babies.

In 2015, Stutts sponsored a "maternity stay" bill in the Alabama Senate that would repeal a law inspired by the 1998 death of one of his patients, only to renege after public backlash & several articles being published exposing his connection to the law. He was never found criminally or civilly liable for her death, but settled with the family of the deceased outside of court.

== Political career ==
Stutts, a Republican, campaigned against incumbent Senator Roger Bedford, a Democrat, on a platform to repeal "Obamacare-style" regulations in Alabama. Following a recount, Stutts won by a margin of about 70 votes.

Alabama State Senate District 6, General Election, 2014
Party	Candidate	Votes	%
Republican	Larry Stutts	17,641	50.06%
Democratic	Roger Bedford Jr.	17,574	49.87%
Independent	Write Ins	27	0.07%
Majority		67	0.19%
Total votes		35,242	100.00%

In 2015, Stutts introduced a bill to repeal two laws, the first relating to notifying patients of dense breast tissue following a mammogram and the second requiring insurance companies to provide mandatory minimum hospitalization time following a woman giving birth, 48 hours for vaginal delivery and 96 hours for cesarean section. This second law, commonly referred to as Rose's Law, was unanimously passed by the Alabama Legislature following the 1998 death of 36 year old Rose Church ten days after she had given birth while attended by Stutts. She was discharged from Helen Keller Hospital in Sheffield, AL only 36 hours after giving birth at the insistence of her insurance provider. Her autopsy revealed that she had developed severe internal bleeding and that part of the placenta had been left in her womb. The attempted appeal of Rose's Law made national news following disclosure that Church had been Stutts' patient at the time of her death. Stutts withdrew the bill from consideration, stating "neither the bill nor today's decision is related to any patient case I have had during my medical career."

In May 2019, he voted to make abortion a crime at any stage in a pregnancy, with no exemptions for cases of rape or incest.

In 2026, Stutts announced a pilot program to strengthen prison oversight. It was later revealed that Stutts’ brother-in-law was sentenced to 12 years in prison on one count of sexual abuse of a child less than 12 years old.
