= Jerry L. Fielding =

American politician

Member of the Alabama Senate from the 11th district
- In office November 3, 2010 – November 5, 2014
- Preceded by: Jim Preuitt
- Succeeded by: Jim McClendon

Personal details
- Born: Jerry Leonard Fielding; May 9, 1947 (age 79) Richville, Alabama, U.S.
- Party: Republican (2012–present); Democratic (until 2012)
- Education: Faulkner University (JD)
- Occupation: Lawyer; politician

Jerry Leonard Fielding (born May 9, 1947) is an American politician. From 2010 to 2014, he was a Republican member of the Alabama Senate for the 11th district, encompassing Calhoun, Coosa, Elmore and Talladega Counties.

== Biography ==
=== Early life ===
Jerry L. Fielding was born on May 9, 1947, in Richville, Coosa County, Alabama. He graduated from Auburn University in Auburn, Alabama and received a J.D. from the Thomas Goode Jones School of Law of Faulkner University in Montgomery, Alabama.

=== Career ===
He served as a district judge. He was elected to the Alabama Senate as a Democrat in 2010 but joined the Republican Party in 2012. In December 2013, he suggested proposing a resolution in the state legislature to support Duck Dynasty's patriarch Phil Robertson, who had gotten worldwide attention for his comments in a December 2013 interview that were seen as homophobic and racist.

=== Personal life ===
He is a Methodist.
