= Roger Bedford Jr. =

American politician (1956–2023)

Roger H. Bedford Jr.
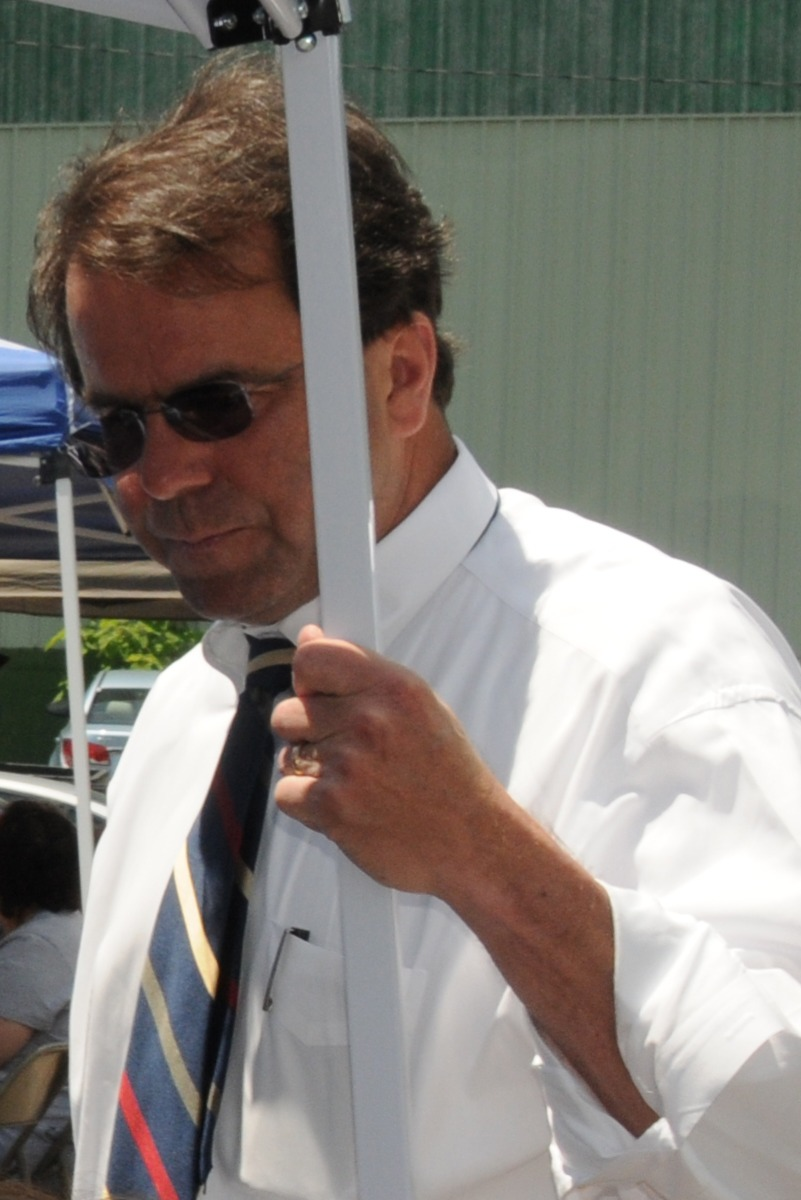

Member of the Alabama Senate
- In office November 9, 1994 – December 1, 2014
- Preceded by: George Bolling
- Succeeded by: Larry Stutts
- In office November 3, 1982 – November 3, 1990
- Preceded by: Charlie Britnell
- Succeeded by: George Bolling
- Constituency: 2nd district (1982–1983); 6th district (1983–1990)

Personal details
- Born: Roger Hugh Bedford Jr. July 2, 1956
- Died: October 10, 2023 (aged 67) Tuscaloosa, Alabama, U.S.
- Party: Democratic
- Spouse: Maudie Darby
- Children: 1
- Education: University of Alabama (BS); Samford University (JD)
- Profession: Attorney

Roger Hugh Bedford Jr. (July 2, 1956 – October 10, 2023) was an American lawyer and politician from Alabama. He was a Democratic member of the Alabama Senate, where he represented the 6th District from 1994 to 2014. He previously served from 1982 to 1990.

== Career ==
Bedford received his education at the University of Alabama, and his J.D. degree from Cumberland School of Law, Samford University. He was a Rotarian, and belonged to the Alabama State Bar, the Cattlemen's Association, the National Rifle Association, Ducks Unlimited, American Cancer Society, Executive member of the Boy Scouts of America, and the Greater Alabama Council.

In 1996 Bedford was the Democratic nominee for U.S. Senate, but was defeated by Republican Jeff Sessions. On April 2, 2009, multiple sources reported Senator Bedford had received encouragement to run for the Democratic nomination for Alabama governor in 2010. He did not enter the race. Later that month, on April 30, 2009, Bedford inserted a "poison pill" into a Senate bill that would have made it easier for U.S. soldiers serving overseas to vote, thereby causing it to fail. The poison pill "would prohibit a federal candidate or officeholder from transferring funds to a state campaign for office" and was widely seen as an attempt at preventing Artur Davis from transferring funds from his Congressional campaign to his state race for governor.

== Personal life and death ==
Bedford was married to the former Maudie Darby from Florence, Alabama, and they were the parents of one child.

Bedford died from cancer at his home in Tuscaloosa, on October 10, 2023, at the age of 67.

Alabama Senate
Preceded by Charlie Britnell	Member of the Alabama Senate from the 2nd district 1982–1984	Succeeded by Jim Smith
Preceded by Jim Smith	Member of the Alabama Senate from the 6th district 1984–1990	Succeeded by George Bolling
Preceded by George Bolling	Member of the Alabama Senate from the 6th district 1994–2014	Succeeded by Larry Stutts
Party political offices
Preceded by Howell Heflin	Democratic nominee for U.S. Senator from Alabama (Class 3); 1996	Succeeded by Susan Parker
