= Jimmy Holley =

American politician (1944–2024)

Jimmy W. Holley

Member of the Alabama Senate from the 31st district
- In office November 4, 1998 – November 8, 2022
- Preceded by: Dwight L. Adams

Member of the Alabama House of Representatives from the 91st district
- In office November 8, 1983 – November 9, 1994
- Preceded by: Frank P. White
- Succeeded by: Gareth Moore

Member of the Alabama House of Representatives from the 74th district
- In office November 6, 1974 – November 8, 1983
- Preceded by: District Created
- Succeeded by: Bob McKee

Personal details
- Born: July 30, 1944 Coffee County, Alabama, U.S.
- Died: November 4, 2024 (aged 80) Elba, Alabama, U.S.
- Party: Democratic (before 2008); Republican (after 2008)
- Spouse: Mary
- Profession: Educator, Troy University

Jimmy W. Holley (July 30, 1944 – November 4, 2024) was an American politician who served as a member of the Alabama Senate, representing the 31st District from 1998 to 2022. Previously he was a member of the Alabama House of Representatives from 1974 through 1994. Holley was a Democrat until January 10, 2008, when he announced he would become a Republican.

In May 2019, he voted to make abortion a crime at any stage in a pregnancy, with no exemptions for cases of rape or incest.

Holley died at a care facility in Elba, Alabama, on November 4, 2024, at the age of 80.
