= WWON =

WWON may refer to:

- WWON (AM), a radio station (930 AM) licensed to Waynesboro, Tennessee, United States
- WWON-FM, a radio station (100.7 FM) licensed to Waynesboro, Tennessee, United States
- WCXI, a radio station (1160 AM) licensed to Fenton, Michigan, United States, which used the call sign WWON from 1993 to 2000
- WWKX, a radio station (106.3 FM) licensed to Woonsocket, Rhode Island, United States, which used the call sign WWON-FM from 1949 to 1985
- WOON, a radio station (1240 AM) licensed to Woonsocket, Rhode Island, United States, which used the call sign WWON from 1946 to 1992
