= WLAY =

WLAY may refer to:

- WLAY (AM), a radio station (1450 AM) licensed to Muscle Shoals, Alabama, United States
- WLAY-FM, a radio station (100.1 FM) licensed to Littleville, Alabama, United States
- What I Like About You (TV series), a 2002-2006 The WB television series starring Jennie Garth and Amanda Bynes
