= Bob Albright =

American politician (1936–2023)

Member of the Alabama House of Representatives
- In office 1974–1986
- Preceded by: Phil Smith
- Succeeded by: Dewayne Freeman
- Constituency: 20th district (1974–1983); 21st district (1983–1986)

Personal details
- Born: Robert Earl Albright; April 9, 1936 Paint Rock, Alabama, U.S.
- Died: November 27, 2023 (aged 87) Florence, Alabama, U.S.
- Party: Democratic
- Spouse: Joan Hall (died 2022)
- Children: 3
- Education: Athens State University
- Profession: Teacher

Robert Earl Albright (April 9, 1936 – November 27, 2023) was an American politician who served in the Alabama House of Representatives from 1974 to 1986. A member of the Democratic Party, Albright represented the 20th and later the 21st district in the Huntsville area. He began his career as a schoolteacher.

== Early life and education ==
Robert Earl Albright was born on April 9, 1936, and was a native of Paint Rock, Alabama. His brother, Ray Albright, served in the Tennessee Senate. He graduated from Central High School and went on to serve in the U.S. Air Force. During his period of service he represented the United States Air Force Academy's Air Force Falcons in the national Golden Gloves amateur boxing tournament. Albright attained a degree from Athens State University, which he attended on the G.I. Bill from his service in the Air Force.

== Career ==
Albright worked as a biology teacher, sports coach and vocational counselor at schools for 25 years. While working in education, Albright was elected to the Alabama House of Representatives in 1974, representing the Huntsville, Alabama, area in the state house's 20th district. One of Albright's primary opponents, Marcus "Bulldog" Daniel, was a neighbor who lived on the same street as him. Albright and Daniel advanced to a runoff election, which Albright won with 56% of the vote to Daniel's 44%. Albright won in the general election with 70% of the vote against Republican nominee Bill Albritton, during an election cycle that "wiped out" Republicans in the state house, according to the Birmingham Post-Herald.

During his tenure, Albright was noted for his work in upholding the Voting Rights Act of 1965 in Huntsville, ensuring the city's compliance with the law, as well as pursuing equity in Alabama legislation. In 1976, Albright was part of successful opposition to the state budget proposed by Governor George Wallace, which Albright said pitted funding for state employees against education, at a time when both departments were in "dire need". Albright advocated for raising taxes to increase funding for both areas. Albright also worked to secure a state grant for video equipment at the media departments of the University of Alabama in Huntsville and Lee High School. In 1983, Albright was redistricted to the 21st district during a special legislative election. The district remained in the Huntsville area and Albright defeated Republican nominee Keith B. Wilson with 54% of the vote in the special election.

Albright served as a delegate from Alabama to the 1984 Democratic National Convention. In 1986, Albright lost a Democratic primary challenge to former representative Dewayne Freeman, unseating him. In 1990, Albright attempted to mount a comeback when he challenged state senator Bill Smith in the Democratic primary. Albright was financially supported by the Alabama Education Association and a trial lawyers' lobbying group with over $42,000 to his campaign, but lost the election to Smith. After leaving the Alabama Legislature, Albright worked in building engines and was a frequent speaker on civics at Scouting activities.

== Personal life and death ==
Albright was married to Joan Hall, who died in 2022; the couple had three children together: Robert, Jr., Joseph, and Cherise. Albright died at his home in Florence, Alabama, on November 27, 2023, at the age of 87.
