= WVNA =

WVNA may refer to:

- WVNA (AM), a radio station (1590 AM) licensed to serve Tuscumbia, Alabama, United States
- WVNA-FM, a radio station (105.5 FM) licensed to serve Muscle Shoals, Alabama
