= Jeff Enfinger =

American politician

Member of the Alabama Senate from the 7th district
- In office November 4, 1998 – November 8, 2006
- Preceded by: Dewayne Freeman
- Succeeded by: Parker Griffith

Personal details
- Born: Jeffrey Wade Enfinger; July 27, 1951 (age 75) Huntsville, Alabama, U.S.
- Party: Democratic (2000–present); Republican (until 2000)
- Education: Vanderbilt University (BA)

Jeffrey Wade Enfinger (born July 27, 1951) is an American politician who served in the Alabama Senate. First elected as a Republican in 1998, he switched to the Democratic Party two years later. In 2003, he became the Senate's majority leader. After not seeking reelection in 2006, he ran for his old seat in 2010, losing to Paul Sanford.
