= Star 94 =

"Star 94" is the moniker of at least two radio stations in the U.S.:

- WSTR-FM 94.1 FM in Atlanta (Smyrna, Georgia)
- WMSR-FM 94.9 in Muscle Shoals (Florence, Alabama / Collinwood, Tennessee)

Both stations use the same name, but are not simulcast.
