= Givhan =

Givhan is a surname. Notable people with the surname include:

- Robin Givhan (born 1964), American fashion editor
- Sam Givhan (born 1967), American politician
- Walter C. Givhan (1902–1976), American politician
