= WMBZ =

WMBZ may refer to:

- WMBZ (FM), a radio station (92.5 FM) licensed to serve West Bend, Wisconsin, United States
- WBDL-LD, a low-power television station (channel 18, virtual 8) licensed to serve Elk Mound, Wisconsin, United States, which held the call sign WMBZ-LP from 2014 to 2015
- WWON-FM, a radio station (100.7 FM) licensed to serve Waynesboro, Tennessee, United States, which held the call sign WMBZ from 2009 to 2014
