= Laura Hall (politician) =

American politician (born 1943)

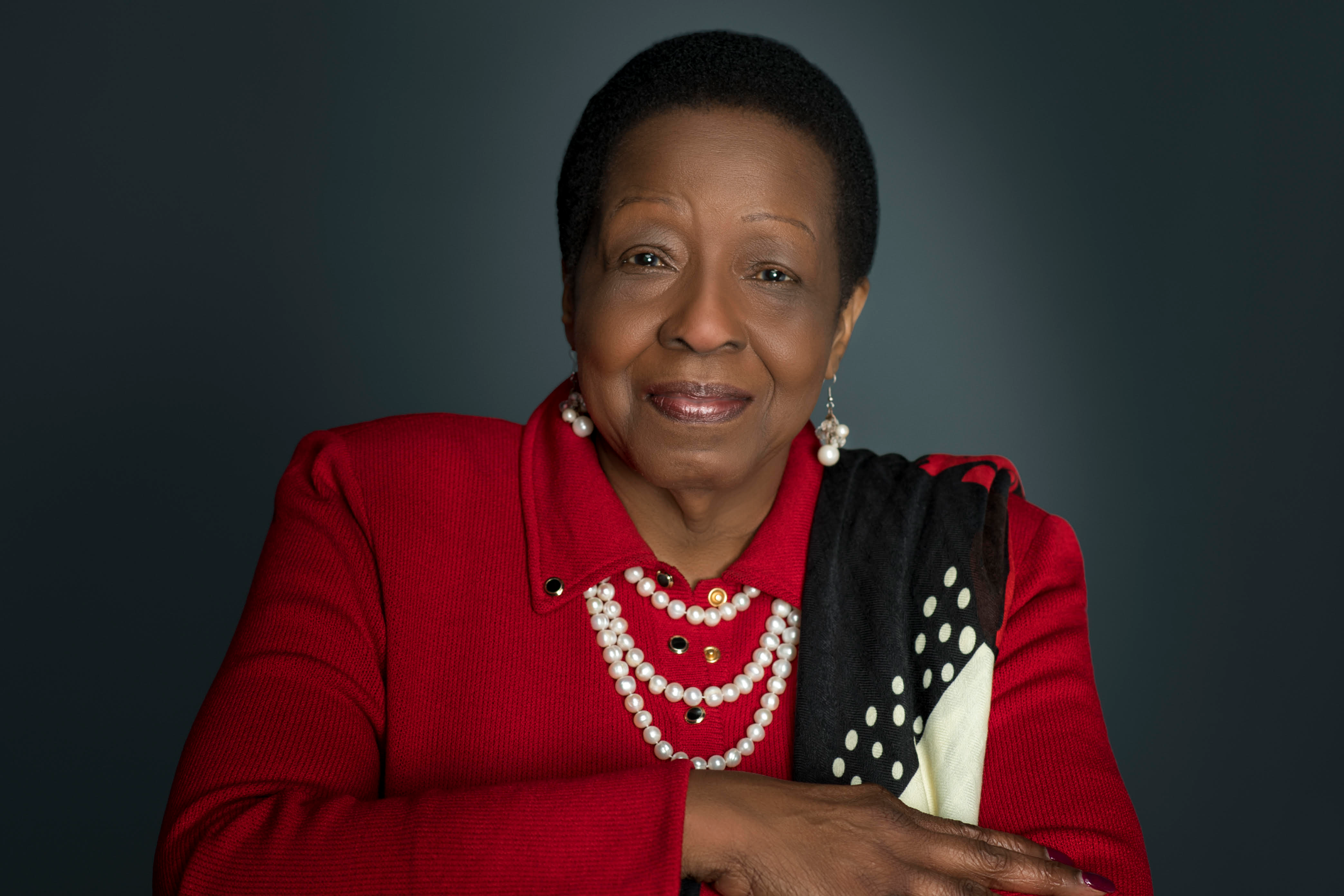

Member of the Alabama House of Representatives from the 19th district
- Incumbent
- Assumed office August 1993
- Preceded by: George W. Grayson

Personal details
- Born: January 25, 1943 (age 83) Sandy Springs, South Carolina
- Party: Democratic
- Education: Ohio State University; Alabama A&M University
- Occupation: Teacher

Laura Vandiver Hall (born January 25, 1943) is an American politician who currently serves in the Alabama House of Representatives representing House District 19 as a Democrat. Hall was first elected to the Alabama House of Representatives by special election in August 1993. She was re-elected in 1994 until now. She is a retired educator whose tenure in the education field extended for over forty years.

== Early life and education ==
Hall is a native of Pendleton, South Carolina. She received her elementary and secondary education in Pendleton Public Schools System. After graduating from Anderson County Training High School in 1960, she enrolled in Morris College in Sumter, South Carolina, and earned a Bachelor of Science degree in biology with chemistry as a minor. Further studies earned her a Master of Science degree in science education from Ohio State University and a K-12 administration certification from Alabama Agricultural and Mechanical University.

== Legislative career ==
Hall is the first African American woman elected to represent House District 19, capturing eighty-six (86) percent of the vote. Results from the 1994 election indicated that she captured 88% percent of the votes. During the 1998 election, she ran unopposed. She won the 2002 election and began serving a fifth term. Hall is the vice-chair of the Madison County Legislative Delegation and Ranking Minority Member of both the General Fund Finance and Appropriations and Internal Affairs committees.

Hall is Chair of the Alabama Women’s Tribute Statue Commission, created in 2019 to place statues of Rosa Parks and Helen Keller on the grounds of the Alabama State Capitol.

Her sponsored legislation includes:

- HB 427 which created a system of “Silver Alerts” for which all missing persons with dementia or Alzheimer's disease are eligible, regardless of age, as well as requiring law enforcement personnel to undergo specialized training regarding such cases.
- HB 474 which designated December 1 as Rosa Parks Day in honor of the “First Lady of Civil Rights.”
- HB 115 which created a policy by which newborns can be brought to hospitals within 72 hours of birth instead of being abandoned.

=== Committees ===
Her committee assignments have included:

- Judiciary
- Joint Interim on Medicaid
- Public Safety
- Welfare
- Health
- Industrial and Economic Development
- Joint Budget and Finance
- Government Finance and Appropriations
- Alabama Monument Protection

Hall serves as President of the National Black Caucus of State Legislators.

=== 2009 special election ===
Republican Paul Sanford defeated Hall in the special election to fill the District 7 State Senate Seat vacated earlier that year when the incumbent, Parker Griffith, was elected to the United States House of Representative representing Alabama's 5th Congressional District. Hall continued to represent District 19 after re-elections in 2010 and 2014.

=== 2018 general election ===
Hall defeated Samuel Greene in the Alabama House of Representatives District 19 Democratic primary election with 86.04% of the vote.

== Personal life ==
Hall was married to the late Dr. John W. Hall. She has two children and is Catholic.
