= WKGL =

WKGL may refer to:

- WKGL-FM, a radio station on FM 96.7 MHz serving the Rockford, Illinois area, USA
- WKGL, former callsign of WRRV, a modern rock radio station in Middletown, New York, USA
- WKGL, a radio station in Russellville, Alabama, USA, see WFBH-LP
