= Alabama's 7th Senate district =

Alabama's 7th State Senate district
Senator
Sam Givhan; R–Huntsville
- Demographics: 64.0% White; 25.5% Black; 4.8% Hispanic; 1.6% Asian
- Population (2022): 150,187

Alabama's 7th Senate district is one of 35 districts in the Alabama Senate. The district has been represented by Sam Givhan since 2018.

== Geography ==
Election	Map	Counties in District
2026; 2022		Portion of Madison
2018		Portion of Madison
2014		Portion of Madison
2010; 2006; 2002		Portion of Madison

== Election history ==
=== Elections in the 2020s ===
Alabama Senate election, 2022: Senate District 7
Party	Candidate	Votes	%	±%
Republican	Sam Givhan (Incumbent)	29,095	62.65	+7.43
Democratic	Korey Wilson	17,295	37.24	−7.48
Write-in		52	0.11	+0.05
Majority		11,800	25.41	+14.92
Turnout		46,442		
Republican hold				

=== Elections in the 2010s ===
Alabama Senate election, 2018: Senate District 7
Party	Candidate	Votes	%	±%
Republican	Sam Givhan	30,080	55.22	−9.55
Democratic	Deborah Barros	24,363	44.72	+9.59
Write-in		33	0.06	-0.04
Majority		5,717	10.49	−19.15
Turnout		54,476		
Republican hold				

Alabama Senate election, 2014: Senate District 7
Party	Candidate	Votes	%	±%
Republican	Paul Sanford (Incumbent)	22,873	64.77	+9.91
Democratic	Bryan Bennett	12,404	35.13	−9.95
Write-in		35	0.10	+0.04
Majority		10,469	29.64	
Turnout		35,312		
Republican hold				

Alabama Senate election, 2010: Senate District 7
Party	Candidate	Votes	%	±%
Republican	Paul Sanford (Incumbent)	25,333	54.86	−2.51
Democratic	Jeff Enfinger	20,819	45.08	+2.62
Write-in		28	0.06	-0.11
Majority		4,514	9.77	−5.14
Turnout		46,180		
Republican hold				

=== Elections in the 2000s ===
Alabama Senate District 7 special election - 9 June 2009
Party	Candidate	Votes	%	±%
Republican	Paul Sanford	11,994	57.37	+22.93
Democratic	Laura Hall	8,877	42.46	−22.97
Write-in		35	0.17	+0.04
Majority		3,117	14.91	−16.07
Turnout		20,906		
Republican gain from Democratic				

Alabama Senate election, 2006: Senate District 7
Party	Candidate	Votes	%	±%
Democratic	Parker Griffith	23,582	65.43	+1.28
Republican	Cheryl Baswell-Guthrie	12,414	34.44	+2.01
Write-in		48	0.13	-0.22
Majority		11,168	30.98	−0.74
Turnout		36,044		
Democratic hold				

Alabama Senate election, 2002: Senate District 7
Party	Candidate	Votes	%	±%
Democratic	Jeff Enfinger (Incumbent)	25,365	64.15	+14.93
Republican	Elbert Peters	12,823	32.43	−18.26
Libertarian	Gregory Bacon	1,266	3.20	+3.20
Write-in		139	0.35	+0.26
Majority		12,542	31.72	+30.25
Turnout		39,593		
Democratic gain from Republican				

=== Elections in the 1990s ===
Alabama Senate election, 1998: Senate District 7
Party	Candidate	Votes	%	±%
Republican	Jeff Enfinger (Incumbent)	18,419	50.69	+2.28
Democratic	Gloria Batts	17,884	49.22	−2.37
Write-in		33	0.09	+0.09
Majority		535	1.47	
Turnout		36,336		
Republican gain from Democratic				

Alabama Senate election, 1994: Senate District 7
Party	Candidate	Votes	%	±%
Democratic	Dewayne Freeman	18,354	51.59	−11.49
Republican	S. Tondera	17,220	48.41	+11.49
Majority		1,134	3.19	
Turnout		35,574		
Democratic hold				

Alabama Senate election, 1990: Senate District 7
Party	Candidate	Votes	%	±%
Democratic	Bill Smith (Incumbent)	21,219	63.08	+0.47
Republican	Elbert Peters	12,419	36.92	−0.47
Majority		8,800	26.16	+0.94
Turnout		33,638		
Democratic hold				

=== Elections in the 1980s ===
Alabama Senate election, 1986: Senate District 7
Party	Candidate	Votes	%	±%
Democratic	Bill Smith (Incumbent)	18,821	62.61	−37.39
Republican	Annie Wells	11,240	37.39	+37.39
Majority		7,581	25.22	−74.78
Turnout		30,061		
Democratic hold				

Alabama Senate special election, 1983: Senate District 7
Party	Candidate	Votes	%	±%
Democratic	Bill Smith (Incumbent)	9,800	100.00	
Majority		9,800	100.00	
Turnout		9,800		
Democratic hold				

Alabama Senate election, 1982: Senate District 7
Party	Candidate	Votes	%	±%
Democratic	Bill Smith (Incumbent)	18,686	100.00	
Majority		18,686	100.00	
Turnout		18,686		
Democratic hold				

== District officeholders ==
Senators take office at midnight on the day of their election.

- Sam Givhan (2018–present)
- Paul Sanford (2009–2018)
- Parker Griffith (2006–2009)
- Jeff Enfinger (1998–2006)
- Dewayne Freeman (1994–1998)
- Bill Smith (1978–1994)
- Bill G. King (1974–1978)
- Aubrey J. Carr (1966–1974)
- A. C. Shelton (1954–1966)
