= WLAY-FM =

- Littleville, Alabama; United States
- Broadcast area: Florence-Muscle Shoals Metropolitan Area
- Frequency: 100.1 MHz
- Branding: WLAY FM 100.1

Programming
- Format: Classic country

Ownership
- Owner: Mike Self and Parker Griffith; (Singing River Media Group, LLC)
- Sister stations: WLAY, WMSR-FM, WMXV, WVNA, WVNA-FM

History
- First air date: 1986 (as WZMX at 97.7)
- Former call signs: WZMX (1986–1990); WSHK (1990–1998); WKGL (1998–2003); WMXV (2003–2006); WJOR-FM (2006–2006)
- Former frequencies: 97.7 MHz (1986–2003); 103.5 MHz (2003–2016)

Technical information
- Licensing authority: FCC
- Facility ID: 14928
- Class: A
- ERP: 2,900 watts
- HAAT: 114 meters
- Transmitter coordinates: 34°40′27″N 87°42′48″W

Links
- Public license information: Public file; LMS
- Webcast: Listen Live
- Website: wlayfm.com

WLAY-FM (100.1 MHz, "Shoals Country") is a radio station licensed to serve Littleville, Alabama, United States. The station is owned by Mike Self and Parker Griffith, through licensee Singing River Media Group, LLC

WLAY-FM broadcasts a classic country format to the greater Florence/Muscle Shoals, Alabama, area. Programming includes the syndicated Rick and Bubba Show in the morning, mid-days with Kelli Karlson, afternoons with Kevin Whorton and nights with Whitney Allen. The current Program and Music Director for the radio station is Brian Rickman.

== History ==
The Federal Communications Commission issued the original construction permit for a new FM station in Russellville, Alabama, to broadcast with 3,000 watts of effective radiated power at 97.7 MHz on March 10, 1986. The new station was assigned the call letters WZMX by the FCC on June 6, 1986. In June 1986, Rambo Broadcasting reached an agreement to assign the permit for this station to Mountain Top Broadcasting, Inc. The deal was approved by the FCC on August 25, 1986, and the transaction was consummated on September 22, 1986. WZMX received its license to cover from the FCC on November 4, 1987.

In April 1990, David E. Morrow agreed to transfer control of this station's licensee to James Michael Self. The deal was approved by the FCC on June 25, 1990, and the transaction was consummated on the same day. The station's callsign was changed to WSHK on July 13, 1990.

In November 1997, D. Mitchell Self Broadcasting, Inc., reached an agreement to sell this station to US South Broadcasting Company, Inc. The deal was approved by the FCC on January 15, 1998, and the transaction was consummated on February 20, 1998. The new owners had the FCC change the call letters to WKGL on July 27, 1998.

In November 1998, US South Broadcasting Company, Inc., reached an agreement to sell this station to Cumulus Broadcasting through their Cumulus Licensing Corp. subsidiary. The three-station deal was publicly valued at $6.3 million. The deal was approved by the FCC on December 31, 1998, and the transaction was consummated on March 1, 1999.

In August 2000, Cumulus Broadcasting's subsidiary Cumulus Licensing Corp. reached an agreement to sell this station and four others in the area to Clear Channel Communications through their Clear Channel Broadcasting Licenses, Inc., subsidiary. This deal was part of a larger exchange of 45 Cumulus-owned stations for 4 Clear Channel-owned stations and an unspecified amount of cash for a total deal value of $52 million. The deal was approved by the FCC on December 19, 2000, and the transaction was consummated on January 18, 2001.

WMXV "V103.5" logo

On April 21, 2003, the station's call letters were changed to WMXV and the station adopted a "V103.5" branding. In October 2004, Clear Channel Broadcasting Licenses, Inc., reached an agreement to sell this station to URBan Radio Broadcasting subsidiary Urban Radio Licenses, Inc. The deal was approved by the FCC on December 21, 2004, and the transaction was consummated on May 13, 2005.

While the sale was pending, Clear Channel applied to the FCC to change WMVX's community of license from Russellville to Littleville, Alabama, and the broadcast frequency from 97.7 MHz to 103.5 MHz. (This was part of a multi-station frequency swap by Clear Channel that saw the 97.7 MHz frequency reassigned to WKXM-FM in Winfield, Alabama.) The application proposed a technical change only as no move of the transmitter site was requested or required. The station was granted a construction permit on January 19, 2005. The station received its license to cover this change on January 25, 2007.

URBan Radio Broadcasting had the FCC change the station's call letters to WJOR-FM on March 3, 2006, before having the FCC change it again one week later on March 10, 2006, to the current WLAY-FM.

WLAY-FM moved its broadcast frequency again effective August 29, 2016, from 103.5 MHz to 100.1 MHz.

Effective April 1, 2019, URBan Radio sold WLAY-FM and five sister stations to Singing River Media Group, LLC for $1.275 million.
