= Dewayne Freeman =

American politician

President pro tempore of the Alabama Senate
- In office February 6, 1997 – November 4, 1998
- Preceded by: Michael Figures
- Succeeded by: Lowell Barron

Member of the Alabama Senate from the 7th district
- In office November 9, 1994 – November 4, 1998
- Preceded by: Bill Smith
- Succeeded by: Jeff Enfinger

Member of the Alabama House of Representatives
- In office November 5, 1986 – November 9, 1994
- Preceded by: Bob Albright
- Succeeded by: Randy Hinshaw
- Constituency: 21st district
- In office November 3, 1982 – November 9, 1983
- Preceded by: Richard Gregg
- Succeeded by: George Grayson
- Constituency: 19th district

Personal details
- Born: Charles Dewayne Freeman; September 1, 1955 (age 70) Henagar, Alabama, U.S.
- Party: Democratic
- Spouse: Cheryl Perdue (m. 1994; div. 2001)

Charles Dewayne Freeman (born September 1, 1955) is an American politician. Rising to president pro tempore of the Alabama Senate, he ran for Lieutenant Governor of Alabama in 1998 but lost fellow senator Steve Windom. He was appointed by Don Siegelman as Director of the Alabama Department of Economic and Community Affairs, but resigned in 2000 after being arrested for domestic violence.

Alabama House of Representatives
Preceded by Richard Gregg	Member of the Alabama House of Representatives from the 19th district 1982–1983	Succeeded by George Grayson
Preceded by Bob Albright	Member of the Alabama House of Representatives from the 21st district 1986–1994	Succeeded by Randy Hinshaw
Alabama Senate
Preceded by Bill Smith	Member of the Alabama Senate from the 7th district 1994–1998	Succeeded by Jeff Enfinger
Preceded by Michael Figures	President pro tempore of the Alabama Senate; 1997–1998	Succeeded by Lowell Barron
Party political offices
Preceded by Don Siegelman	Democratic nominee for Lieutenant Governor of Alabama; 1998	Succeeded by Lucy Baxley
