= WMSR-FM =

Coordinates: 35.030°N 87.785°W

- Collinwood, Tennessee; United States
- Broadcast area: Florence-Muscle Shoals Metropolitan Area
- Frequency: 94.9 MHz
- Branding: 94.9 The Bull

Programming
- Format: Country
- Affiliations: Premiere Networks

Ownership
- Owner: Mike Self and Parker Griffith; (Singing River Media Group, LLC)
- Sister stations: WLAY, WLAY-FM, WMXV, WVNA, WVNA-FM

History
- First air date: 1991
- Former call signs: WTNR-FM (July 25, 1990-May 9, 1994); WFRQ (May 9, 1994-September 8, 1998)
- Call sign meaning: W Muscle Shoals Radio or M uscle Shoals StaR

Technical information
- Licensing authority: FCC
- Facility ID: 50128
- Class: C3
- ERP: 7,100 watts
- HAAT: 181 meters (594 ft)

Links
- Public license information: Public file; LMS
- Webcast: Listen Live
- Website: thebull949.com

WMSR-FM (94.9 MHz) is a radio station licensed to Collinwood, Tennessee. It is part of the Florence/Muscle Shoals, Alabama, radio market and is owned by Mike Self and Parker Griffith through licensee Singing River Media Group, LLC.

== History ==
WMSR-FM began as country WTNR-FM, simulcasting WTNR from Waynesboro, Tennessee. WTNR-FM changed callsigns to WFRQ on May 7, 1994. It changed callsigns again on September 8, 1998, taking the current WMSR-FM. As of August 30, 2013, the station flipped from contemporary hit radio (CHR) to adult album alternative (AAA), keeping the "Star" name.

Most of the airstaff remained following the format adjustments. The station retained the popular Kidd Kraddick in the Morning Program.

On November 2, 2015, WMSR rebranded as "94.9 The X".

In late March 2018, WMSR-FM changed their format from adult album alternative to urban contemporary, branded as "Power 94.9".

On April 26, 2019, WMSR-FM changed their format from urban contemporary to country, branded as "94.9 The Bull".
