= WFBH-LP =

Radio station in Hamilton, Alabama (2002–2018)

- Hamilton, Alabama; United States
- Frequency: 96.7 MHz

Programming
- Format: Defunct, was Christian
- Affiliations: Moody Broadcasting Network

Ownership
- Owner: First Baptist Church Hamilton

History
- First air date: December 10, 2002
- Last air date: December 31, 2018
- Call sign meaning: First Baptist Hamilton

Technical information
- Licensing authority: FCC
- Facility ID: 133868
- Class: L1
- ERP: 100 watts
- HAAT: 9 meters (30 feet)

Links
- Public license information: LMS

WFBH-LP (96.7 FM) was a radio station licensed to serve Hamilton, Alabama. The station was owned by First Baptist Church Hamilton. It aired a Christian radio format. While largely locally originated, a portion of the station's programming was derived from the Moody Broadcasting Network.

== History ==
This station was granted its original construction permit by the Federal Communications Commission (FCC) on November 18, 2001. The new station was assigned the WFBH-LP call letters by the FCC on December 3, 2002. WFBH-LP began regular broadcast operations on December 10, 2002, and received its license to cover on April 10, 2003.

First Baptist Church Hamilton, Alabama

Originally licensed to broadcast at 103.5 MHz, the station petitioned the FCC in August 2005 to change frequencies as its signal suffered interference from WKGL in Russellville, Alabama, and WMXV in Littleville, Alabama. The FCC authorized the change in October 2005 and WFBH-LP began broadcasting at 96.7 MHz in July 2006.

The station ceased broadcasting on December 31, 2018, having sent a letter to the FCC on December 28, 2018, requesting cancellation of the station's license. In the letter, they noted that, in a business meeting, the church "voted unanimously to shut down the radio station" and stated: "We will no longer be broadcasting through this station. Beginning January 1, 2019, all equipment will be disconnected and powered off." The FCC cancelled the station's license on February 7, 2019.
