= WLAY (AM) =

- Muscle Shoals, Alabama; United States
- Broadcast area: Florence-Muscle Shoals Metropolitan Area
- Frequency: 1450 kHz
- Branding: WLAY 104.7 Classics

Programming
- Format: Silent (was Oldies)

Ownership
- Owner: Mike Self and Parker Griffith; (Singing River Media Group, LLC)
- Sister stations: WLAY-FM, WVNA (AM), WVNA-FM, WMXV, WMSR-FM

History
- First air date: 1933 (as WNRA)
- Former call signs: WNRA (1933–1935); WMSD (1935–1942)

Technical information
- Licensing authority: FCC
- Facility ID: 60611
- Class: C
- Power: 1,000 watts
- Transmitter coordinates: 34°45′23″N 87°41′08″W
- Translator: 104.7 W284DS (Florence)

Links
- Public license information: Public file; LMS
- Webcast: Listen Live

WLAY (1450 kHz) is an AM radio station serving the Florence/Muscle Shoals, Alabama, market. It is also heard on a translator at 104.7 on the FM band; it is licensed to the city of Muscle Shoals, Alabama. WLAY is owned by Mike Self and Parker Griffith, through licensee Singing River Media Group, LLC.

WLAY (AM) is one of the oldest broadcast radio stations in Alabama and the Southern United States.

WLAY (AM) ceased transmitting in December 2014.

== History ==
The station signed on in 1933 as WNRA, and has since secured its place in American music history thanks to its contribution to what is now commonly referred to as "The Muscle Shoals Sound". Originating its broadcast as a "variety format", WLAY was significant in its early years as a rare frequency that would broadcast both Southern Gospel and Country music and "race music" or music by African American artists. In the American Deep South, this was certainly unique. A number of bluegrass and delta blues musicians made regular live appearances on the radio station including Bill Monroe, Earl Scruggs, Sonny Boy Williamson and Son House.

=== Cultural influence ===
In the 1950s, the station balanced both country music and Rock and Roll music on its playlist. Sam Phillips, future founder of Sun Records, worked as a disc jockey at the radio station in his formative years and frequently cited the station's "open playlist" as the inspiration for what would become Sun Records in Memphis, Tennessee, blending both country and blues music to form Rock and Roll.

In the early 1960s, Muscle Shoals began to develop as a popular music capital in the United States and WLAY played an important role in this growth. Following the success of local resident Arthur Alexander (and his hit single "You Better Move On"; later covered by the Rolling Stones), the area quickly saw the rise of numerous recording studios. With this, WLAY became a meeting place for numerous Muscle Shoals musicians and songwriters as they would frequent the studios with new recordings. Percy Sledge's "When A Man Loves A Woman" was recorded at Norala Sound Studio by WLAY disc jockey Quin Ivy, co-producer Marlin Greene , and WLAY Chief Engineer Paul Kelley. Kelley built Norala with equipment borrowed from WLAY's studios.

With the establishment of Rick Hall's FAME Studios, WLAY would often play recordings as they were completed at the legendary studio. The WLAY audience would frequently choose the "single" by artists such as Aretha Franklin, Wilson Pickett, Clarence Carter, and several others to be shipped nationwide after having heard the entire, completed session on the air.

=== Ownership changes ===
Former logo

The station's independent owners sold the station and it has changed hands many times since. Following the development of WLAY-FM, the AM frequency altered its format a number of times. It has been a Sports station and Oldies station in addition to a Country formatted station. When the frequency was purchased by URBan Radio Broadcasting, the format was changed to reflect the station's history. It now plays only local music recorded or written in Muscle Shoals.

=== Memorials ===
The 1960s’ Altec mixer from WLAY's production room is now permanently housed in the Alabama Music Hall of Fame. The radio station is also regarded as a Historic Landmark by the Alabama Historical Society. In 2007, 2010 and 2012 WLAY was nominated for Radio Station of the Year by the Alabama Broadcasters Association.

== FM translator ==
It was announced in October 2007, that the station had received permission from the Federal Communications Commission to re-broadcast its programming on the FM band at 92.3. The rebroadcast began on October 31, 2007. This move significantly increased the radio station's reach in the market.

The station celebrated the 92.3 FM launch with a two-day marathon, broadcasting live from two of the city’s most celebrated recording studios. FAME Studios, where recordings by Aretha Franklin, Wilson Pickett, the Allman Brothers Band, Little Richard, Jerry Lee Lewis, Solomon Burke, George Jones and Otis Redding have been recorded, played host to 92.3 FM on day one of the launch. Muscle Shoals Sound Studios, who had recorded with artists including Bob Dylan, Rod Stewart, Bob Seger, Paul Simon, The Staple Singers, Cher, Boz Scaggs, Cat Stevens, Lynyrd Skynyrd, Willie Nelson, The Rolling Stones, Joe Cocker and Traffic, was the site of the second day’s broadcast.

During the launch, 92.3 FM played host to a virtual who's who of Muscle Shoals music luminaries. Rare on-air interviews were conducted with FAME Studios owner Rick Hall and Muscle Shoals Rhythm Section members (and former owners of Muscle Shoals Sound Studios) David Hood and Jimmy Johnson. Additionally, the station spent hours sharing stories with famed area songwriters Donnie Fritts ("Breakfast in Bed", "We Had It All"), Earl "Peanut" Montgomery ("We Must Have Been Out Of Our Minds", "What’s Your Mama’s Name, Child?"), Mark Narmore ("What I Love About Sunday"), Gary Baker ("I Swear") as well as legendary session players and contemporary Muscle Shoals-based artists including John Paul White, Jason Isbell, The Drive-By Truckers, Sons of Roswell, Dillon Hodges, Byron Green, Heartland, and The Shoals.

After the addition of the FM translator, WLAY dropped its call letters and began referring to itself as "1450 and 92.3 The Sound" (in reference to the "Muscle Shoals Sound"). The station still identifies itself as "WLAY" in its Legal ID at the top of the hour. Further, The Sound began playing an increased amount of new local music in addition to the "classic" Muscle Shoals titles it had become known for. This made the station one of the few commercial radio stations in the United States playing unsigned, local artists in regular "current" rotation.

In late June 2010 WLAY and Shoals-area WVNA lost the lease on their combined transmitter site. The stations were off the air while the owners searched for a new site. The station was reported back on around June 24, 2011 with very low power. The AM was operating from the STL (studio to transmitter link tower) at the studios under a special temporary authority.

In 2012, Urban Radio did not file a license renewal application for the 92.3 translator or another translator located at 101.1 FM in Florence. The licenses expired in April 2012 and were deleted from the FCC database one year later. (FCC Records)

Following the expiration of W222AV 92.3 FM's license, an application for a new Class D FM station at 92.3 FM was filed, resulting in a construction permit being awarded in February 2014. This station signed on the air as WSHF 92.3 FM in June 2015, continuing the Muscle Shoals Music and Oldies format. Following a frequency change to 94.5 FM in 2019, the station reclaimed the WNRA call letters in July 2022, bringing the history of the station full circle. (Taken from Alabama Broadcast Media Page)

On December 7, 2015 Kevin Wagner-led URBan Radio filed a pleading with the FCC to keep the license for WLAY and WVNA active, claiming to have found a buyer for both stations, which was granted on December 15. The stations collectively will have been off for exactly a year on the 16th, which normally means they are automatically deleted by the FCC. As part of the request, URBan wants to return WLAY to the air with 60 watts from a longwire installed behind the URBan Radio studios on Main Street in Tuscumbia. That authorization came on by the 16th with country music and Shoals Country liners, although it is not a direct simulcast. The STA was granted and they kept stringing along on STAs into 2017, when they finally filed an application to permanently move the station's transmitter site to the WVNA-FM tower off New Cut Road, south of Tuscumbia. (Taken from Alabama Broadcast Media Page)

A construction permit for this change and a power decrease to 930 watts was granted on April 18, 2017.

Effective April 1, 2019, URBan Radio sold WLAY and five sister stations to Singing River Media Group, LLC for $1.275 million. The group is owned by Mike Self, and Parker Griffith, a one-term U.S. Representative and candidate for Alabama Governor in 2014. (FCC Ownership Reports)
