= Paint Rock, Alabama =

- Town
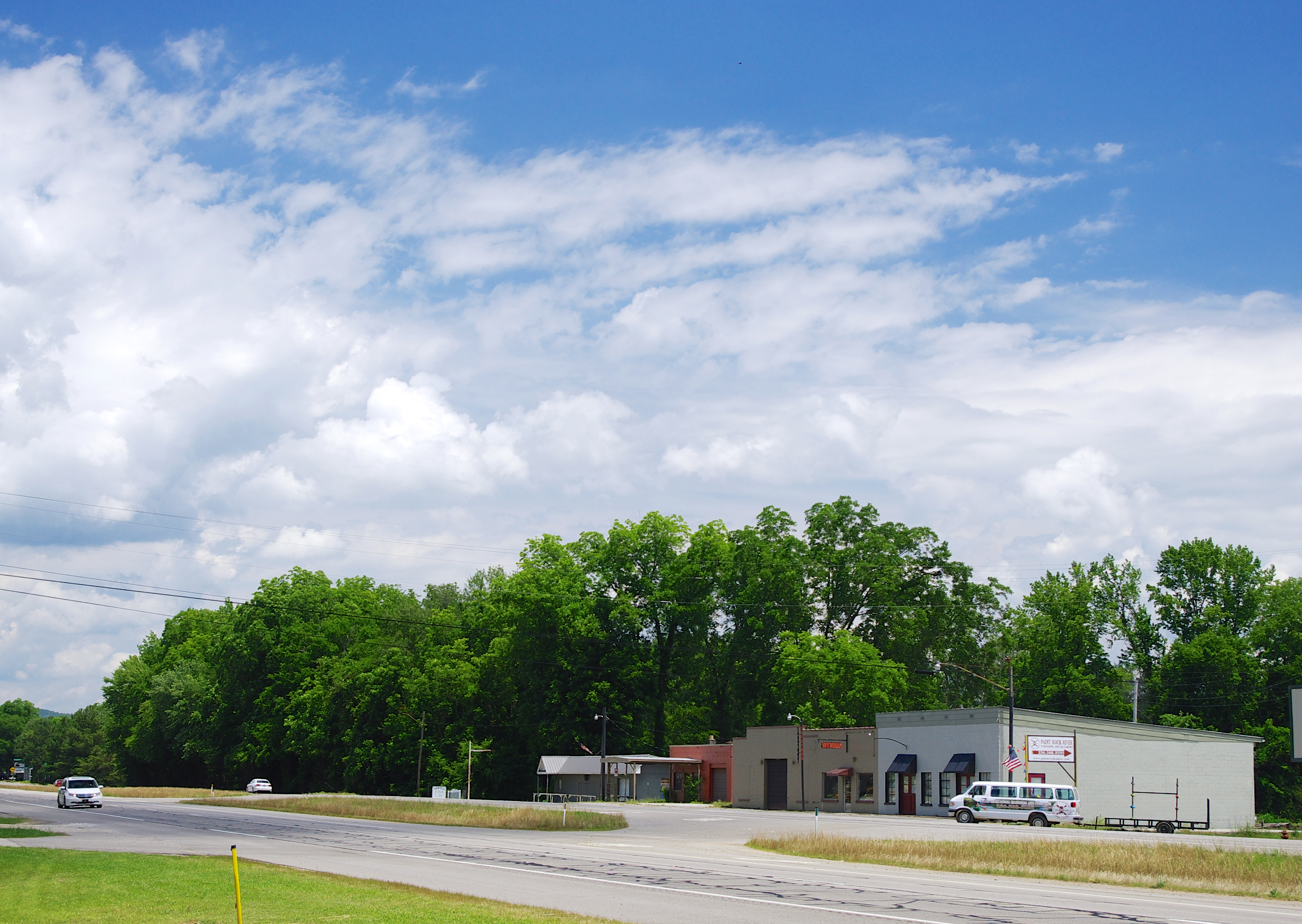
- Businesses along US-72 in Paint Rock

- Location of Paint Rock in Jackson County, Alabama.
- Coordinates: 34°39′37″N 86°19′41″W
- Country: United States
- State: Alabama
- County: Jackson

Area
  - Total: 0.44 sq mi (1.15 km^{2})
  - Land: 0.43 sq mi (1.12 km^{2})
  - Water: 0.0077 sq mi (0.02 km^{2})
- Elevation: 610 ft (186 m)

Population (2020)
  - Total: 182
  - Density: 419.9/sq mi (162.12/km^{2})
- Time zone: UTC-6 (Central (CST))
  - Summer (DST): UTC-5 (CDT)
- ZIP code: 35764
- Area code: 256
- FIPS code: 01-57696
- GNIS feature ID: 0154485

Paint Rock is a town in Jackson County, Alabama, United States, along the Paint Rock River, and is included in the Huntsville-Decatur Combined Statistical Area. It was incorporated in July 1894.

As of the 2020 census, Paint Rock had a population of 182. Out of 13 incorporated communities in Jackson County, it is the least populated. Its peak population was in 1910 when it had 534 people and was the 4th largest town in the county.

Paint Rock is the location where the Scottsboro Boys were arrested.

== History ==
Paint Rock was settled in the 1820s, and was initially known as "Camden." A post office was established in 1836, and a railroad depot was constructed in 1856. The name was changed from Camden to "Paint Rock" in 1876.

Ray Albright (1934-2017), Tennessee state legislator and businessman, was born in Paint Rock.

== Geography ==
Paint Rock is located at 34°39′37″N 86°19′41″W (34.660172, -86.328018). The town is situated along the Paint Rock River in a relatively narrow valley between Keel Mountain to the west and the Cumberland Plateau to the east. Gurley lies to the northwest, Woodville lies to the southeast, and Owens Cross Roads lies across Keel Mountain to the southwest. The Fern Cave National Wildlife Refuge is located along the base of the Cumberland Plateau just east of Paint Rock. U.S. Route 72 passes through Paint Rock, connecting the town with Scottsboro to the east and Huntsville to the west.

According to the U.S. Census Bureau, the town has a total area of 0.4 square miles (1.0 km^{2}), all land.

== Demographics ==
Historical population
Census	Pop.	Note	%±
1880	41		—
1900	394		—
1910	534		35.5%
1920	332		−37.8%
1930	320		−3.6%
1940	282		−11.9%
1950	276		−2.1%
1960	264		−4.3%
1970	226		−14.4%
1980	221		−2.2%
1990	214		−3.2%
2000	185		−13.6%
2010	210		13.5%
2020	182		−13.3%
U.S. Decennial Census; 2013 Estimate

As of the census of 2000, there were 185 people, 81 households, and 57 families residing in the town. The population density was 415.9 inhabitants per square mile (160.6/km^{2}). There were 94 housing units at an average density of 211.3 per square mile (81.6/km^{2}). The racial makeup of the town was 96.76% White, 0.54% Native American, and 2.70% from two or more races.

There were 81 households, out of which 27.2% had children under the age of 18 living with them, 54.3% were married couples living together, 11.1% had a female householder with no husband present, and 29.6% were non-families. 29.6% of all households were made up of individuals, and 13.6% had someone living alone who was 65 years of age or older. The average household size was 2.28 and the average family size was 2.77.

In the town, the population was spread out, with 18.4% under the age of 18, 14.1% from 18 to 24, 24.9% from 25 to 44, 24.9% from 45 to 64, and 17.8% who were 65 years of age or older. The median age was 38 years. For every 100 females, there were 92.7 males. For every 100 females age 18 and over, there were 98.7 males.

The median income for a household in the town was $35,521, and the median income for a family was $36,875. Males had a median income of $28,750 versus $16,719 for females. The per capita income for the town was $15,551. About 8.3% of families and 10.8% of the population were below the poverty line, including none of those under the age of eighteen or sixty-five or over.
