= WMXV =

Coordinates: 34.930°N 87.529°W

- Saint Joseph, Tennessee; United States
- Broadcast area: Florence-Muscle Shoals Metropolitan Area
- Frequency: 101.5 MHz
- Branding: My 101.5

Programming
- Format: Hot adult contemporary
- Subchannels: HD2: Silent; HD3: Urban contemporary; HD4: Silent

Ownership
- Owner: Mike Self and Parker Griffith; (Singing River Media Group, LLC)
- Sister stations: WLAY (AM), WLAY-FM, WMSR-FM, WVNA (AM), WVNA-FM

History
- First air date: 1991; 35 years ago
- Former call signs: WJOR-FM (1991–2006)

Technical information
- Licensing authority: FCC
- Facility ID: 6709
- Class: A
- ERP: 2,850 watts
- HAAT: 147.6 meters (484 ft)
- Translator: HD3: 105.1 W286DV (Florence)

Links
- Public license information: Public file; LMS
- Webcast: Listen Live; Listen Live (HD3)
- Website: my1015.com the1051fm.com (HD3)

WMXV (101.5 FM, "My 101.5") is a hot adult contemporary radio station licensed to Saint Joseph, Tennessee. WMXV broadcasts as part of the Florence-Muscle Shoals Metropolitan Area, Arbitron radio market.

Personalities on the station include D.L. Hughley and Keith Sweat.

On April 12, 2019, WMXV changed formats from urban adult contemporary to hot adult contemporary, branded as "My 101.5".
