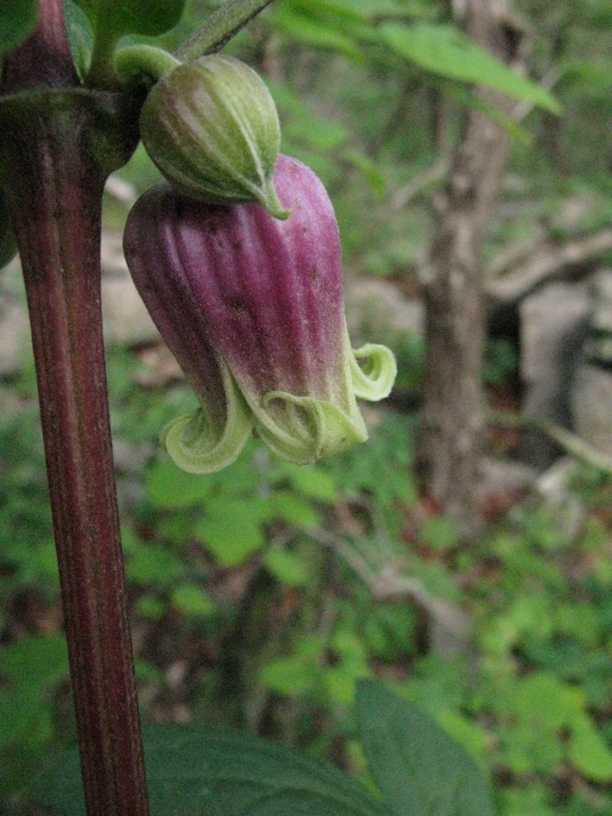

Conservation status
- Imperiled (NatureServe)

- Endangered (ESA)

Scientific classification
- Kingdom: Plantae
- Clade: Tracheophytes
- Clade: Angiosperms
- Clade: Eudicots
- Order: Ranunculales
- Family: Ranunculaceae
- Genus: Clematis
- Species: C. morefieldii

Binomial name
- Clematis morefieldii Kral

Synonyms
- Coriflora morefieldii (Kral) W.A. Weber

= Clematis morefieldii =

Species of flowering plant in the buttercup family

Clematis morefieldii is a rare species of flowering plant in the buttercup family known by the common names Morefield's leather flower and Huntsville vasevine.

It is endemic to northern Alabama and southern Tennessee, where it is known from about 22 populations currently, most of which are small. Many of the populations are threatened, and some have been recently extirpated. It is a federally listed endangered species, listed in 1992.

== Distribution and habitat ==
This species of Clematis was discovered in 1982, in a vacant lot on Round Top Mountain in Madison County, Alabama, by 21-year-old botany student James Morefield. It was described as a new species in 1987 and named for him. The plant was believed to be an Alabama endemic when it was given endangered status in 1992. Collections were later made in adjacent southern Tennessee.

It grows in wooded habitat dominated by smoketree (Cotinus obovatus), often near streams or seeps. It is a climbing plant which attaches to shrubs and rocks for support. The limestone substrate is very rocky with large boulders.

== Description ==
Clematis morefieldii produces woolly-haired vine runners up to 5 metres (16 ft) long. The leaves are compound, each made up of several leaflets and one or more tendrils for grabbing objects around the plant. The leaflets have velvety undersides.

The inflorescences occur in the axils of the leaves. Each has up to five flowers which have green-tinged pink sepals with curling tips arranged in an urn shape. The flower is thick and hairy in texture. There are no petals. The flower is up to 2.5 centimeters in length.

The plant yields fruits which may reach 3.5 centimeters long including their plume-like tips.

== Conservation ==
In 1991 when the plant was nominated for endangered species status it was only known from five populations/sites, each less than 1 acre (0.40 ha) wide, and one had with only a single plant. About 55% of the total population was located on land scheduled for construction. This area, on the outskirts of Huntsville, was experiencing significant real estate development expansion. Three other sites were believed to have been destroyed recently. Threats listed at the time included construction and maintenance of roads, residential development, herbicides, and potentially the collection of specimens by wildflower enthusiasts and horticulturalists.

By 2010 there were over 20 populations known but the plant was determined to still warrant endangered status. Several populations are in protected areas such as the Land Trust of North Alabama's Nature Preserves or the Keel Mountain Preserve, but some are clinging to fragments of habitat with development growing around them. Most of the same threats remain, with the additional threats of quarrying activity for one Tennessee population and logging and non-native plant species such as exotic honeysuckle vines (Lonicera spp.) in Alabama. Wildflower collecting is not believed to be a problem today. The small sizes of the individual populations make their extirpation more likely.

More research is being done regarding the life history of this plant and its ecology, including potentially damaging insects that may attack it. The last U.S. Fish and Wildlife Service 5 year review of the Recovery Plan was issued in 2010.
