= Ray Albright =

American businessman and politician (1934–2017)

Member of the Tennessee Senate
- In office 1971–1995

Member of the Tennessee House of Representatives from the 5th district
- In office 1969–1971

Personal details
- Born: February 28, 1934 Paint Rock, Alabama, U.S.
- Died: July 31, 2017 (aged 83) Florence, Alabama, U.S.
- Party: Republican
- Education: Vanderbilt School of Banking

Raymond C. "Ray" Albright (February 28, 1934 – July 31, 2017) was an American businessman and politician.

Albright was born in Paint Rock, Alabama. He graduated from Central High School and the Vanderbilt School of Banking. In 1953 he started working at Combustion Engineering where he worked for 19 years making covers for boilers. During this time, he was believed to have been exposed to asbestos. He was diagnosed forty years later with mesothelioma. Albright's brother, Bob Albright, served in the Alabama House of Representatives.

Albright was involved in the banking business in Chattanooga, Tennessee, joining the United Bank in 1970 and then as a senior vice president of Union Planters National Bank.

Albright served in the Tennessee House of Representatives from 1969 to 1971 and was a Republican. He then served in the Tennessee Senate from 1971 to 1995.
