= Fern Cave National Wildlife Refuge =

National Wildlife Refuge in northeastern Alabama

- IUCN category IV (habitat/species management area)
- Location within the United States
- Location: Jackson County, Alabama, United States
- Nearest city: Paint Rock, Alabama
- Coordinates: 34.675366°N 86.315972°W
- Area: 199.23 acres (0.8 km^{2})
- Established: 1981
- Governing body: U.S. Fish and Wildlife Service
- Website: Fern Cave NWR

Fern Cave National Wildlife Refuge is a 199-acre (0.8 km^{2}) National Wildlife Refuge located in northeastern Alabama, near Paint Rock, Alabama in Jackson County.

The refuge is undeveloped and not intended for recreational visitation. Access into the cave is not permitted due to the endangered species of bats present. The site is administered by the Wheeler National Wildlife Refuge in nearby Decatur, Alabama.

== Topography ==
Most of the Fern Cave NWR is on the western side of Nat Mountain between Scottsboro and Huntsville, Alabama. The Paint Rock River, a tributary of the Tennessee River borders the northwestern side of the refuge. Elevation ranges from the relative flat area around the Paint Rock River valley to a 1,500+ foot elevation at the top of the mountain.

== Fern Cave ==
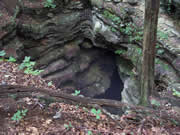
Entrance to Fern Cave

Fern Cave NWR is named after the eponymous cave located in the refuge; in the entrance sinkhole, early cave explorers found an abundance of American hart's-tongue ferns (Asplenium scolopendrium var. americanum); in the modern day, the variation/subspecies is considered federally endangered. The hart's tongue fern population at the cave has been drastically reduced since 1985 due to the actions of illegal plant collectors. The fern also grows in a small pit in Morgan County, but it is closed off for similar reasons.

Fern Cave itself is described as a "vertical and horizontal maze". There are over a dozen different vertical levels of intertwined canyons that are connected by vertical pits and domes. The cave has over 15 miles (24 km) of known passage and a total vertical extent of 450 feet (140 m) deep.

There are five entrances to the cave, four of which are located on the Fern Cave NWR land. All of the cave entrances on NWR land are closed to visitation and violation can result in Federal trespassing charges. The fifth entrance is owned by the Southeastern Cave Conservancy. Currently, the cave is closed to the public to protect the endangered Indiana grey bats which use the cave as a maternity roost and hibernaculum.

== Wildlife ==
Fern Cave serves as a home to the largest colony of federally endangered gray bats in the United States. NWR officials estimate that over 1.5 million gray bats use the cave annually. Biologists with the US Fish and Wildlife Service have confirmed the presence within the cave of the fungus that causes white nose syndrome.

Approximately 200 species of animals use the refuge. Other than the endangered bats, the cave contains southern cavefish (Typhlichthys subterraneus), blackbarred crayfish (Cambarus unestami), Spotted-tail salamanders (Eurycea lucifuga), and northern slimy salamanders (Plethodon glutinosus). Other fish species in the refuge include banded sculpin (Cottus carolinae), bluegill (Lepomis macrochirus) and yellow bullhead catfish (Ictalurus natalis). Outside of the cave, mammals include white-tailed deer (Odocoileus virginianus), wild turkeys (Meleagris gallopavo), squirrels (Sciurinae sp.), opossums (Didelphis virginiana), and raccoons (Procyon lotor).

== Facilities ==
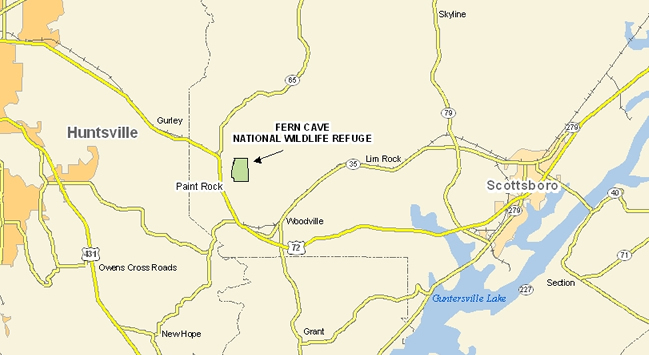
Map of Fern Cave NWR

Fern Cave itself is not open to the public in order to protect the endangered bats and ferns that live in and around the cave. There are no developed facilities, roads, or hiking trails on the refuge and it is not publicly accessible as there is no public easement to the property. Entering the refuge requires special permits as well as permission from multiple private landowners to cross their properties.

== Images ==
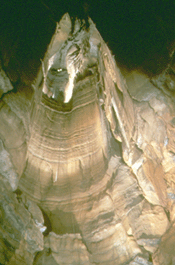
Inside Fern Cave

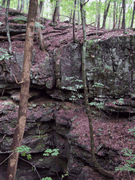
Fern Cave NWR

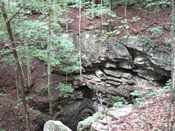
Fern Cave NWR

== See also ==
- List of National Wildlife Refuges
