= WVNA-FM =

- Muscle Shoals, Alabama; United States
- Broadcast area: Florence-Muscle Shoals Metropolitan Area
- Frequency: 105.5 MHz
- Branding: Rock 105.5, The Big Dog

Programming
- Format: Mainstream rock
- Affiliations: Westwood One

Ownership
- Owner: Mike Self and Parker Griffith; (Singing River Media Group, LLC)
- Sister stations: WLAY, WLAY-FM, WMSR-FM, WMXV, WVNA

History
- First air date: October 28, 1964
- Former call signs: WLAY-FM (1964–2000)
- Call sign meaning: Voice of North Alabama

Technical information
- Licensing authority: FCC
- Facility ID: 60610
- Class: A
- ERP: 4,400 watts
- HAAT: 118 meters (387 ft)
- Transmitter coordinates: 34°40′27″N 87°42′48″W

Links
- Public license information: Public file; LMS
- Webcast: Listen live
- Website: bigdog1055.com

WVNA-FM (105.5 FM) is a commercial radio station licensed to Muscle Shoals, Alabama, United States. The format is mainstream rock. On air, the station refers to itself as Rock 105.5, The Big Dog. WVNA-FM serves the Florence-Muscle Shoals Metropolitan Area. The station is owned by Mike Self and Parker Griffith, through licensee Singing River Media Group, LLC, and is part of a six station cluster operated by Singing River Media in North Alabama/Southern Tennessee.

The WVNA call letters stand for "(The) Voice of North Alabama".

Programming on the radio station includes Bob & Tom in the morning, local personality Ash mid-days, T.C. Kinkead afternoons and Alice Cooper at night. Other personalities on the station include Dee Snider, Bob Colburn, Harlan, Little Steven Van Zandt, Matt Pinfield and Full Metal Jackie.

The station's Program and music director is T.C. Kinkead. Brian Rickman is the Operations Manager.
