= WVNA (AM) =

- Tuscumbia, Alabama; United States
- Broadcast area: Florence-Muscle Shoals Metropolitan Area
- Frequency: 1590 kHz
- Branding: WVNA 96.7 & 1590

Programming
- Format: Conservative talk
- Affiliations: Premiere Networks; Salem Radio Network; Townhall News; Westwood One

Ownership
- Owner: Mike Self and Parker Griffith; (Singing River Media Group, LLC)
- Sister stations: WLAY (AM), WLAY-FM, WMXV, WMSR-FM, WVNA-FM

History
- First air date: April 5, 1955
- Call sign meaning: Voice of North Alabama

Technical information
- Licensing authority: FCC
- Facility ID: 19457
- Class: D
- Power: 1,000 watts (day); 55 watts (night)
- Transmitter coordinates: 34°40′40″N 87°43′15″W
- Translator: 96.7 W244EF (Florence)

Links
- Public license information: Public file; LMS
- Website: shoalstalk.com

WVNA (1590 kHz) is licensed to Tuscumbia, Alabama. The format is conservative talk. The station features syndicated talk programming. The station is owned by Mike Self and Parker Griffith through licensee Singing River Media Group, LLC.

The station ceased transmitting on December 15, 2014.

WVNA positioned itself as a radio station "where all sides have their say". Thus, the station aired both conservative and liberal talk show hosts.

The WVNA call letters stand for "(The) Voice of North Alabama".

Presently, the station's news director is Ron Jordan, Commander Chuck oversees the weather department and Brian Rickman is the program director.

Overnight, the station broadcast the syndicated Coast to Coast AM hosted by George Noory.

In late June 2010 WVNA and Shoals-area WLAY lost the lease on their combined transmitter site. The stations were off the air until a new site was located and facilities built. This station was transferred from URBan Radio to Kevin Wagner in January 2013. As of December 2014 the station is on the air but only on nighttime power 24/7. This station appears on the FCC silent list as of December 14, 2014, although it is reported to broadcast regularly. The station finally went fully silent in April 2015.

On December 7, 2015, Kevin Wagner-led URBan Radio filed a pleading with the FCC to keep the license for this station and WLAY active, claiming to have found a buyer for both stations; the request was granted on December 15. The stations collectively will have been off for exactly a year as of the 16th, which normally means they are automatically deleted by the FCC. As part of the request, URBan wants to return WVNA to the air from a temporary longwire installed on the WQLT-FM tower in Colbert County, with 2,000 watts. The station resumed broadcasting the next day, on the 16th, with rock music and WVNA-FM liners, although it is not a direct simulcast of the FM station. That simulcast is ongoing as of January 2017, when URBan filed an application to permanently relocate the station to the WVNA-FM tower nearby, on New Cut Road. That construction permit, which would decrease the night power to 43 watts, was granted on April 12, 2017.

Effective April 1, 2019, URBan Radio sold WVNA and five sister stations to Singing River Media Group, LLC for $1.275 million. In January 2020, WVNA changed their format from news/talk to a simulcast of mainstream rock-formatted WVNA-FM 105.5 Muscle Shoals.

As of August 2022, WVNA changed their format from a simulcast of mainstream rock-formatted WVNA-FM 105.5 Muscle Shoals back to conservative talk.

== Previous logo ==
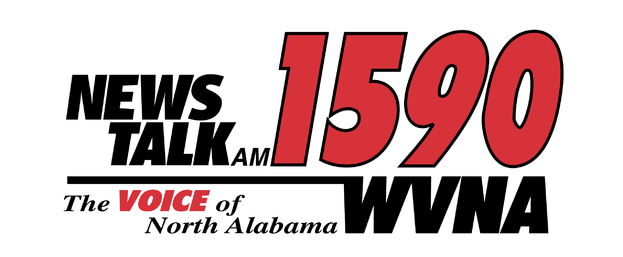
