= Sam Givhan =

American politician

Member of the Alabama Senate from the 7th district
- Incumbent
- Assumed office November 7, 2018
- Preceded by: Paul Sanford

Personal details
- Born: Samuel Houston Givhan; February 23, 1967 (age 59) Fort Sill, Oklahoma, U.S.
- Party: Republican
- Spouse: Heather King (m. 1992)
- Children: 6
- Education: Auburn University (BS); University of Alabama (JD)

Samuel Houston Givhan (born February 23, 1967) is an American politician. A Republican, he is a member of the Alabama Senate, representing the 7th district since 2018. Prior to his election in the Alabama Senate, he held several roles in the Madison County Republican Party, including acting as its finance director between 2013 and 2014, and as its chairman between 2014 and 2018.
