= WWON (AM) =

Radio station in Waynesboro, Tennessee

Coordinates: 35°18′30″N 87°44′42″W

- Waynesboro, Tennessee; United States
- Frequency: 930 kHz
- Branding: Big Country 92.7 FM & 930 AM

Programming
- Format: Country

Ownership
- Owner: Jukebox Media, LLC
- Sister stations: WWON-FM

History
- First air date: January 31, 1970 (as WAAN at 1480)
- Former call signs: WAAN (1970–1980); WNBG (1980–1987); WTNR (1987–2000)
- Former frequencies: 1480 kHz (1970–1987)
- Call sign meaning: W 1

Technical information
- Licensing authority: FCC
- Facility ID: 50127
- Class: D
- Power: 470 watts (day); 91 watts (night)
- Translator: 92.7 W224EC (Waynesboro)

Links
- Public license information: Public file; LMS
- Webcast: Listen Live
- Website: bigoldiesradio.com

WWON is a commercial AM radio station licensed to the city of Waynesboro, Tennessee, the seat of Wayne County, Tennessee. The station operates at the assigned frequency of 930 kHz, at a power output of 470 watts day, and 91 watts at night.

== History ==
=== The birth of WAAN AM 1480 ===
Wayne County's first radio station went on the air in January 1970, with studios located upstairs above Helton's Drug Store. "Orange Blossom Special" was the first song played on what was then the new 1480 WAAN radio. That first record was played by beloved former announcer and singer Neal "Tywhop" Jones.

In the mid-1970s the station changed hands and Grand Ole Opry members Ernie Ashworth and Ralph Davis became the owners for a brief period, along with Carl Swafford. In between the call letters WAAN and WTNR was the call letters WNBG.

=== Frequency move and callsign change ===
In the late 1980s, the station was moved to its present location in the old bank building on the Public Square in downtown Waynesboro. After years of paperwork the station changed frequency and call letters, and AM 930 WTNR was born. The call letters stood for Waynesboro, Tennessee Radio.

Aside from past owner Ernie Ashworth of Grand Ole Opry fame, country singer, actor, writer, and Waynesboro native Mark Collie also got his start on AM 930. Mark became a popular country music star. Also in the 1980s and early 1990s country singer Jacky Ward was an announcer. "Wile Willie" as he was called on the air, had success on the country charts with his hit "Big Blue Diamond". ("Wile" as in Wile E. Coyote of the "Roadrunner" cartoons.)

In July 1991, a new chapter in broadcasting began when WTNR-FM went on the air featuring hot new country music. AM 930 even simulcast the FM station until going all talk with syndicated talk shows. In 1994 the stations were sold to Ohio Broadcasting, and in 1998 the FM license was moved to Florence, Alabama. This left AM 930 in Waynesboro, as WTNR-FM became Froggy 94, and then The River 94.

Subsequently, all of Wayne County's other FM stations moved to Florence, leaving AM 930 as the only Wayne County radio station.

=== As WWON: the first time around ===
WTNR continued as a talk station until August 3, 2000 when the station was sold again and changed its call letters and format to WWON (W1) "Familiar Favorites." The station continued a great tradition of "Hometown Radio" providing Wayne County with local news, weather, and sports broadcasts. Due to these circumstances beyond their control, the owners were forced out of business. AM 930 WWON went dark in August 2005.

=== Rebirth after silence ===
==== Legends 930 ====
Six months after WWON went silent, Huntingdon, Tennessee, residents Chris and Karen Lash returned WWON to the air, purchasing the station in February 2006. The Lashes quickly returned AM 930 to its country roots when Legends 930 W-WON was born. The station featured classic country music, with local, national and statewide news every hour. An interactive, and updated website with local news headlines was restarted, and coverage of Wayne County Wildcat sports, and Tennessee Titans football was added to the programming line-up.

Also new to the radio station and county was a monthly newspaper, direct-mailed to homes in Waynesboro. The Advisor, Waynesboro's Hometown News and Shopper began, giving Waynesboro and the county positive stories of the people, places and things relative to the local community.

=== AM 930 The Farm ===
On January 8, 2007, the station changed its name and added current country songs to its rotation, in response to a web-based poll of its listeners. The station was then known as "AM 930 The Farm". The station was an affiliate of the Tennessee Titans radio network.

=== Kickin Country ===
On April 20, 2008 WWON was sold to Small Potatoes Broadcasting, LLC based in Nashville, Tennessee. The new owners kept a country format and changed to a new name: Kickin Country, KICKN.

== WWON now ==
=== Big Oldies 930 ===
In the summer of 2008 Small Potatoes Broadcasting, LLC. flipped the format to true oldies, calling the station "Big Oldies 930". The station derives a portion of its programming from Scott Shannon's The True Oldies Channel from ABC Radio.

On October 26, 2011, WWON was sold to Jukebox Media, LLC.
