= Keel Mountain (Alabama) =

Mountain in Alabama, United States

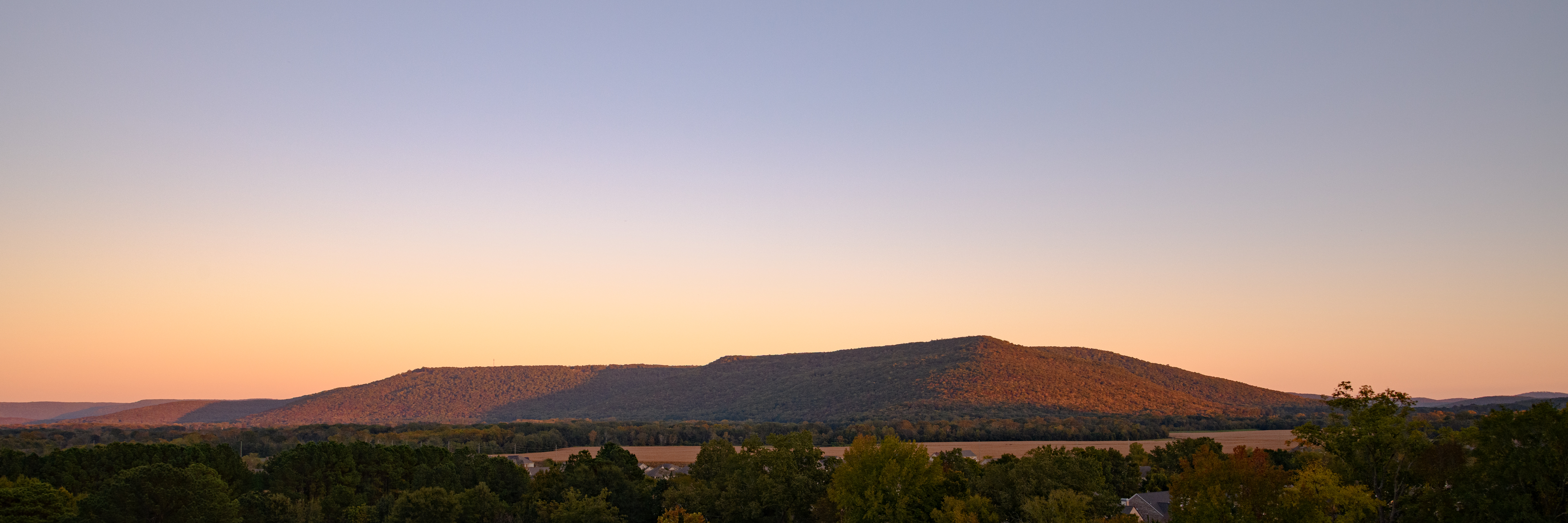
- The north-west side of Keel Mountain in October, 2025.

Highest point
- Elevation: 1,204 ft (367 m)
- Coordinates: 34°37′11″N 86°20′42″W

Geography
- Location within Alabama
- Location: Madison / Jackson counties, Alabama, US
- Topo map: USGS Grant

Keel Mountain is a mesa in Madison and Jackson Counties in Alabama. It is associated with the Cumberland Plateau, from which it is separated by the valley of the Paint Rock River. It is named for the early pioneers Jesse and Priscilla (Whitaker) Keel, who settled there from North Carolina prior to 1810.

== Bethel Spring Nature Preserve ==
A 360-acre nature preserve managed by the Land Trust of North Alabama is located on the south side of the mountain. The preserve has four short trails, that total under 2 miles in length. The preserve contains a large waterfall, one of the largest in Madison County.

In 2021, the United States Department of the Interior added the Bethel Spring Recreational Preserve Trail System to National Trails System's list of National Recreational Trails.

== Keel Mountain Preserve ==
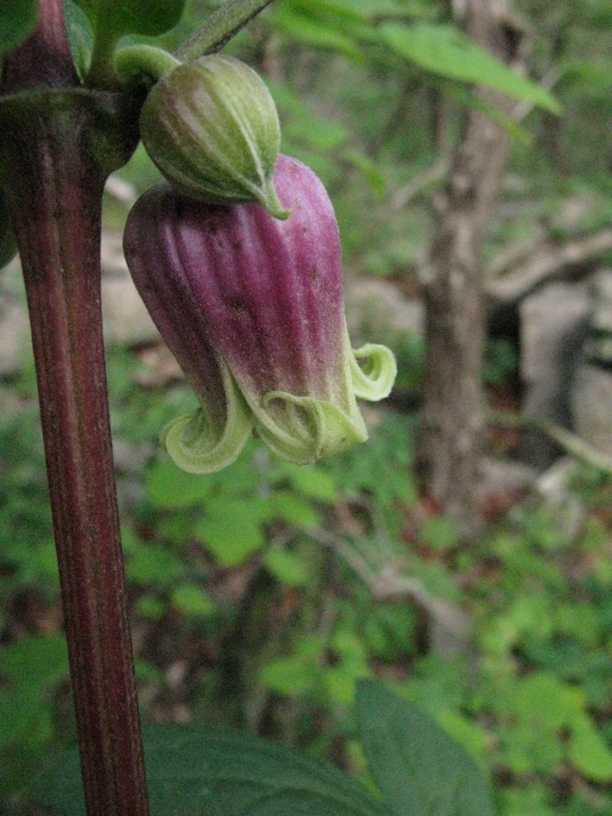
Clematis morefieldii

A 310-acre nature preserve managed by The Nature Conservancy is located on the west side of the mountain's south-facing slope. Within the preserve is a two-mile trail that leads to the Lost Sink, a large sinkhole with a small waterfall that flows into it.

The preserve was established to protect the federally endangered Clematis morefieldii, commonly known as the "Morefield's leather flower".
