= Phil Smith (Alabama politician) =

American politician (1931–2020)

Philip Hardy Smith (May 28, 1931 – May 3, 2020) was an American lawyer, businessman and politician.

Smith was born in Talladega, Alabama and went to Talladega High School. He received his bachelor's degree in biology from Sewanee: The University of the South and his master's degree from the University of Rochester in radiation biology. He received his law degree from the University of Alabama and was admitted to the Alabama bar. Smith practiced law in Talladega. Smith served in the Alabama House of Representatives as a Democrat from 1967 to 1974. He chaired the Talladega County Democratic Central Committee from 1978 to 1989 and served as a municipal judge in Talladega County from 1975 to 1988. Smith died in Tallageda, Alabama.
