= WWON-FM =

- Waynesboro, Tennessee; United States
- Broadcast area: Waynesboro, Tennessee
- Frequency: 100.7 MHz
- Branding: Big Oldies 100.7

Programming
- Format: Oldies

Ownership
- Owner: Charles Koblentz, Jr.; (Jukebox Media, LLC)
- Sister stations: WWON

History
- First air date: November 10, 2011 (as WMBZ)
- Former call signs: WMBZ (2011–2014)

Technical information
- Licensing authority: FCC
- Facility ID: 171033
- Class: A
- ERP: 6,000 watts
- HAAT: 94 meters
- Transmitter coordinates: 35°18′30″N 87°44′42″W (NAD 27)

Links
- Public license information: Public file; LMS
- Webcast: Listen Live
- Website: bigoldiesradio.com

WWON-FM (100.7 FM) is a radio station licensed to serve Waynesboro, Tennessee, United States. The station is owned by Jukebox Media. The station has an oldies format, which is simulcast on sister WWON AM 930.

== Sale of the station ==
In January 2014 Jukebox Media filed a $200,000 deal to purchase the station from Flinn Broadcasting. The deal was completed on April 7, 2014.
