= Paul Sanford =

American politician

Member of the Alabama Senate from the 7th district
- In office June 9, 2009 – November 7, 2018
- Preceded by: Parker Griffith
- Succeeded by: Sam Givhan

Personal details
- Born: September 13, 1967 (age 58) Huntsville, Alabama, U.S.
- Party: Republican
- Education: Culinary Institute of America (AOS)

Paul Sanford (born September 13, 1967) is an American politician. A Republican, he was a member of the Alabama State Senate from the 7th District, winning a special election in June 2009.
