= Parker Griffith =

American politician (born 1942)

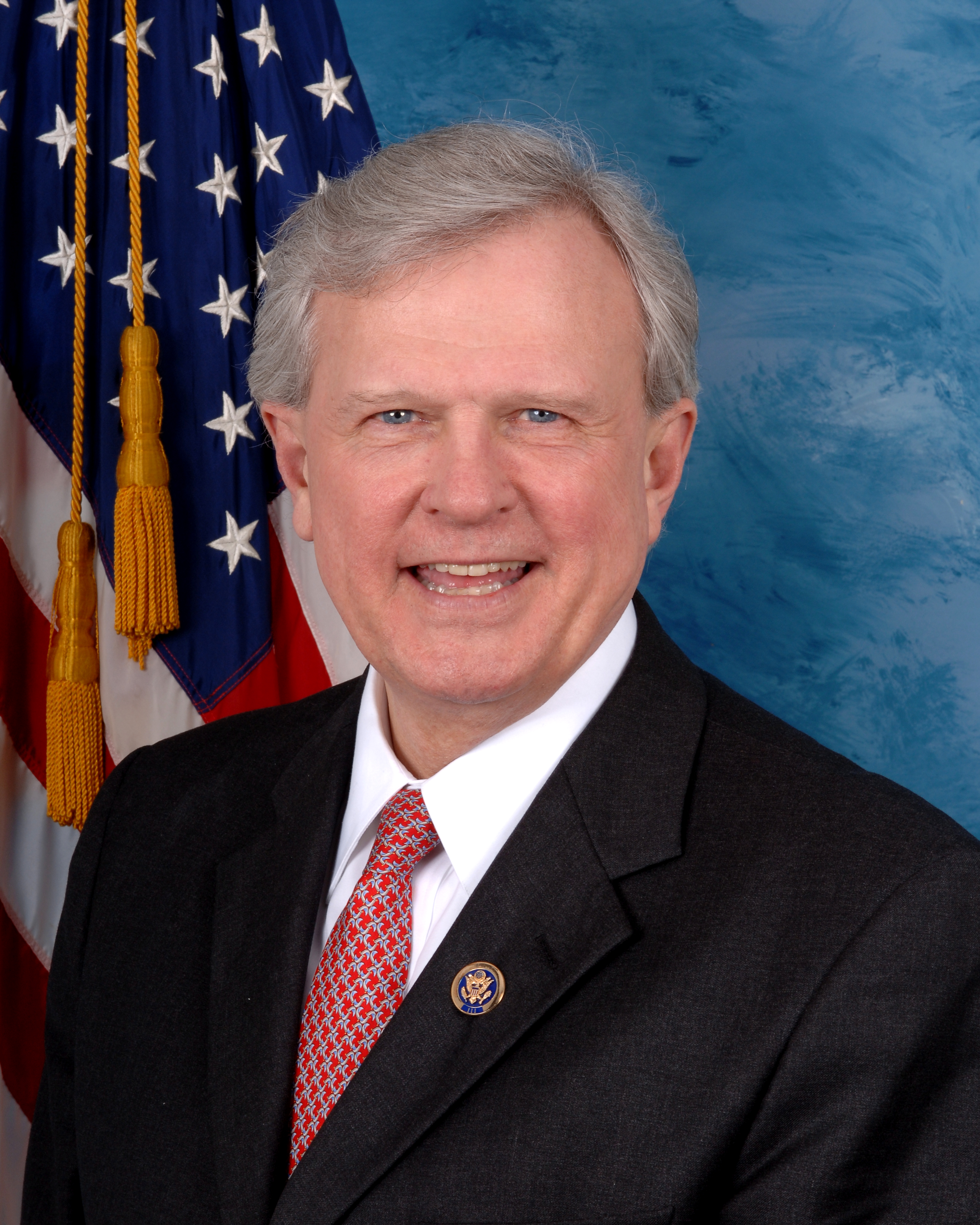

Member of the U.S. House of Representatives from Alabama's 5th district
- In office January 3, 2009 – January 3, 2011
- Preceded by: Bud Cramer
- Succeeded by: Mo Brooks

Member of the Alabama Senate from the 7th district
- In office November 8, 2006 – January 3, 2009
- Preceded by: Jeff Enfinger
- Succeeded by: Paul Sanford

Personal details
- Born: Rolf Parker Griffith Jr. August 6, 1942 (age 84) Shreveport, Louisiana, U.S.
- Party: Democratic (before 2009, 2014–present); Republican (2009–2013); Independent (2013–2014)
- Spouse: Virginia Griffith
- Children: 5
- Education: Louisiana State University, Baton Rouge (BS); Louisiana State University, New Orleans (MD)

Rolf Parker Griffith Jr. (born August 6, 1942) is an American politician, entrepreneur, and physician who served as the U.S. representative for Alabama's 5th congressional district from 2009 to 2011. A member of the Democratic Party, he served in the Alabama Senate from 2006 to 2009.

A lifelong Democrat, Griffith defected to the Republicans while serving in Congress on December 22, 2009. He ran for re-election in 2010 but was defeated in the Republican primary by Mo Brooks. Griffith ran against Brooks in a rematch in 2012 but was defeated by a larger margin. He later returned to the Democratic Party in 2014 and unsuccessfully ran for Governor of Alabama that year.

== Early life, education, and medical career ==
Griffith was born in Shreveport, Louisiana. He taught 7th-grade arithmetic for less than a year at T.H. Harris Junior High School (later Middle School) in Metairie in Jefferson Parish in suburban New Orleans prior to being admitted to medical school. He received his medical degree from the Louisiana State University Medical School in 1970 and served in residency at the University of Texas M. D. Anderson Cancer Center. After serving at the LSU Service Charity Hospital in New Orleans and a year of neurosurgery at the University of Texas Medical Branch (UTMB) in Galveston, Texas, Griffith began preparing to become a radiation oncologist, one who specializes in using radiation to cure cancer, training in radiation oncology through a combined program between UTMB and M.D. Anderson Cancer Center in Houston. He served as a Medical Corps captain in the U.S. Army Reserve from 1970 to 1973, while continuing his medical training at the LSU Service Charity Hospital in New Orleans.

Griffith was recruited on a "cold call" to Alabama and established the Huntsville Cancer Treatment Center. As a physician, he provided discounted care to patients who lacked insurance. Griffith also conducted several clinical trials in conjunction with the University of Alabama School of Medicine, and partnered with St. Jude Children's Research Hospital in Memphis, Tennessee. He retired from medicine in December 1992, though he still holds a license to practice in both Alabama and Texas. As of February 18, 2024 the Alabama board of Medical Examiners and the Medical Licensure Commission of Alabama hold no record for a licensed Parker Griffith.

== Early political career ==
Griffith unsuccessfully ran for mayor of Huntsville against the three-term incumbent, Loretta Spencer in 2004. He then won a seat in the Alabama State Senate, representing the 7th district. He carried 66% of the vote to his opponent's 34%.

During his term in the State Senate, he sponsored bills to promote investment in alternative fuels, cut taxes, and establish a Statewide Trauma Care System to speed up critical medical care.

== U.S. House of Representatives ==
=== Elections ===
2008

On March 22, 2008 Griffith announced that he would run for the open seat in the 5th District. The district's 9-term incumbent, fellow Democrat Bud Cramer, was not running for reelection. He won the June 2008 Democratic primary election with 90% of the vote, defeating physicist David Maker. Cramer had endorsed Griffith in the primary.

Griffith faced Republican Wayne Parker, an insurance agent from Huntsville, in the November election. Parker had sought this seat unsuccessfully twice before, in 1994 and 1996, losing both times to Bud Cramer.

The 5th was considered one of the few realistic chances for a Republican pickup in what was forecast to be a very bleak year for Republicans because of the district's and state's recent voting history. While Democrats still held most local offices as well as most state legislative seats in the area, the district's residents had become increasingly willing to support Republicans at the national and state level. It last supported a Democrat for president in 1984, and George W. Bush and John McCain won the district by wide double-digit margins in 2000, 2004 and, ultimately, 2008.

Due to these trends, most forecasters rated the district as a toss-up. CQ Politics forecast the race as 'No Clear Favorite', The Cook Political Report ranked it 'Democratic Toss-Up', and The Rothenberg Political Report rated it 'Pure Toss-Up'.

Griffith prevailed by taking 52 percent of the vote to Parker's 48 percent. He carried all but one of the district's seven counties. This came even as McCain (who carried the 5th with 61 percent of the vote) and Alabama Senator Jeff Sessions (whose seat was up for re-election) won every county in the district. His victory, and that of Bobby Bright in the 2nd District, gave Alabama two white Democratic congressmen for the first time since Glen Browder and Tom Bevill left the House in 1997.

2010

Griffith ran for re-election to the U.S. House of Representatives as a Republican in 2010, but was defeated in the June 1 Republican primary by Madison County Commissioner Mo Brooks. Brooks received 51% of the vote, narrowly avoiding a run-off. Griffith received 33%. Conservative activist Les Phillip received 16%.

2012

In January 2012, he filed for a rematch against Brooks in the Republican primary. He said of the incumbent, "We'll contrast my time in Congress with my opponent's time in Congress. The distinction is clear, he has wandered away from many of the issues people want us to address." Brooks defeated him in the rematch 71%–29%, a landslide margin of 42 points. He won all five of the counties.

2014

Supporters of Griffith circulated petitions to place him on the November ballot as an independent. Griffith considered running but decided against it.

=== Tenure ===
Griffith has stated that he leans conservative on a variety of issues, though not all. He states he is a fiscal conservative who has called repeatedly for reducing the national debt. He is a strong supporter of NASA and America's dominance in space.

Griffith voted against the Affordable Health Care for America Act, cap-and-trade legislation and the 2009 economic stimulus act.

==== Party switch ====
Griffith was a member of the Blue Dog Coalition, but on December 22, 2009, he announced he would become a Republican. He cited the health care bill as a major reason for his switch, and he had also clashed with the Democrats over fiscal and foreign policy. During his announcement, he stated:

I believe our nation is at a crossroads and I can no longer align myself with a party that continues to pursue legislation that is bad for our country, hurts our economy, and drives us further and further into debt.

The GOP had been courting Griffith since August, when he publicly criticized the Democratic House leadership in the wake of raucous town hall meetings in his district, stating that he wouldn't vote for Nancy Pelosi as Speaker as she is "divisive and polarizing". He also opposed the White House's decision to cancel a missile defense shield in Europe, which could have contributed to Huntsville's defense industry. His switch is the first time a member of Congress switched from the majority party to the minority party since New York Representative Michael Forbes' switch from Republican to Democrat in 1999. Forbes also lost his primary campaign following his switch. The 5th was one of the few districts in the former Confederacy that, at the time, had not elected a Republican since Reconstruction.

In January 2010, rebelling against his party switch, Griffith's congressional staff resigned en masse, including his chief of staff, legislative director, press secretary, and his intern. Shortly after switching parties, Griffith joined the Republican Study Committee, a caucus of conservative House Republicans.

Griffith's voting record veered sharply to the right after his switch. He'd garnered a 56 from the American Conservative Union in 2009, but in 2010 garnered a 95.

Upon Griffith's party switch, he became the first Republican to represent Alabama's 5th district since John Benton Callis, who was elected to a single term (1868-1870) during Reconstruction.

=== Committee assignments ===
- Committee on Energy and Commerce
  - Subcommittee on Communications, Technology and the Internet
  - Subcommittee on Energy and Environment
  - Subcommittee on Oversight and Investigations

=== Caucus memberships ===
- Missile Defense (co-chair)
- Modeling and Simulation
- NASA House Action Committee

== 2014 gubernatorial election ==
Griffith ran for Governor of Alabama in the 2014 election. He returned to the Democratic Party in February 2014, with the State Party voting to reinstate him. He was successful in obtaining the party's nomination but lost decisively to the incumbent, Robert J. Bentley, in the general election.

During the election, Griffith conducted an interview with radio show host Matt Murphy. On September 10, 2014, Murphy revealed that the two had an off-air altercation, during which Griffith called Murphy a "pussy", "piece of shit", and "motherfucker". Murphy also alleged that Griffith had threatened to "whip [Murphy's] ass". Griffith apologized for the incident.

== Post-election activities ==
During the 2022 United States Senate election in Alabama, Griffith publicly supported Republican candidate Katie Britt, stating he had one of her campaign signs in his yard. In April 2022, Griffith appeared on The Jeff Poor Show, a radio program, where he criticized Michael Durant, one of Britt's opponents in the election. During his appearance, Griffith diagnosed Durant with post-traumatic stress disorder without medical backing and compared Durant to Adolf Hitler and Mao Zedong. Durant's campaign responded with a statement calling on Britt to denounce Griffith's comments, calling Griffith's remarks "a slanderous attack on all veterans".

== Personal life ==
Griffith resides in Huntsville with his wife, Virginia. The couple has five children and 11 grandchildren (to date). He co-founded the Griffith Family Foundation, which awards cash grants to elementary school libraries in northern Alabama. Since its founding in 2005, the foundation has donated over $50,000 to area schools.

Griffith is an Episcopalian.

== Electoral history ==
Alabama's 5th Congressional District House Election, 2008
| Party | Candidate | Votes | % | ±% |
|---|---|---|---|---|
| Democratic | Parker Griffith | 158,324 | 52 | |
| Republican | Wayne Parker | 147,314 | 48 | |

Alabama Republican Primary, 5th Congressional District, 2010
| Party | Candidate | Votes | % |
|---|---|---|---|
| Republican | Mo Brooks | 35,746 | 51 |
| Republican | Parker Griffith | 23,525 | 33 |
| Republican | Les Phillip | 11,085 | 16 |

Alabama Republican Primary, 5th Congressional District, 2012
| Party | Candidate | Votes | % |
|---|---|---|---|
| Republican | Mo Brooks | 65,123 | 71 |
| Republican | Parker Griffith | 26,680 | 29 |

2014 Alabama gubernatorial election
| Party | Candidate | Votes | % | ±% |
|---|---|---|---|---|
| Republican | Robert J. Bentley (incumbent) | 750,231 | 63.56% | +5.66% |
| Democratic | Parker Griffith | 427,787 | 36.24% | −5.86% |
| Write-in | | 2,395 | 0.20% | N/A |
| Total votes | | 1,180,413 | 100.00% | N/A |
| Republican hold | | | | |

== See also ==
- List of American politicians who switched parties in office
- List of United States representatives who switched parties

U.S. House of Representatives
| Preceded by Bud Cramer | Member of the U.S. House of Representatives from Alabama's 5th congressional district 2009–2011 | Succeeded by Mo Brooks |
Party political offices
| Preceded by Ron Sparks | Democratic nominee for Governor of Alabama; 2014 | Succeeded by Walt Maddox |
U.S. order of precedence (ceremonial)
| Preceded by Bobby Bright as Former U.S. Representative | Order of precedence of the United States as Former U.S. Representative | Succeeded by James B. Longley Jr. as Former U.S. Representative |
