= Violence and controversies during the George Floyd protests =

- Part of the George Floyd protests
- Date: May 26, 2020 – 2022
- Location: United States (sporadic protests in other countries)

Police injuries included 140 during Memorial Day weekend in 2020 Chicago. Deaths, injuries and arrests
- Deaths: 19 (May 26–June 8, 2020)
- Arrested: 17,000+

Local protests in the Minneapolis–Saint Paul metropolitan area quickly spread nationwide in more than 2,000 cities and towns, as well as over 60 countries internationally in support of the Black Lives Matter movement. In Minneapolis, destruction of property began on May 26, 2020, with the protests involving vandalism and arson. Demonstrations in many other cities also descended into riots and widespread looting. There was police brutality against protesters and journalists. Property damage estimates resulting from arson, vandalism and looting ranged from $1 to $2 billion, eclipsing the highest inflation adjusted totals for the 1992 Los Angeles riots.

The George Floyd protests, a series of protests and unrest which began in Minneapolis, Minnesota, on May 26, 2020, in response to the murder of George Floyd by Minneapolis Police Department officer Derek Chauvin. An estimated 93%–96.3% of demonstrations were peaceful and nondestructive, involving no injuries or no property damage. However, police made arrests in about 5% of protest events (deploying chemical irritants in 2.5% of events); 3.7% of protest events were associated with property damage or vandalism (including damages by persons not involved in the actual demonstration); and protesters or bystanders were injured or killed in 1.6% of events. Clashes and other forms of violence were at various times initiated by protestors, by counterprotestors, and by police, and were usually driven by opportunistic criminals rather than organized extremist groups.

There have also been numerous reports and videos of aggressive police actions using physical force including "batons, tear gas, pepper spray and rubber bullets on protesters, bystanders and journalists, often without warning or seemingly unprovoked." These incidents have provoked "growing concern that aggressive law enforcement tactics intended to impose order were instead inflaming tensions." The police responded that such tactics are necessary to prevent vandalism and arson, and that police officers have been assaulted with rocks and water bottles. Amnesty International issued a press release calling for the police to end excessive militarized responses to the protests.

== Iconoclasm and name changes ==
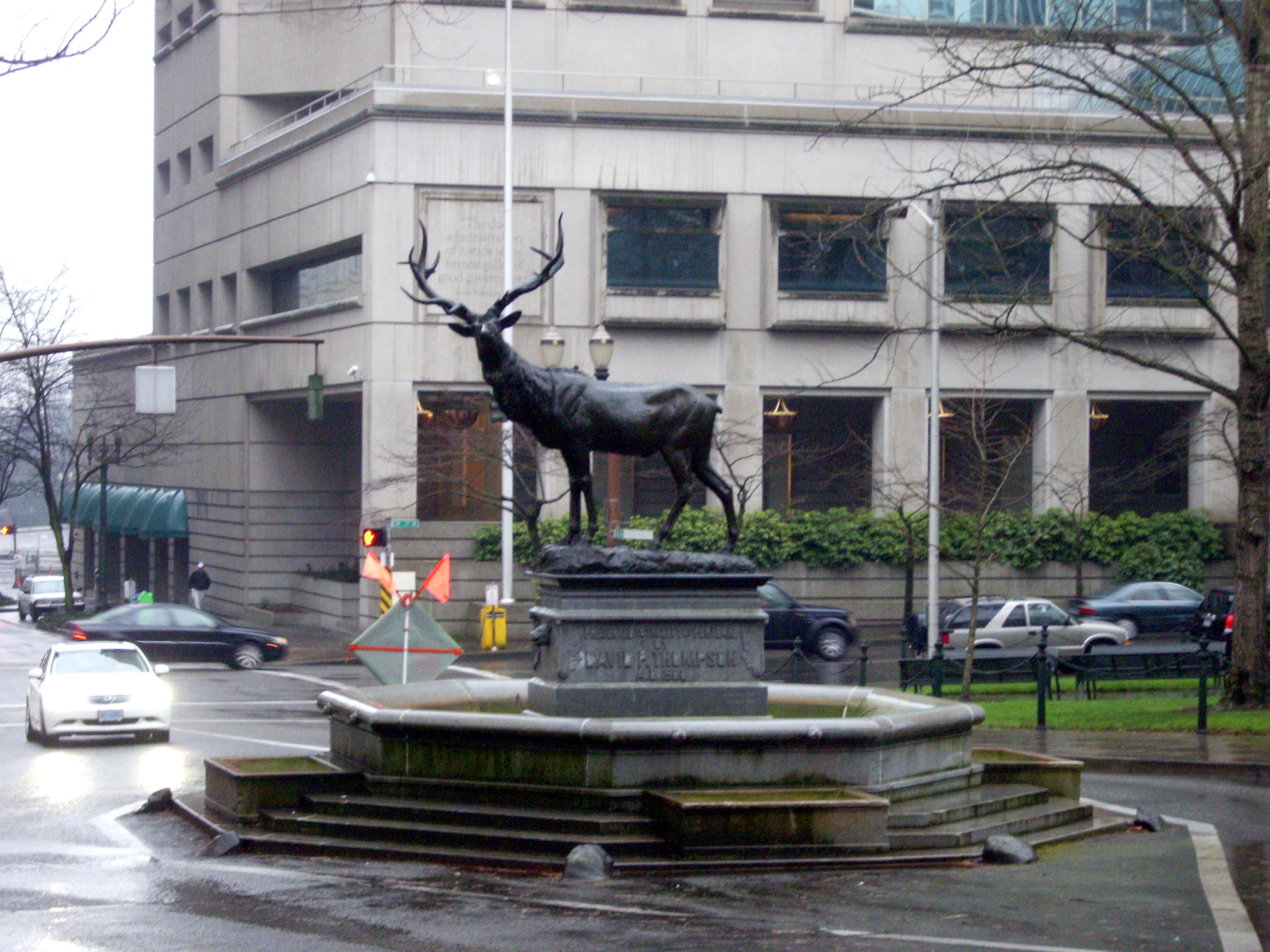
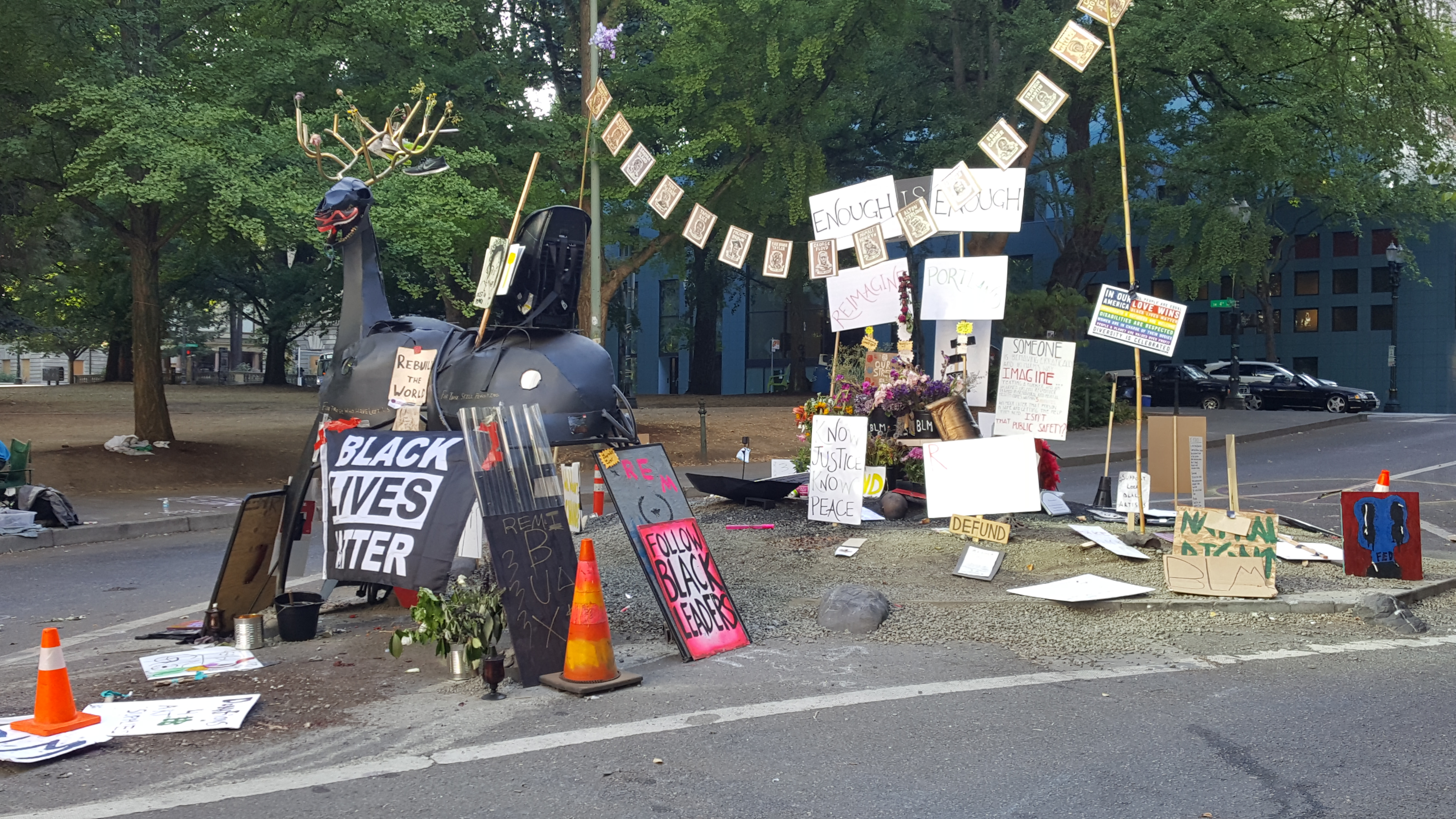
The Thompson Elk Fountain in Portland, Oregon (top) was damaged and removed during protests in July 2020. It was temporarily replaced with a new sculpture (bottom) by activists.

The social unrest surrounding the protests resulted in reinvigorated efforts by activists and sympathetic institutions to physically relocate or remove controversial monuments and memorials across the world associated with colonialism and slavery, or otherwise deemed racially or culturally insensitive. Many monuments were simply vandalized by protesters as well. In the U.S., renaming and removal efforts mostly surrounded monuments, relics, and memorials to the Confederacy and historical figures often associated with racism, segregation, or slavery, such as Christopher Columbus, Thomas Jefferson, and Albert Pike. Outside of the U.S., monuments and symbols associated with European colonialism and the Atlantic slave trade were also vandalized or removed.

Similarly, various public and private organizations, institutions, and groups took to renaming buildings, streets, and brands due to public pressure or on their own initiative.

== Events outside the United States ==
=== In Belgium ===
During a demonstration in Brussels on June 7, police officers were assaulted, and protesters broke the windows of several shops, which were subsequently looted. 28 police officers were injured, one of them seriously. During and after the demonstration, 239 arrests were made, including 7 judiciary arrests. The handling of the demonstration, which was tolerated but not authorized by burgomaster Philippe Close despite coronavirus lockdown measures, was criticized by various politicians. Close announced that the city of Brussels would sue the "delinquents," and Belgian Prime Minister Sophie Wilmès, who supported the demonstration, expressed her regrets as to the way it unfolded. Denis Ducarme, the minister in charge of self-employed workers, deplored the rampage and pillage of "numerous shops," and announced that he would ask the Prime Minister and the Minister of the Interior to explain why police were initially asked not to intervene.

In Antwerp on the same day, between 100 and 150 demonstrators were arrested after refusing to leave a public square in compliance with social distancing measures.

Scientists and health officials denounced the various demonstrations across the country, calling them dangerous for public health, with physical distance impossible to maintain. They also deplored the signal sent by the demonstrations to the Belgian people, who were asked to respect stringent limitations of their freedoms in order to slow the spread of the coronavirus pandemic.

=== In Canada ===
May 31: In Montreal, Quebec, thousands attended a protest outside the Montreal police headquarters. While the protests were largely peaceful, it eventually escalated into unrest, and police fired tear gas. Several store windows were damaged, and some items were stolen. Eleven arrests were made, including one for assault.

June 5: In Ottawa a few minor physical altercations between protesters and police occurred during the No Peace Until Justice march, a protest and march in the city center, which was attended by Prime Minister of Canada Justin Trudeau.

July 4: In Winnipeg, Manitoba, following a Black and Indigenous Lives Matter rally, two women attacked protestors with hockey sticks.

=== In France ===
June 2: In Paris, at the end of a large unauthorized demonstration that protested the murder of George Floyd and the death of Adama Traoré, rioters destroyed street furniture and set fire to construction equipment, and a large number of demonstrators attempted to block a boulevard. Police dispersed the crowd with tear gas and arrested 18 people.

June 3: In Toulouse, where the community feared violence following the chaos during the demonstration in Paris, small groups of hooded individuals degrading street furniture and setting fire to trash cans were pursued by riot police, who used tear gas. A paint bucket was thrown at the town hall, smashing a window and damaging the parquet floor, leading the mayor to express his anger and declare that his office would file a complaint. According to an unnamed witness, a small group of demonstrators moved on the police while it was retreating at the end of the demonstration. In total, four arrests were made.

June 6: In Metz, demonstrators attempted to force open the courthouse's doors, and threw a stone at the prosecutor of the Republic, lightly injuring his face. Four members of law enforcement were injured, and 13 protestors were arrested.

June 30: In Paris, an American confederate flag was spotted at the window of a police station, leading to speculation that it was displayed in opposition to the protests and the Black Lives Matter movement. Analysis of Google Street View images proved that the flag was displayed in the same window in July 2014, although the flag was missing in images from subsequent years.

=== In the United Kingdom ===
June 3: In the evening, following the demonstration at Hyde Park in Central London, clashes erupted as part of the protest group advanced further into Central London on their way to Parliament Square. Protesters climbed onto window sills on the walls of the HM Treasury building, spraying Black Lives Matter graffiti on the Treasury and surrounding buildings. Thirteen people were arrested after physical altercations broke out outside the gates to Downing Street. Temporary barriers and bottles were thrown over the gates, and groups of protesters attempted to breach them. Objects including signs and a traffic cone were thrown at police.

June 6: In Central London, protests outside Downing Street started peacefully but later turned violent after a group started throwing bottles and other objects at the police. Mounted police were eventually sent in to push the protesters back, one mounted officer fell from her horse after it ran into a traffic light. In all, 14 police officers were injured during the clashes, including two with serious injuries, and at least 14 protesters were arrested.

June 7: In Central London, BLM protesters clashed with police near King Charles Street, forcing the deployment of the Met's public order unit to quell the violence. At least one policeman suffered an injury to his head.

June 13: An official Black Lives Matter protest was cancelled in London due to concerns that it could be countered by far-right groups, after right-wing activist movement the Democratic Football Lads Alliance had called for people to travel to London to protect monuments. Hundreds of counter-protesters, including members of far-right groups, gathered at several statue sites in London, and clashed with the police, leading to over a hundred arrests and the injury of at least six police officers.

On the same day, in Newcastle, counter-protesters hurled smoke bombs, bottles, flares and fireworks at Black Lives Matter protesters and Northumbria Police officers resulting in 13 arrests and 5 Black Lives Matter protesters being hospitalised.

== Events within the United States ==
=== Washington, D.C., riots (May 29 – June 1, 2020) ===
May 29: On the heels of violence in Minneapolis, Minnesota, hundreds of protestors gathered at the U.S. Capitol on Friday, May 29, 2020, reaching "close to the doorstep of the White House," as "demonstrators tussled with Secret Service and other law enforcement officers," according to NBC reporter Jonathan Allen. Media reports are unclear about what occurred on the night of May 29–30, 2020. However, CNN reported "if the condition at the White House is elevated to RED and the President is moved to the Emergency Operations Center[,] Melania Trump, Barron Trump[,] and any other first family members would be moved as well." CNN also reported that due to the events occurring outside the White House, President Trump, the First Lady, and Barron Trump were all moved into the safety bunker and held there for a little under an hour. The Twitter hashtag "#BunkerBoy" and news stories regarding the hashtag immediately arose, mocking President Trump with accusations of running away from "protestors."

May 30: On the morning of Saturday, May 30, 2020, President Donald Trump voiced his support for the right of "every citizen to live without violence, prejudice or fear," adding that the voice of "law abiding citizens must be heard and heard very loudly" as well as stating during a speech later during the day that "I stand before you as a friend and ally to every American seeking justice and peace." President Trump strongly condemned the nighttime violence, burning, looting, and assault which occurred, stating his "firm opposition to anyone exploiting this tragedy to loot, rob, attack and menace. Healing, not hatred, justice, not chaos, are the mission at hand." While officially disagreeing with President Trump, Democratic Mayor of D.C. Muriel Bowser agreed with the widely popular sentiment, stating she was "sending a very clear message to people that they have a right to exercise their first amendment rights [of speech], but not to destroy our city. So we saw a level of destruction and mayhem among some that was maddening."

That night, Saturday, May 30, 2020, a portion of Lafayette Square served as a dividing line between police and the hundreds of violent protestors. According to The Guardian's reporters who were on the ground, "hundreds of demonstrators on Saturday circled the White House grounds [...] overcame barriers near the White House and entered the park in front of it, but were driven out by police wielding shields, batons and pepper spray." Demonstrators "repeatedly attempted to knock over security barriers and vandalized six Secret Service vehicles," as well as throwing "bricks, rocks, bottles, fireworks and other items at officers." Secret Service personnel were "directly physically assaulted as they were kicked, punched[,] and exposed to bodily fluids," and at least 60 Secret Service members were injured.

The Secret Service issued a statement via Twitter the following day summarizing the events which occurred that night and closed the statement by stating: "The Secret Service respects the right to assemble, and we ask that individuals do so peacefully for the safety of all."

May 31: D.C. Mayor Muriel E. Bowser imposed an 11 p.m. curfew and activated the National Guard due to the ongoing and escalation of violence, fire, and physical attacks, and attempts to breach barriers at the White House. According to on the ground reporting, protestors "faced off" against the police in Lafayette square after curfew when "a few firecrackers were hurled from the crowd" and police responded with tear gas and rapidly advancing toward the crowd. The violence on the evening of May 31, 2020 "spiraled out of control again," according to The New York Times.

The protestors took over the portion of Lafayette Square which served as the dividing line the night before, though as the night progressed well past curfew, the police were able to push crowds back to H Street, where the hundreds of rioters began " a giant bonfire in front of St. John's Church." St. John's Church, an historic 1858 church across the street from the White House, was also set on fire. Also near the White House, the demonstrators overturned and destroyed a car, set fire to a vehicle on I Street, set road signs on fire, and scattered on the streets surrounding the White House and set numerous fires, firing three projectiles into a building 100 yards from the White House and breaking place glass windows. NBC Washington recorded video of smoke from multiple fires around the Washington Monument.

Democratic strategist and consultant Adam Parkhomenko shot and posted a video showing fire and thick smoke behind graffiti-covered cement barriers to his Twitter, captioning the video tweet by stating "It looks like a war zone outside the White house." An aerial photo and footage of the capital with numerous fires spread online and internationally, with headlines in the U.K. such as "Washington DC in flames as protesters start fires near White House." The Toronto Star published an article titled "American cities on edge as fires burn near the White House amid protests." Some local media around the United States Capitol, in Washington D.C., Maryland, and Virginia, posted clips of the aerial footage online. The Twitter hashtag "#BunkerBoy" and news stories regarding the Twitter continued.

=== Deaths ===
According to Forbes, as of June 8, 2020, at least 19 people died during the protests.

Name	Age	City	Date	Sources
Calvin Horton Jr.	43	Minneapolis, MN	May 27	
Oscar Lee Stewart Jr.	30	Minneapolis, MN	May 28	
Javar Harrell	21	Detroit, MI	May 29	
David Patrick Underwood	55	Oakland, CA	May 29	
Barry Perkins	29	St. Louis, MO	May 30	
James Scurlock	22	Omaha, NE	May 30	
Marvin Francois	50	Kansas City, MO	May 31	
John Tiggs	32	Chicago, IL	May 31	
Chris Beaty	38	Indianapolis, IN	May 31	
Dorian Murrell	18	Indianapolis, IN	May 31/June 1	
David McAtee	53	Louisville, KY	June 1	
Italia Marie Kelly	22	Davenport, IA	June 1	
Marquis M. Tousant	23	Davenport, IA	June 1	
Jose Gutierrez	28	Cicero, IL	June 1	
Victor Cazares Jr.	27	Cicero, IL	June 1	
Jorge Gomez	25	Las Vegas, NV	June 1	
—	20s	Philadelphia, PA	June 2	
—	24	Philadelphia, PA	June 2	
David Dorn	77	St. Louis, MO	June 2	
Sean Monterrosa	22	Vallejo, CA	June 2	
Robert Forbes	50	Bakersfield, CA	June 3	
Horace Lorenzo Anderson jr.	19	Seattle, WA	June 20	
Antonio Mays	16	Seattle, WA	June 29	
Summer Taylor	24	Seattle, WA	July 4	
Jessica Doty Whitaker	24	Indianapolis, IN	July 5	
Garrett Foster	28	Austin, TX	July 25	
Aaron "Jay" Danielson	40	Portland, OR	August 29	

==== May ====
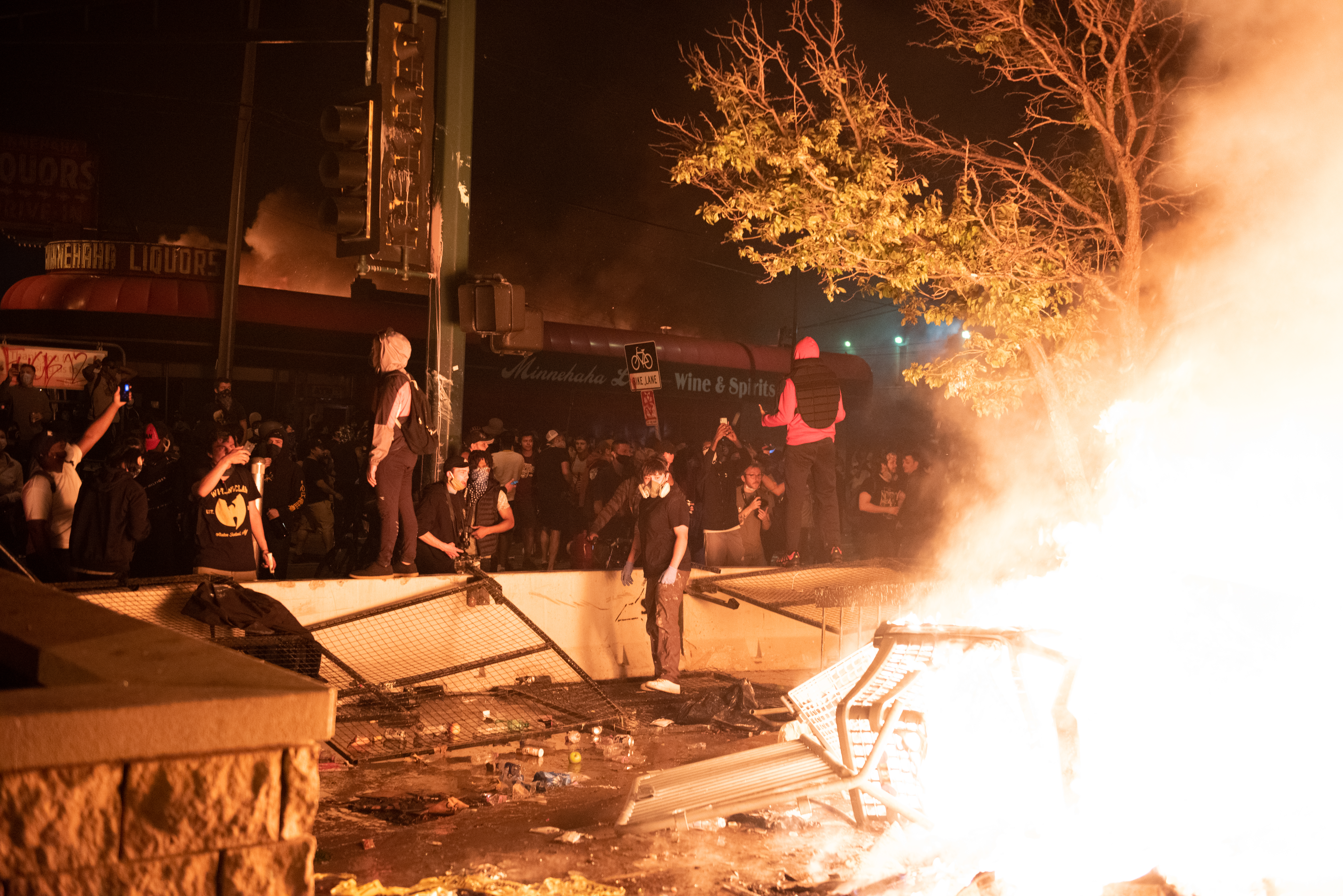
Rioters in front of a burning police precinct in Minneapolis, May 28, 2020

May 27: In Minneapolis, one mile (1.6 km) from the main protest site, Calvin Horton Jr. died after being shot at a pawn shop while he was looting. The owner of the pawn shop was initially arrested at the scene, and later pled self-defense. After a six-month investigation by the Minneapolis Police Department, no charges were filed against the shop owner due to lack of witness cooperation and lack of evidence, video footage and the weapon having been stolen by the other looters. Also on May 27, a man known as "Umbrella Man" dressed in black, and gas mask, carrying an umbrella and sledgehammer, was recorded on video breaking windows of an AutoZone store, spray painting graffiti, and encouraging looting. Some protesters confronted him and asked him to stop. Initial claims that the "Umbrella Man" was a Saint Paul police officer were debunked by surveillance video released by the Saint Paul Police Department. Police later received an anonymous tip via email that the man may be a 32-year-old man with ties to white supremacist organizations, according to an affidavit obtained by the media. However, the suspect in question has not been charged and the identity of the "Umbrella Man" remains unconfirmed.

May 28: In Minneapolis, on July 20, federal and state authorities recovered a body—which appeared to have suffered thermal injuries—at a pawn shop that was torched during protests a month prior. Max It Pawn, located several blocks east of the city's third precinct station and in an area of heavy rioting, was destroyed by fire on May 28. In June, a 25-year-old man from Rochester, Minnesota was federally charged with arson for the fire at the pawn shop. On October 20, the body was officially identified as that of 30 year old Oscar Lee Stewart Jr. Stewart died from thermal injury and inhalation of products of combustion.

===== May 29 =====
- In Downtown Detroit, a 21-year-old man was killed when his car was fired upon. He was shot in the middle of police brutality demonstrations, although police claimed the incident had no connection to the protests.
- In Oakland, California, amid unrest, a Federal Protective Service officer, David Patrick Underwood, was fatally shot outside a federal courthouse in a drive-by attack that also wounded another guard. Underwood had been providing security at the courthouse during a protest. The Department of Homeland Security labeled the shooting an act of domestic terrorism. Boogaloo movement member Steven Carrillo was charged with the murder on June 16. He was also implicated in the murder of a Santa Cruz County deputy. The white van allegedly used in the murder had "Boog" and "I became unreasonable" written in blood on the vehicle's hood. Investigators also found Boogaloo symbols including a ballistic vest with a US flag with an igloo instead of stars.

===== May 30 =====
- In St. Louis, Missouri, 29-year-old protester Barry Perkins died after being run over by a FedEx truck that was fleeing from looters.
- In Omaha, Nebraska, 22-year-old protester James Scurlock was fatally shot outside of a bar. The shooter was Jacob Gardner, the bar-owner, who had a scuffle with some protesters and fired several shots, one of which killed Scurlock; the altercation outside and shooting were caught on surveillance video. Two days later, authorities announced that there would be no charges for the bar's owner and that he had opened fire in self-defense. However, after pushback, the matter was referred to a grand jury for review.

===== May 31 =====
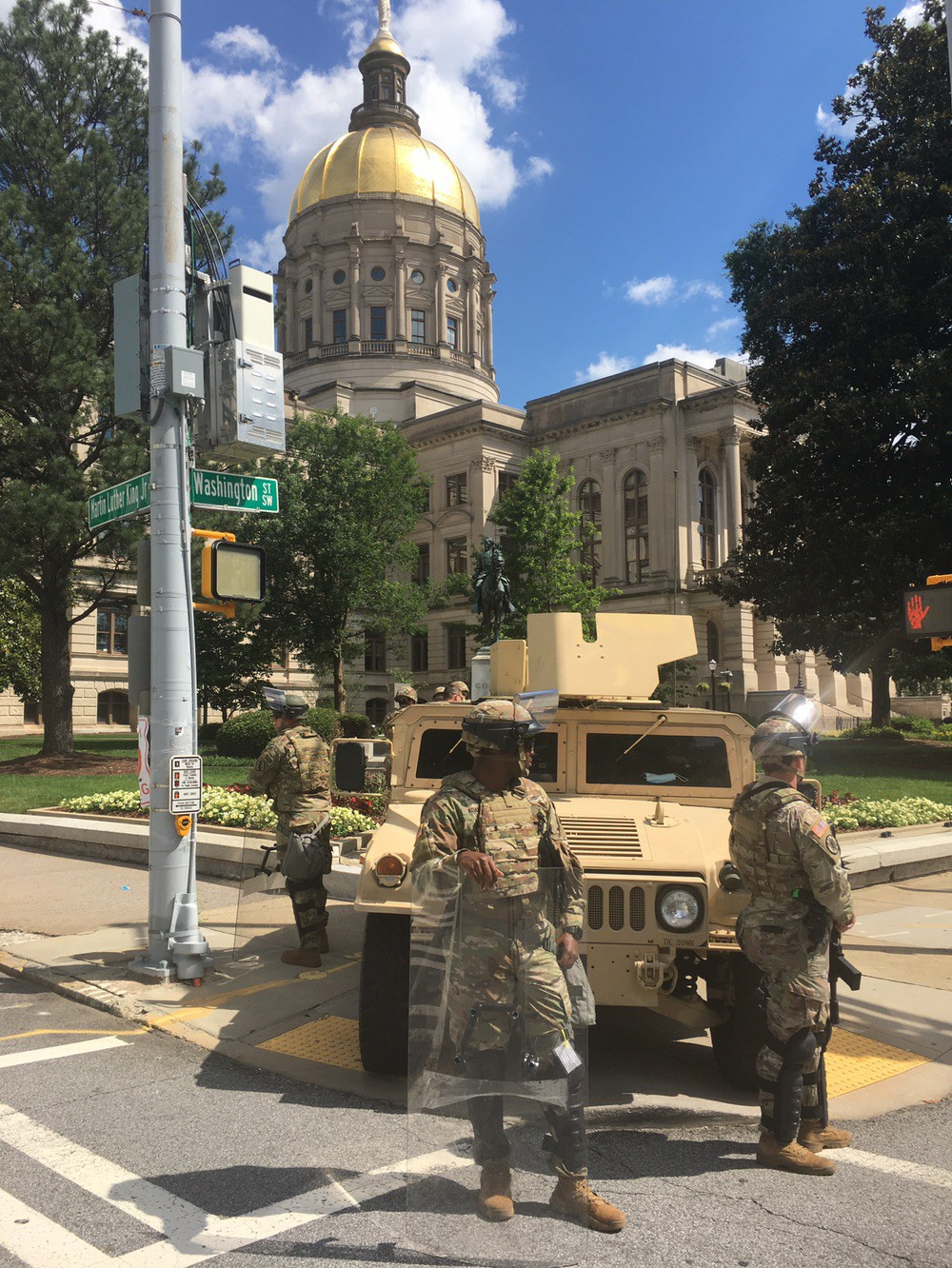
Georgia National Guard protecting the state capitol building, May 31, 2020

- In Kansas City, Missouri, 50-year-old Marvin Francois was shot and killed by robbers while picking up one of his sons from a protest.
- In Chicago, 32-year-old John Tiggs was fatally struck in the abdomen by shots fired inside a Metro by T-Mobile store while walking into the building to pay his bill during lootings in the city's South Side.
- In Indianapolis, two people were fatally shot in the vicinity of protests or riots downtown. One of them was 18-year-old Dorian Murrell, killed around 2:30am on June 1; a 29-year-old man turned himself in to the police, maintaining Murrell had pushed him down, and was subsequently charged with murder on June 2. The other was 38-year-old Chris Beaty, a local business owner, who was shot shortly before midnight May 31.

==== June ====
===== June 1 =====
- In Louisville, local restaurateur David McAtee was killed as a Louisville Metro Police and Kentucky National Guard curfew patrol fired at him. Authorities stated that the patrol returned gunfire after McAtee fired at them. McAtee's gunshot occurred after the patrol appeared to fire a pepper ball into McAtee's restaurant, nearly striking his niece in the head. According to McAtee's sister, the gathering was not a protest but rather a regularly scheduled social gathering at which McAtee served food from his barbecue restaurant. An investigation of the killing is ongoing. LMPD Chief Steve Conrad was fired later that day, as officers and troops involved in the shooting did not wear or failed to activate body cameras. Louisville Mayor Greg Fischer admitted that the city had shown an "inability to apply [curfew] evenly."
- In Davenport, Iowa, two people were fatally shot on a night with significant rioting. One of the victims was 22-year-old Italia Marie Kelly, killed in an apparent random shooting as she was leaving a demonstration. Another person, Marquis M. Tousant, was found dead at the scene of an ambush on an unmarked police truck that left a police officer wounded.
- In Cicero, Illinois, two men were fatally shot in separate incidents following an "afternoon of unrest"; this was confirmed by Cicero Police. Town spokesman Ray Hanania said the shots were fired by "outside agitators." The two men were both described as bystanders and were identified as 28-year-old Jose Gutierrez and 27-year-old Victor Cazares Jr.
- In Las Vegas, police shot and killed Jorge Gomez, who was walking among protesters and reportedly reached for his firearm when he was shot.

===== June 2 =====
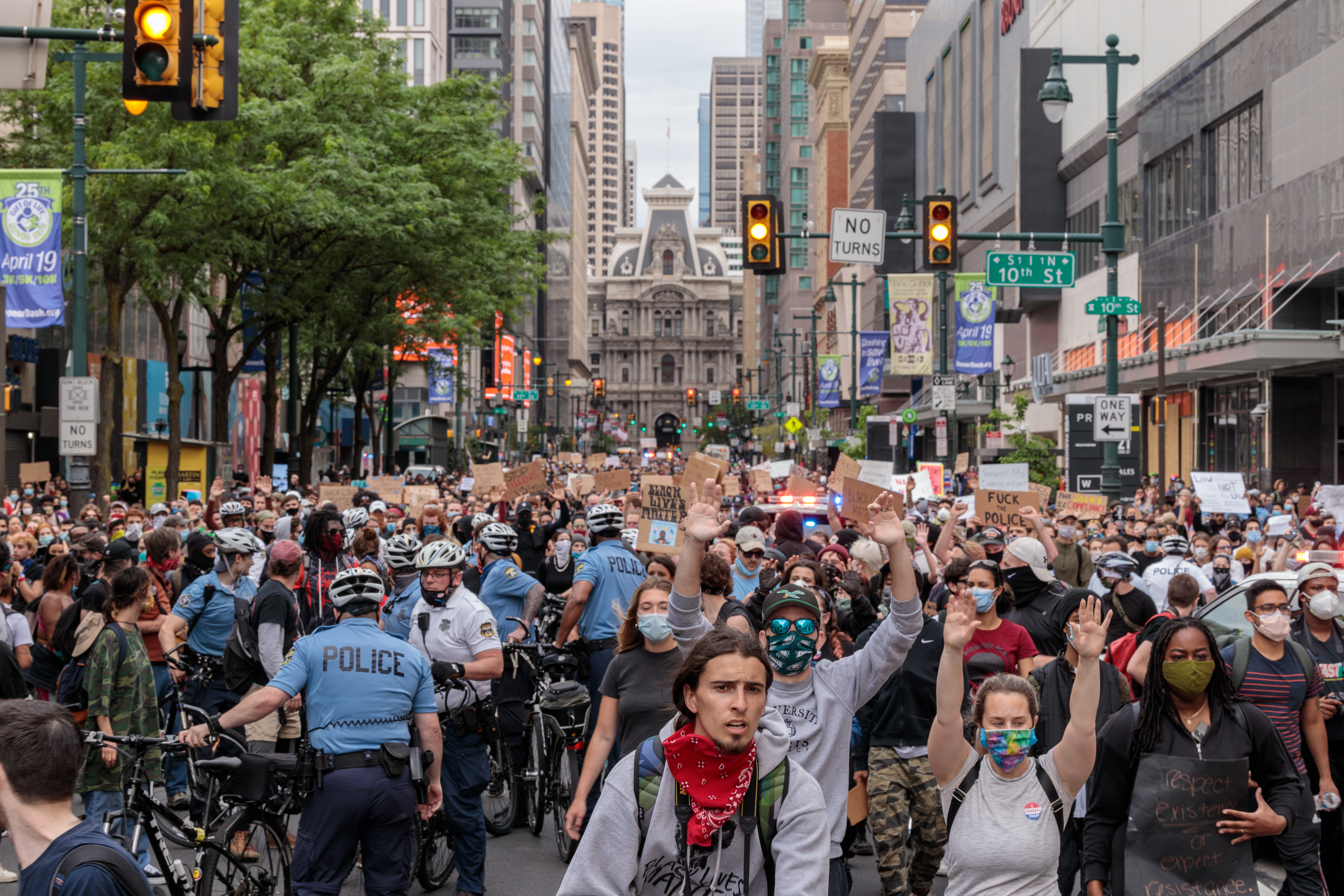
Police and protesters in Philadelphia, June 2, 2020

- In Philadelphia, two deaths occurred during the fourth day of unrest. A man in his twenties was fatally shot by the owner of the gun shop Firing Line Inc., while trying to break into the store in the south section of the city. Mayor Jim Kenney said he was "deeply troubled" by the killing and that he did not condone vigilantism. In a separate incident, a 24-year-old man was severely injured after attempting to use an explosive device to destroy an ATM. He was rushed to a local hospital before being pronounced dead.
- In St. Louis, 77-year-old retired police captain David Dorn was shot and killed by looters at a pawn shop. The shooting was streamed on Facebook Live.
- In Vallejo, California, Sean Monterrosa, a 22-year-old man, was shot and killed by police while on his knees. Monterrosa lifted his hands, which revealed a 15-inch hammer tucked in his pocket police said they mistook for a handgun. A police officer in a vehicle then fired on him five times through the windshield. Monterrosa later died at a local hospital. The police were responding to a call over alleged looting at a Walgreens, according to police chief Shawny Williams. The day after his death police revealed that "there had been an 'officer-involved shooting'" at a press conference, yet declined to offer further details, including the name of the officer involved. The event reportedly sparked intense outrage in the Bay Area, particularly in Vallejo, which was identified as having a long history of police violence, excessive force complaints, and high-profile killings like the shooting of Willie McCoy.

===== June 3–30 =====
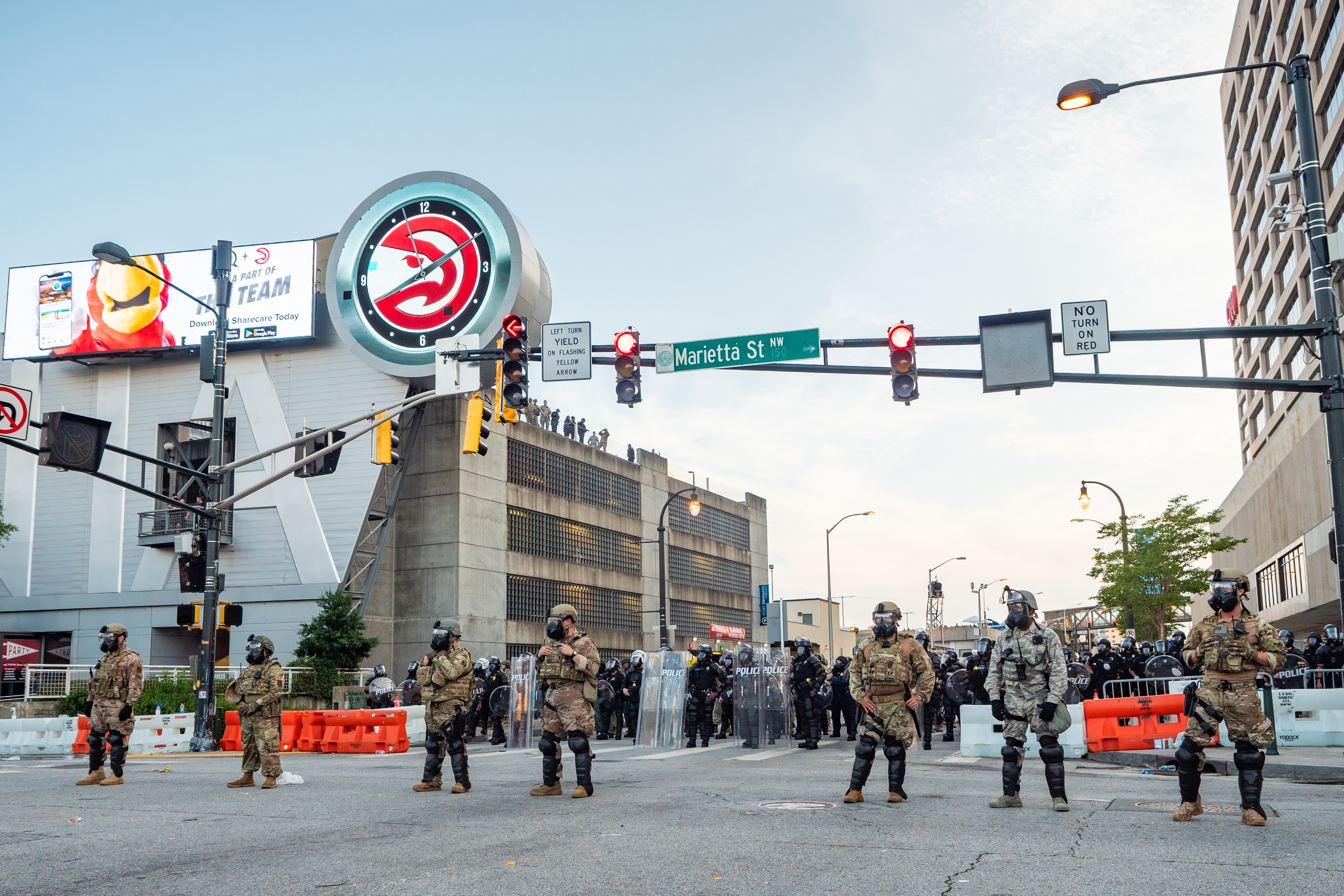
Riot police and Georgia National Guard at Centennial Olympic Park during protests in Atlanta, June 5, 2020

June 3: In Bakersfield, California, Robert Forbes, a 50-year-old man was killed after being struck by a vehicle while marching between California Avenue and Oak Street. The incident was caught on video and distributed widely on social media. Forbes was transported to Kern Medical Center, where he remained in critical condition for three days before dying. Police deny that Forbes was hit intentionally, while others dispute this claim. The police did not restrain the driver with handcuffs and allowed him to smoke a cigarette, which caused indignation on social media. A candlelight vigil was held for Forbes on June 6.

June 20: In Seattle, a 19-year-old man, Lorenzo Anderson, was killed and another person was hospitalized with life-threatening injuries after being fired on multiple times inside the city's Capitol Hill Autonomous Zone. Police stated they were denied entry to the area to render aid; instead, Capitol Hill Organized Protest medics took the two victims to Harborview Medical Center. A later investigation by KUOW showed that miscommunication between Seattle Police and Seattle Fire delayed city response to the victim.

June 29: In Seattle, a 16-year-old boy was killed and a 14-year-old was critically injured in their Jeep Grand Cherokee after being shot in the Capitol Hill Organized Protest (CHOP) zone.

==== July – August ====
July 4: In Seattle, 24-year-old Summer Taylor died after being hit by a vehicle while protesting on Interstate 5. A second person also hit was in critical condition. A suspect was taken into custody a few hours later after the incident.

July 5: In Indianapolis, 24-year old Jessica Doty Whitaker was killed after she, her fiancé, and two other friends got into an argument with another group of people regarding the Black Lives Matter movement. The argument between the two armed groups allegedly began when someone in Whitaker's group used a slang version of the "N-word." Whitaker responded to chants of "Black lives matter" by saying "all lives matter". Although her fiancé seemingly deescalated the situation, as the two groups were parting, Whitaker was shot and later died in the hospital.

July 25: In Downtown Austin, 28-year old Garrett Foster was murdered by Daniel Perry, after Perry drove into a group of protesters at a Black Lives Matter protest. The incident happened around 9:52 p.m. near East Sixth Street and Congress Avenue, according to Austin-Travis County EMS. Police said initial reports indicate that Foster was carrying an AK-47 style rifle, and was pushing his fiancée's wheelchair moments before he was killed. Foster identified with the boogaloo movement and had expressed anti-racist, libertarian, and anti-police views in his Facebook posts. Witnesses on the ground reported a driver accelerating their vehicle into a crowd of people. The suspect then pulled out his own firearm and shot Foster. Foster was then taken to the hospital where he was pronounced dead. The driver accused of shooting Foster was brought in by police for questioning, and his handgun and car were secured for evidence. The driver was released pending further investigation. Two memorials to Foster were built in downtown Austin within 24 hours of his death. On July 28, one of the memorials was defaced by an unidentified person.

August 29: In Portland, Oregon, Aaron J. Danielson was shot in the chest and killed on the night of August 29, amidst protests and riots in the city. Danielson wore a hat with the insignia of Patriot Prayer, a far-right group based in Vancouver, Washington that has clashed with protesters in the past. Michael Forest Reinoehl, responsible for the shooting, who was an anti-fascist activist and self-described supporter of antifa, writing "I am 100% ANTIFA all the way!" in an Instagram post in June, said in an Associated Press video interview earlier in the summer that he had provided security for other protesters. In a Vice News interview after the shooting and before being killed by the police, Reinohel clarified that "I am 100% anti-fascist. I'm not a member of Antifa. I'm not a member of anything", stating that he "had no choice" and acted in self-defense.

=== Violence by police ===
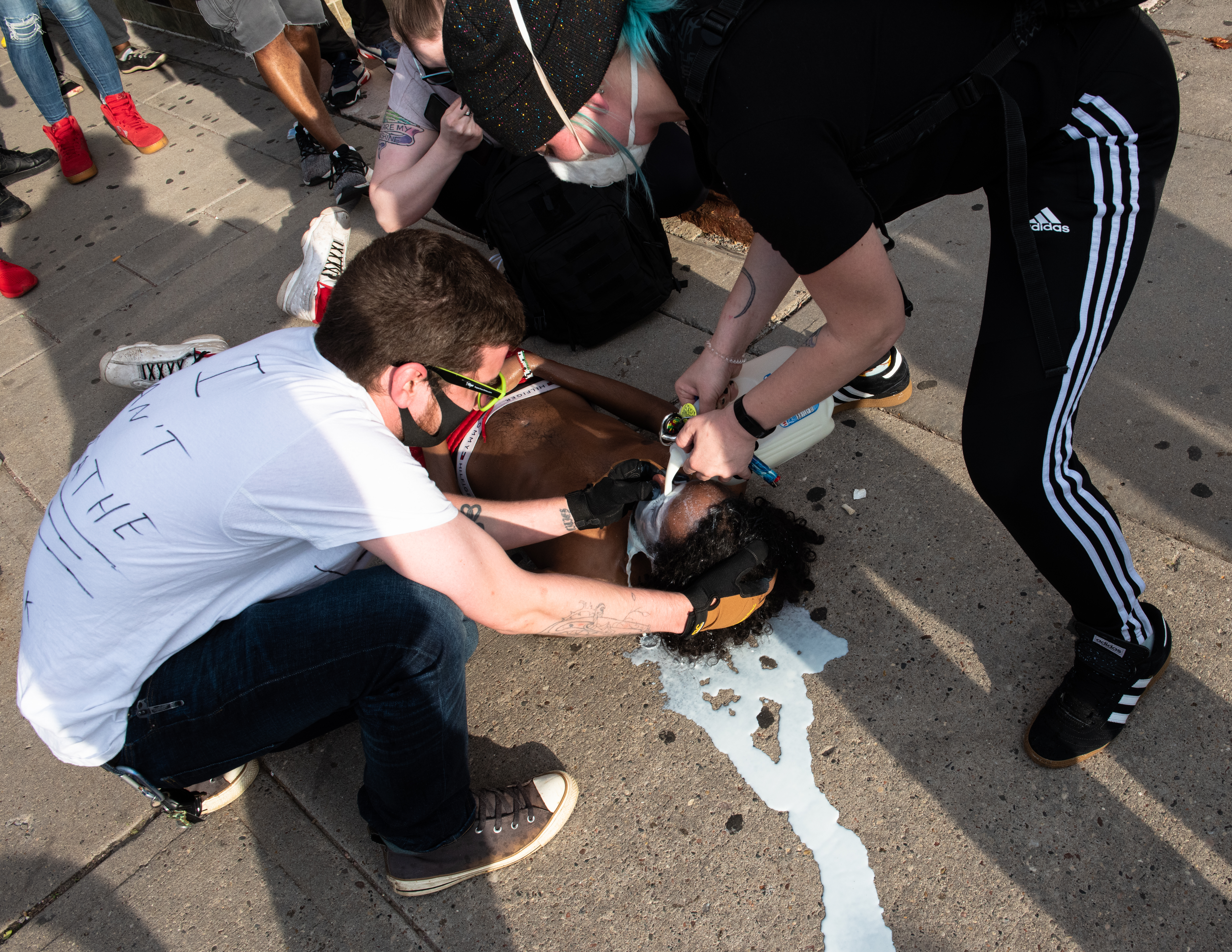
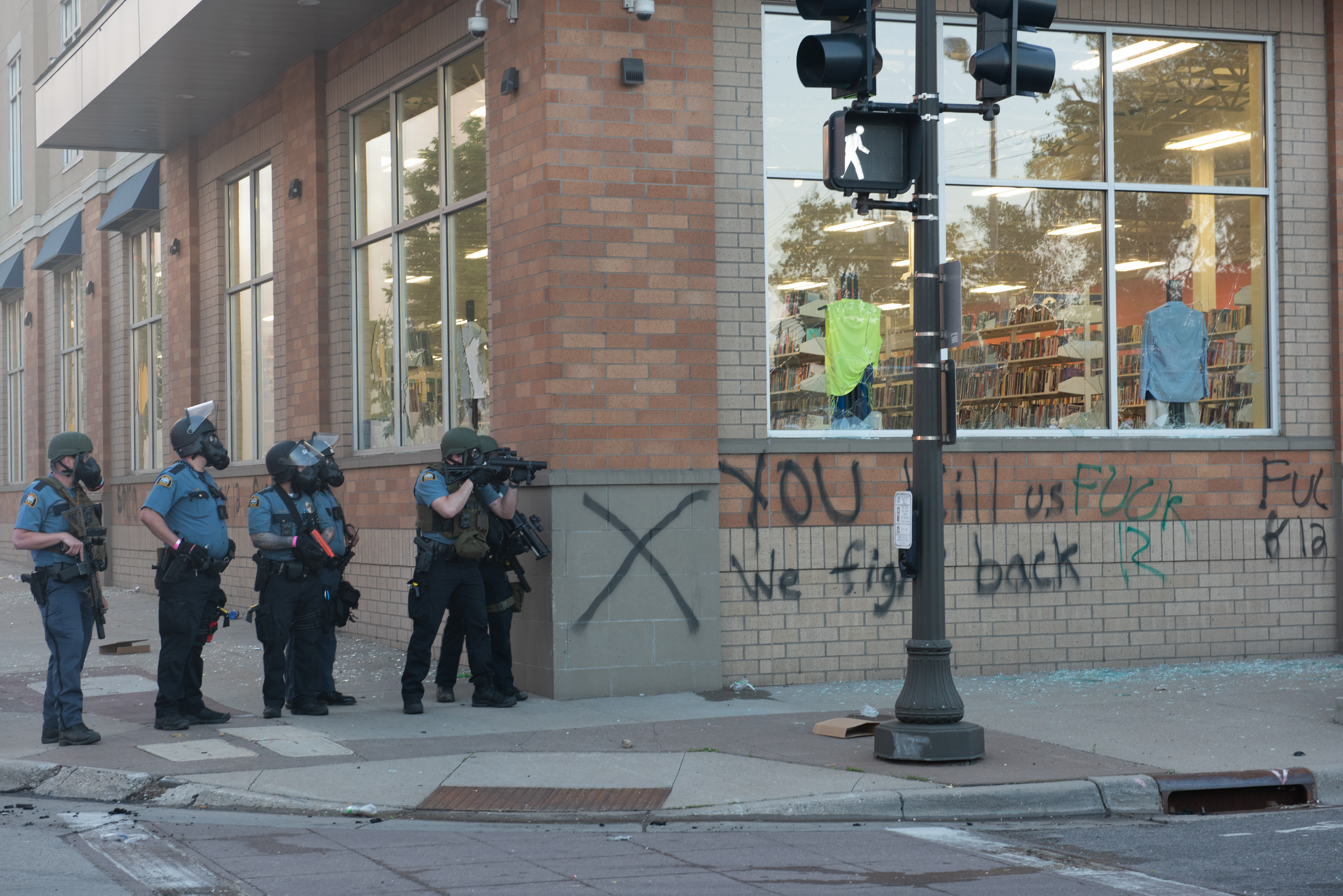
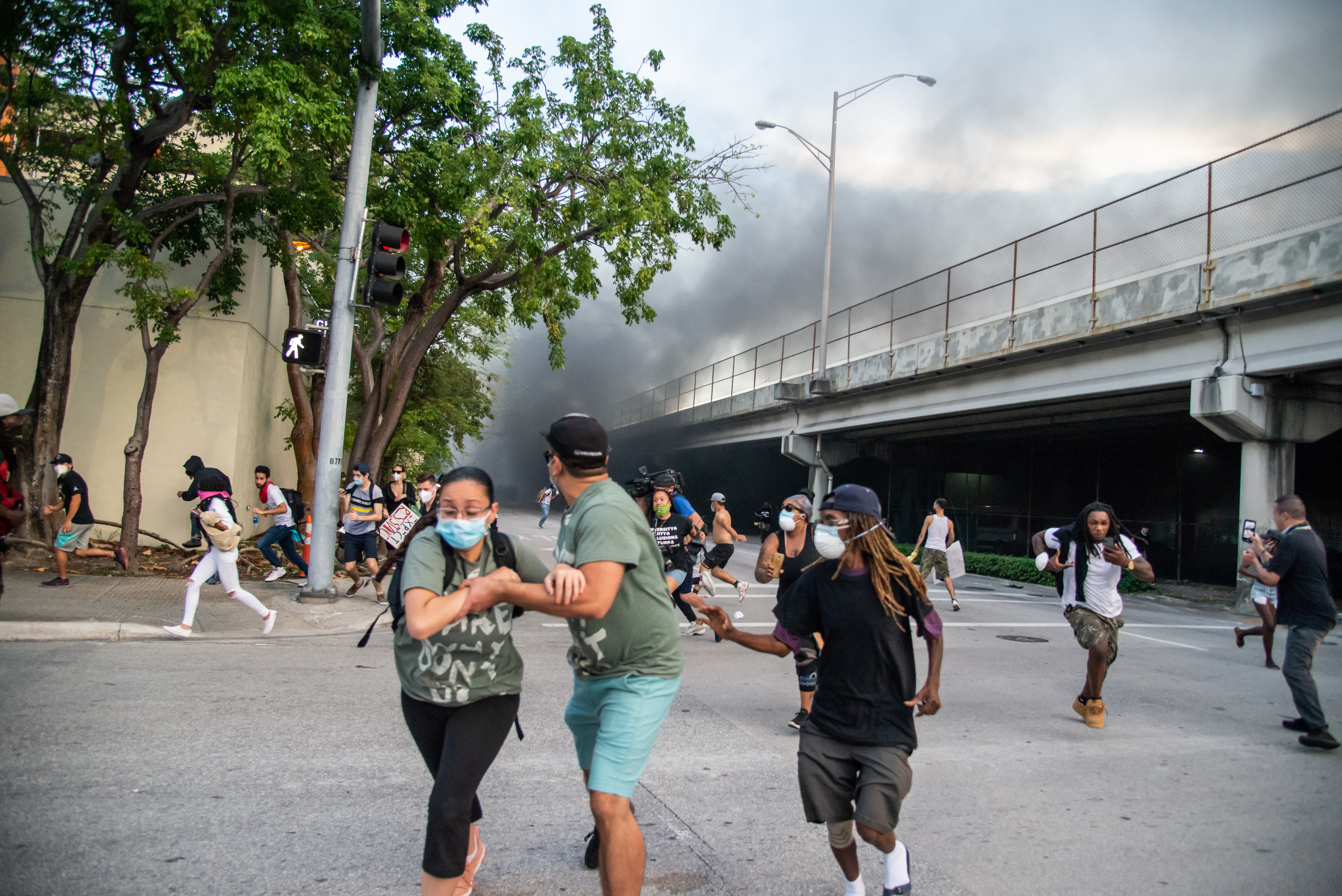
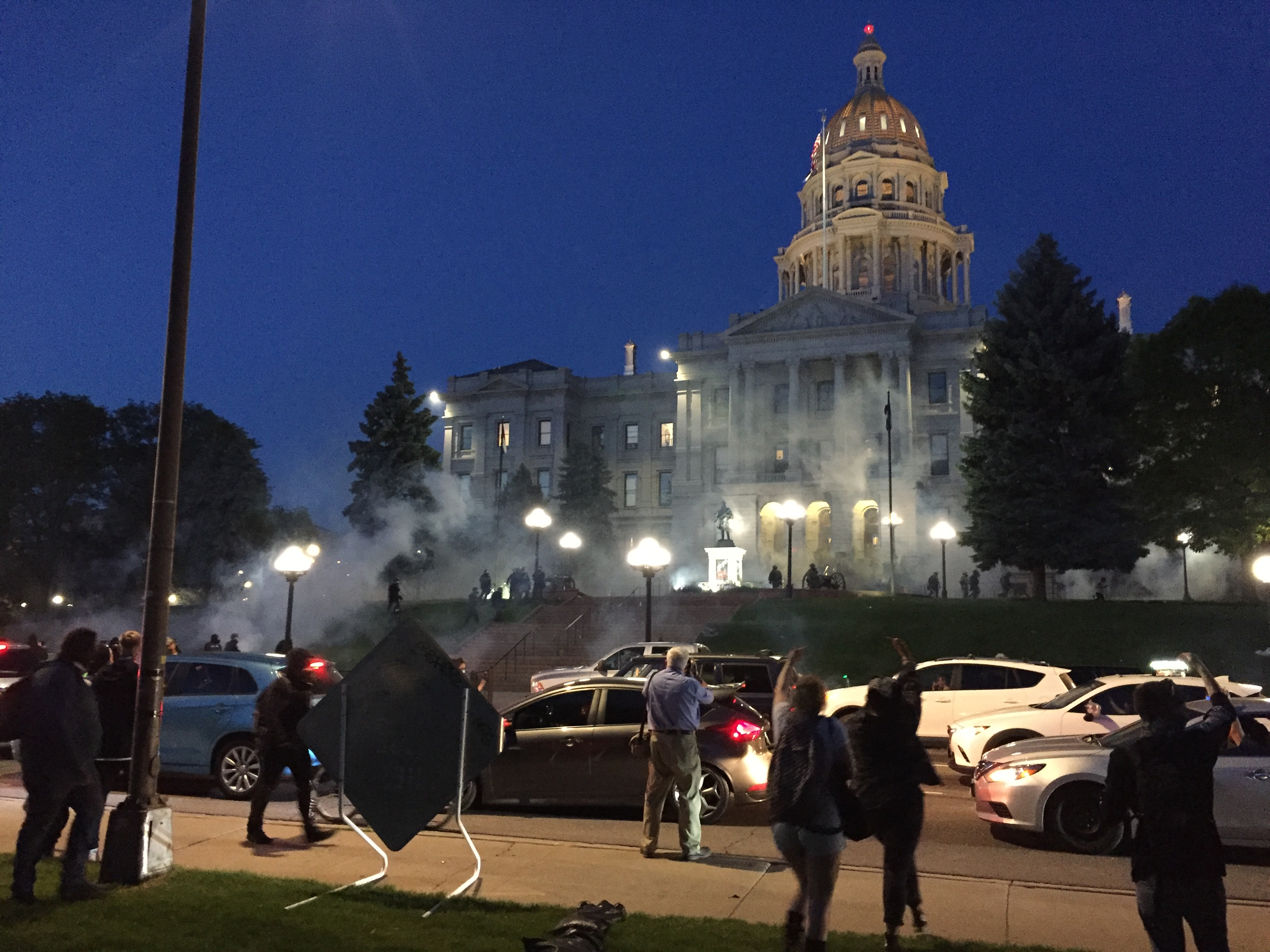
Clockwise from top left: Flushing the eyes of a protester in Minneapolis with milk after exposure to tear gas on May 27; police aim riot control weapons during riots in St. Paul on May 28; tear gas deployed at the Colorado State Capitol on May 29; Miami protesters react to police firing chemical irritants on May 30

There have been numerous reports and videos of aggressive police actions using physical force including "batons, tear gas, pepper spray and rubber bullets on protesters, bystanders and journalists, often without warning or seemingly unprovoked." These incidents have provoked "growing concern that aggressive law enforcement tactics intended to impose order were instead inflaming tensions." The police responded that such tactics are necessary to prevent vandalism and arson, and that police officers themselves have been assaulted with thrown rocks and water bottles. Amnesty International issued a press release calling for the police to end excessive militarized responses to the protests. Police have been found "overwhelmingly responsible for attacking journalists."

Several African American politicians, including State Senator Zellnor Myrie, U.S. Rep. Joyce Beatty, Columbus City Council President Shannon Hardin and Franklin County Commissioner Kevin Boyce were reportedly pepper sprayed by police. Chicago Police Board President Ghian Foreman was reportedly beaten with batons during a police clash with protesters. A medical worker in Brooklyn, New York claimed to have been assaulted by police for no reason. In Asheville, North Carolina, a medic station was destroyed by police for unknown reasons. A Washington, D.C., man was praised worldwide for sheltering, in his home, more than 70 protesters fleeing arrest for protesting peacefully in front of the White House on June 1, 2020.

Lawyer T. Greg Doucette and mathematician Jason Miller have compiled a list of videos posted on Twitter showing police brutality, which as of June 6 contains 428 videos.

==== May 30 ====
External videos
- Two NYPD vehicles driving into a crowd of protesters, @pgarapon on Twitter
- Grand Rapids police pepper spraying a protester and then firing a tear gas canister at their head on YouTube

On May 30, multiple incidents of police violence occurred during protests.

Two New York City Police Department (NYPD) vehicles were recorded ramming into protesters surrounding and throwing objects at the vehicles; New York City mayor Bill de Blasio defended the officers' actions and an investigation into the event was initiated.

In Atlanta, two police officers broke the windows of a vehicle, pulled a woman out of the car and tasered a man. After a video showing the incident came to light, the two police officers were fired for use of excessive force. Arrest warrants were issued for four other officers involved. One of the officers said in a police report that the actions were taken under the belief that either of the pair were armed, a statement that an attorney for one of the victims called an attempt at character assassination. One of the victims described the event as "the worst experience of my life"; the other wore a cast on his arm at a press conference. On June 3, six Atlanta police officers, including the two officers in the window-breaking and dragging incident, were charged for using excessive force during an arrest.

A woman participating in a protest in La Mesa, California was shot by the police with bean-bag round between her eyes, suffering serious injury. At a protest in Grand Rapids, Michigan, a viral video showed Grand Rapids Police pepper spraying a protester and then immediately firing a tear gas canister into their head. The Grand Rapids Police Department announced on June 2 that they would conduct an internal investigation of the incident.

In Seattle, an officer placed his knee on the back of the neck of a looting suspect; after onlookers shouted for him to remove his knee from the man's neck his partner pulled it off. The Seattle Office of Police Accountability received about 12,000 individual complaints regarding the police department's conduct during that weekend, including complaints about "[p]epper spraying a young girl," "[p]unching a person on the ground who was being arrested," "[p]lacing a knee on the neck area of two people who had been arrested," "[f]ailing to record law enforcement activity on body-worn video," and "[breaking] windows of a Target store."

==== May 31 ====
On May 31, 20-year-old African American Texas State University student Justin Howell was shot in the head with a less lethal bean bag round by an APD officer while protesting outside police headquarters in Austin, Texas. Chief of Police Brian Manley said they were aiming at another protester and shot Howell by mistake. Fellow protesters were instructed by police to carry the injured Howell toward them for medical aid, however, those protesters were then also fired upon by police. Howell was left in critical condition, with a fractured skull and brain damage.

In Minneapolis, police cruisers were filmed spraying a chemical on crowds of protesters as they drove by.

==== June ====
Authorities in Washington, D.C., dispersing protesters with tear gas ahead of President Donald Trump's visit to St. John's Episcopal Church on June 1 (audio in Spanish)

On June 1, President Donald Trump visited the historic St. John's Episcopal Church, whose basement had been damaged by fire during the protests the previous night, and posed for pictures in front of it holding up a Bible. To clear the route so that he could walk there, police and national guardsmen had used tear gas, rubber bullets, and flash grenades to clear a crowd of peaceful protesters from Lafayette Square, resulting in significant news coverage and denunciation by the bishop of the Episcopal Diocese of Washington. In a press release the next day, United States Park Police said they had observed protesters throwing bricks and other dangerous projectiles, but journalists present claimed the protests were peaceful before police moved in.

On June 4, police shot tear gas at an unarmed couple waiting at a traffic stop in Denver. When the man came out of the vehicle to confront the officers because his pregnant wife was in the vehicle, the officers ordered him to move along. He refused and the officers opened fire on him and the vehicle with pepper balls.

===== Shoving incident (June 4–5) =====
In Buffalo, a 75-year-old man with a cane was left bleeding from the head after approaching police officers and being shoved by police, causing him to fall to the ground. A video of the encounter shows an officer leaning down to examine him, but another officer then pulls the first officer away. Several other officers are seen walking by the man, motionless on the ground, without checking on him. Initially, a police press statement claimed that the man "tripped and fell" which led to further criticism. The victim, identified as Martin Gugino, remained in a serious condition by the end of the day. Two of the officers were suspended, as they yelled "move!" and "push him back!" against the victim, before they hit him.

On June 5, all 57 officers of the Buffalo Police Department resigned from the department's Emergency Response Team, either in solidarity with the two officers who were suspended for this event, or because the union was no longer willing to provide legal support for the officers. The two officers involved were charged with second-degree assault.

=== Violence by protesters ===
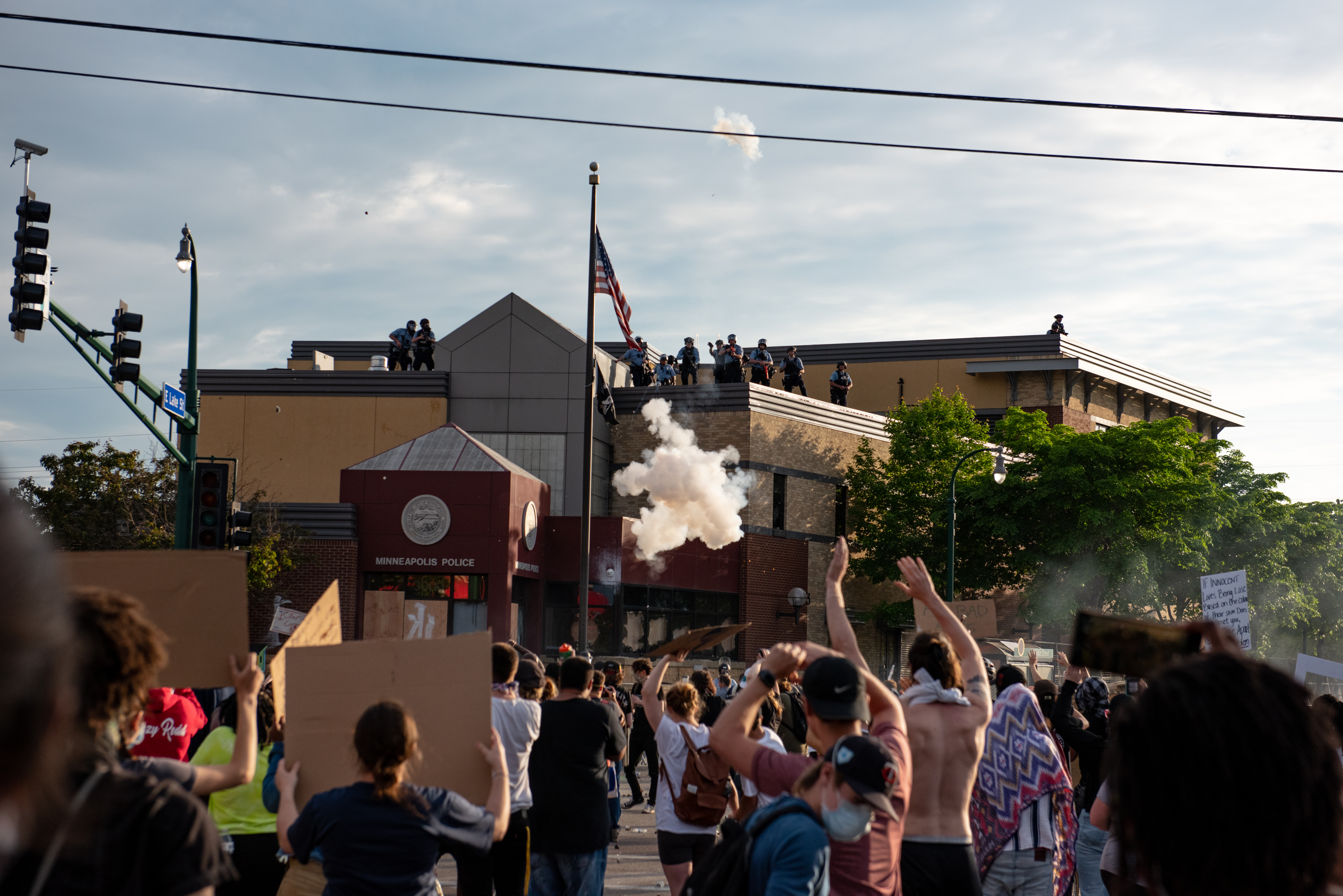
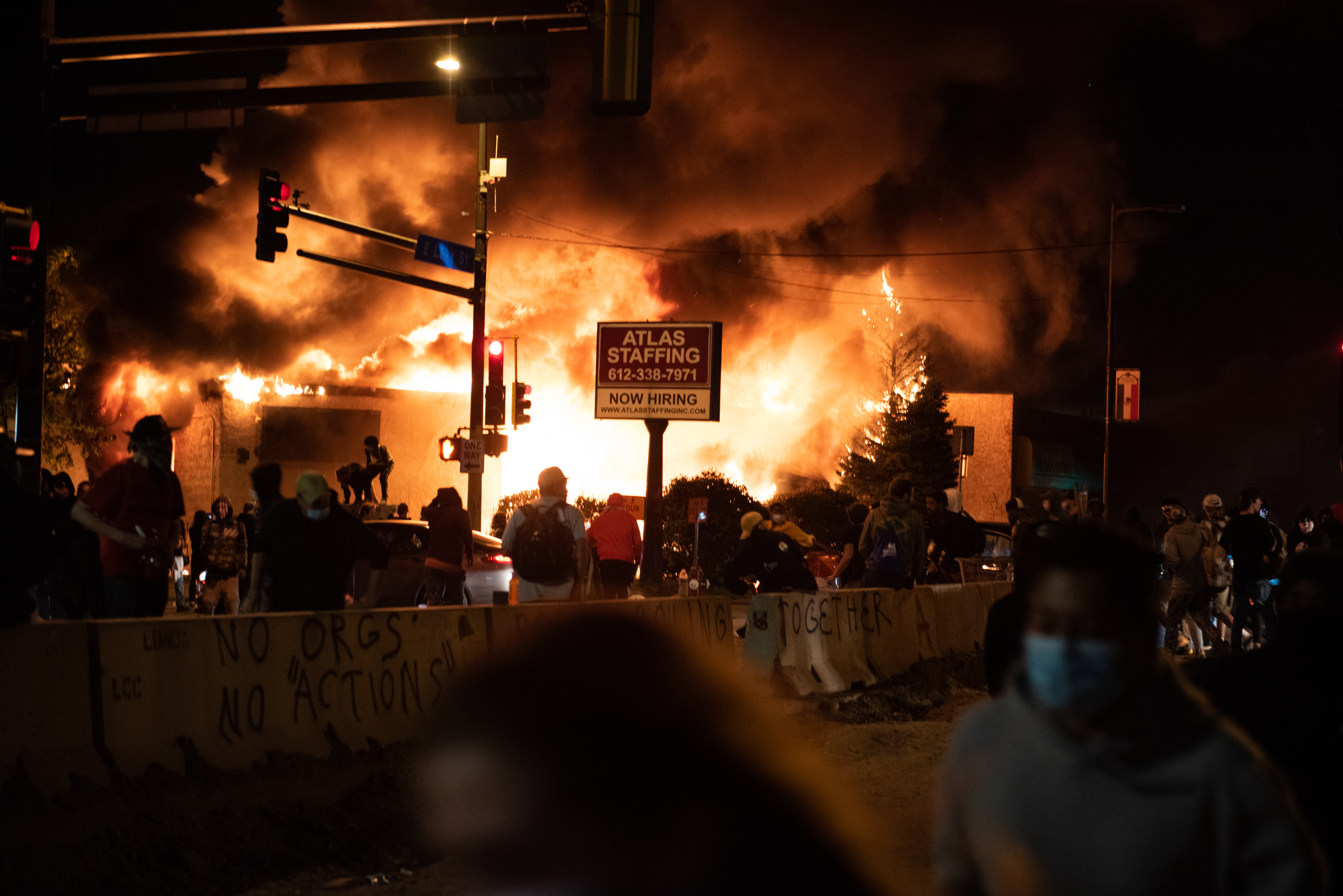
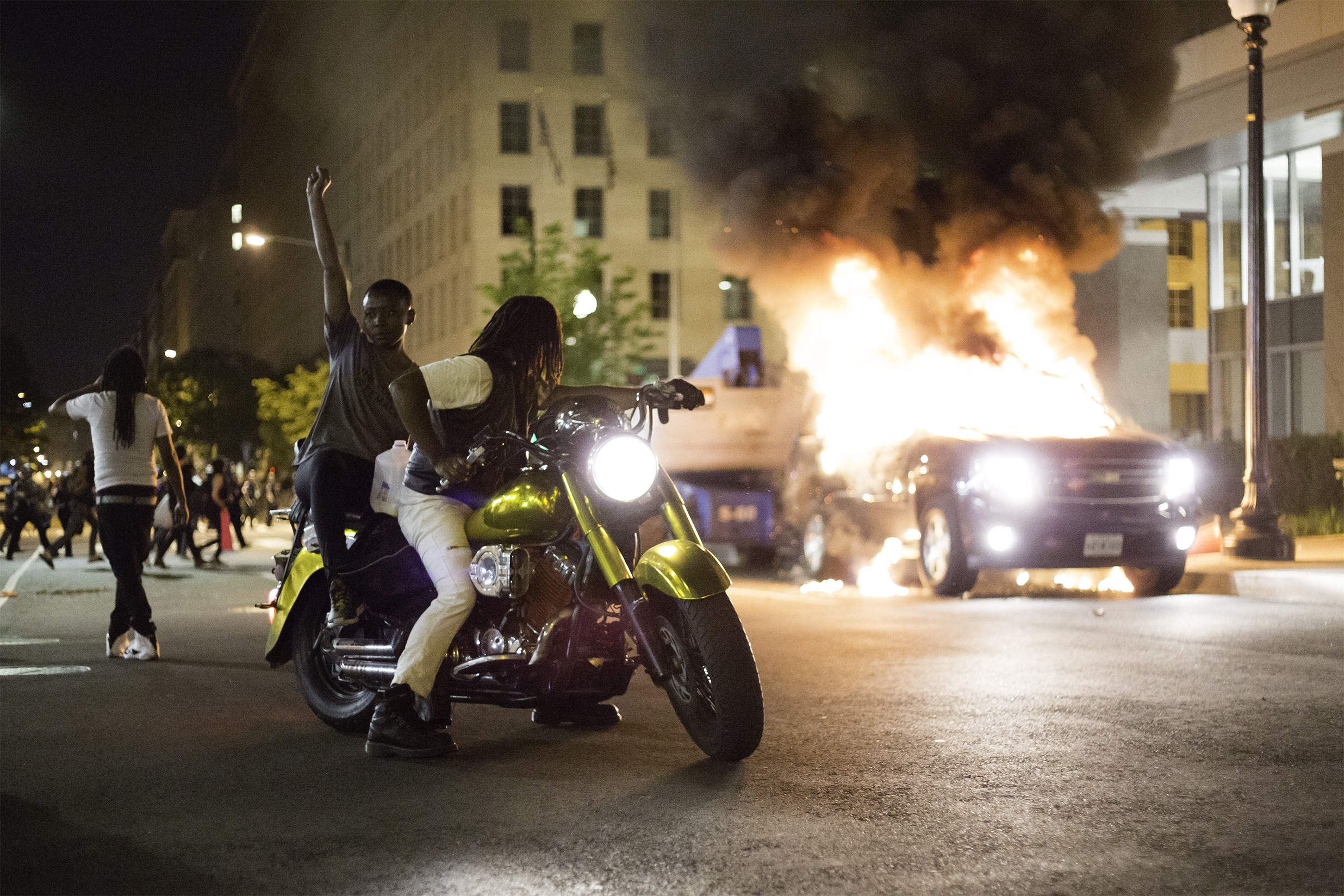
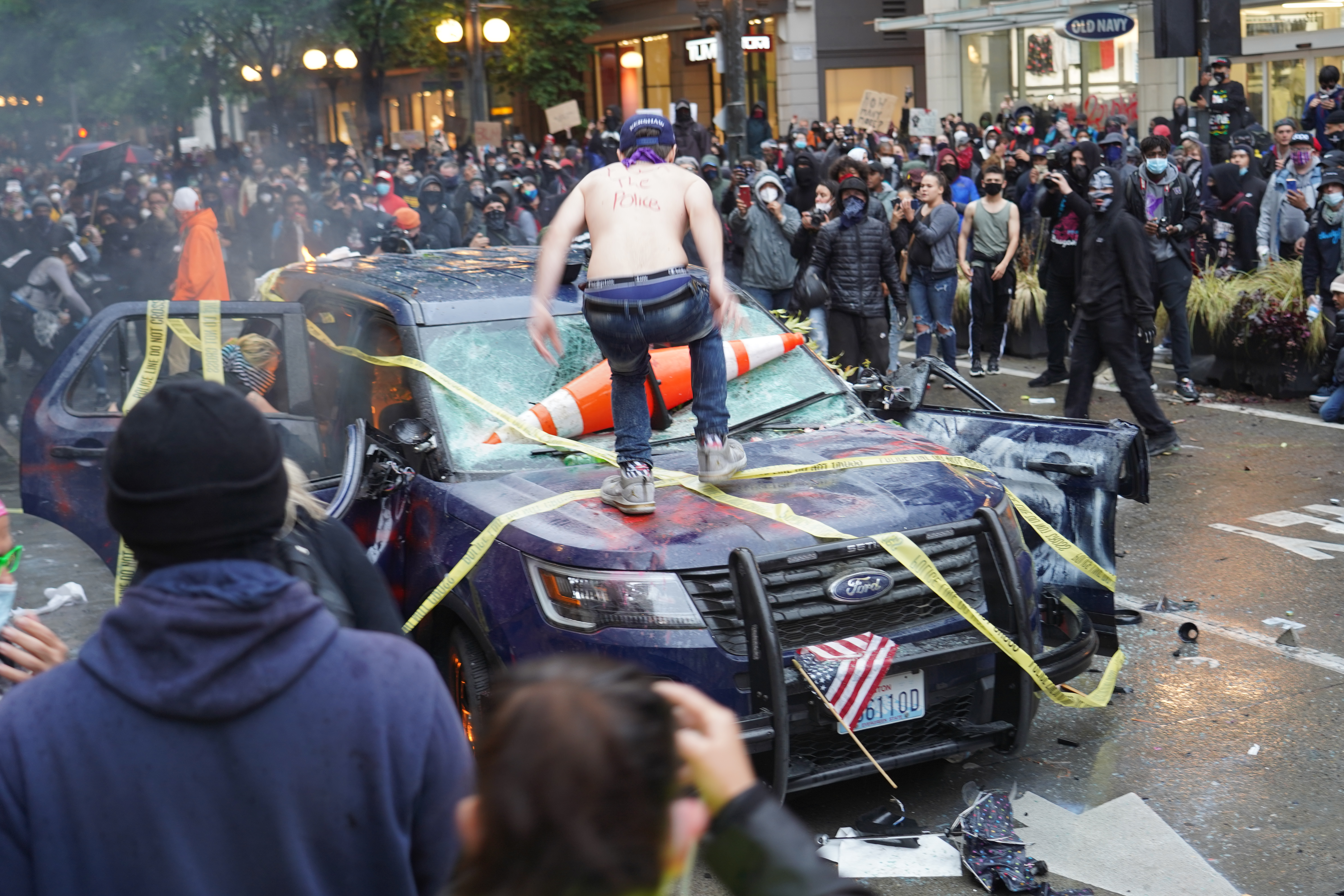
Clockwise from top left: Police deploy munitions as protesters surround the third precinct station in Minneapolis on May 27; multiple buildings burn during riots in Minneapolis on May 29; a rioter jumps on the hood of a burning police vehicle in Seattle on May 30; a police vehicle burns in Washington, D.C., on May 30

On the night of May 30, a video was posted online showing a man being assaulted by protesters in Dallas. According to Fox Business, the man appeared to defend a store, reportedly armed with a machete, and skirmished with rioters throwing rocks at him. The man was injured, but taken to the hospital and considered to be in a stable condition. Trump called the act of violence "terrible" and demanded arrests and "long term jail sentences" for protesters. The protesters claimed they acted in self-defense, and that the video was edited to give a "false impression". According to BlackSportsOnline.com, Charles C.A. Shoultz later claimed to be the man who was attacked by these protesters, saying he instigated the fight, explaining he was "trying to protect the bar he likes". Dallas Police said the incident was part of an ongoing investigation.

On July 25, an individual drove through a group of protesters blocking I-225 in Aurora, Colorado to demand action against the death of Elijah McClain. One individual fired a weapon in response, and at least one protester was struck, but was in stable condition. At least two other individuals were injured during the incident. Police have said the vehicle was soon towed and that they are looking into what happened.

On July 25, a man was stabbed in downtown Portland, near the scene of recurring protests outside Portland's federal courthouse. The suspect was taken into custody on the same day. According to The Oregonian, the victim was a vocal black supporter of Trump who was videographing the protests and had been trailed by a group of people.

=== Violence against journalists ===
U.S. Press Freedom Tracker recorded at least 49 arrests, 192 assaults (160 by police), and 42 incidents in which equipment was damaged during the protests. In comparison, the U.S. Press Freedom Tracker documented between 100 and 150 such incidents per year for the past three years. Many journalists described being intentionally targeted by police even after they identified themselves as press. One journalism professor suggested that the unusual aggressiveness toward journalists might relate to Trump's repeated public attacks on the press as "enemies of the people"; in a May 31 tweet, Trump blamed the "lamestream media" for the protests and said that journalists are "truly bad people with a sick agenda."

==== Violence from police ====
External videos
- CNN reporter Omar Jimenez and his filming crew arrested by police during a live television report, CNN
- Officer fires pepper bullets at WAVE reporter in Louisville, MSNBC
- Australian 7News reporter attacked by police on live television in Washington DC, 7 News

Journalists at several protests were injured and arrested by police while trying to cover the story, being shot by rubber bullets, or sprayed by tear gas. As of May 31, Bellingcat had identified and documented at least 50 separate incidents where journalists were attacked by law enforcement officials during the protests. According to Bellingcat, "law enforcement across multiple cities, but especially in Minneapolis, are knowingly and deliberately targeting journalists with less lethal munitions, arrests and other forms of violence."

===== May 28 =====
On the evening of May 28, officers fired pepper bullets at several employees of The Denver Post who were reporting on protests in Denver, Colorado. A photographer was struck twice by pepper bullets, sustaining injuries on his arm. The photographer believed it was not accidental, saying, "If it was one shot, I can say it was an accident. I'm very sure it was the same guy twice. I'm very sure he pointed at me." Another journalist said an officer shot at least one pepper bullet at her feet.

===== May 29 =====
Omar Jimenez, a CNN reporter, and his news crew were arrested while giving a live television report on May 29 in Minneapolis by the Minnesota State Patrol, and then released about an hour later. After the incident took place, Minnesota Governor Tim Walz said that he deeply apologizes for what happened and would work to have the crew released, calling the event "unacceptable" and adding that there was "absolutely no reason something like this should happen."

CNN called the arrests a "clear violation of their First Amendment rights" in a tweet posted the same day. After the incident the Minnesota State Patrol tweeted that "In the course of clearing the streets and restoring order at Lake Street and Snelling Avenue, four people were arrested by State Patrol troopers, including three members of a CNN crew. The three were released once they were confirmed to be members of the media," however the CNN crew had already informed the troopers that they were members of the media before and during the arrest and carried the relevant paperwork and identification with them. The Minneapolis Police Department falsely stated both while performing the arrest and via Twitter that his crew had not adequately responded when asked what they were doing.

Linda Tirado, a freelance photo journalist, was hit in the eye with a rubber bullet or a pellet by the police in Minneapolis, and following surgery was left permanently blind in that eye.

Also on May 29 in Louisville, Kentucky, an officer fired pepper bullets at a reporter from NBC affiliate WAVE who was reporting live on air for her station. The station manager issued a statement strongly condemning the incident, saying there was "no justification for police to wantonly open fire." A 29-year-old mother of two was peacefully protesting in Sacramento when police shot her in the right eye with a rubber projectile; she was permanently blinded in one eye.

===== May 30 =====
On May 30, members of a Reuters crew were fired on with rubber bullets in Minneapolis shortly after a curfew they were reporting on began. One reporter was hit in the arm and neck while another was hit in the face, which deflected off his gas mask. Also in Minneapolis, France 2's U.S. correspondent Agnès Varamian said her photojournalist, Fabien Fougère, was hurt by non-lethal bullets as she shouted "press" to the police. Expressen's U.S. correspondent Nina Svanberg was also hit in the leg with rubber bullets. Meanwhile Deutsche Welle journalist Stefan Simons and his team were shot at by police in Minneapolis. In another incident that day, police also threatened to arrest Simons.

===== May 31 =====
Adolfo Guzman-Lopez, a reporter for Los Angeles NPR/PRI affiliate KPCC was hit in the throat with a rubber bullet, on May 31. Ali Velshi and his MSNBC crew were hit with rubber bullets live on air in Minneapolis. CBC News correspondent Susan Ormiston was also hit by rubber bullets during live coverage there. Michael George from the same network also reported his sound engineer being hit by a rubber bullet in the same city. Sarah Belle, an independent journalist, was hit by a rubber bullet in Oakland.

Los Angeles Times reporter Molly Hennessy-Fiske reported reporters and camera crews being at the receiving end of tear gas by Minnesota State Patrol, while the same happened to a KABC-TV news crew in Santa Monica. Several Detroit Free Press journalists were pepper sprayed by the city's police, as was KSTP reporter Ryan Raiche along other journalists. Michael Adams from Vice News also reported that happening to him and other journalists present. HuffPost journalist Christopher Mathias was arrested in Brooklyn, as were independent journalist Simon Moya-Smith in Minneapolis, and CNN's Keith Boykin in New York.

A BBC cameraman, Peter Murtaugh, was purposely attacked by police on May 31 outside the White House. Murtaugh filmed a line of police officers charging without warning, whereby a shield-wielding officer tackled Murtaugh to the ground. A fellow BBC journalist stated that the attack had occurred before a curfew was imposed.

In Minneapolis, for the second day in a row, police shot at Deutsche Welle journalist Stefan Simons and his crew.

===== June =====
During a live television broadcast for the Seven Network covering protests near the White House on June 1, Australian journalist Amelia Brace and cameraman Tim Myers were assaulted by a charging United States Park Police line as the area was cleared for Trump to visit St. John's Church. Brace was clubbed with a police baton while Myers was hit in the chest by a riot shield and then punched. Brace said she and Myers were also shot by rubber bullets. Brace said at the time, "You heard us yelling there that we were media but they don't care, they are being indiscriminate at the moment." In response, the Australian Prime Minister Scott Morrison announced Australia would launch an investigation into the incident. White House Press Secretary Kayleigh McEnany defended the actions of the police and said they had "a right to defend themselves." Park Police acting Chief Gregory Monahan announced that two officers involved had been assigned to administrative duties while an investigation took place.

On June 2, the Manhattan District Attorney's Office announced that they would be investigating the alleged assault of a Wall Street Journal reporter, that took place on May 31, by members of the New York Police Department.

==== From protesters ====
In Atlanta on May 29, 2020 the CNN Center which also houses a police precinct of the Atlanta Police Department was attacked and damaged by protesters.

In the District of Columbia on May 30, 2020, a Fox News crew was attacked outside the White House by a group of protesters while reporting on the scene. The crew was chased for several hundred meters until the police intervened.

A news reporter was struck in the head with a bottle during overnight riots in Birmingham, Alabama on May 31, 2020.

=== Criminal activity ===
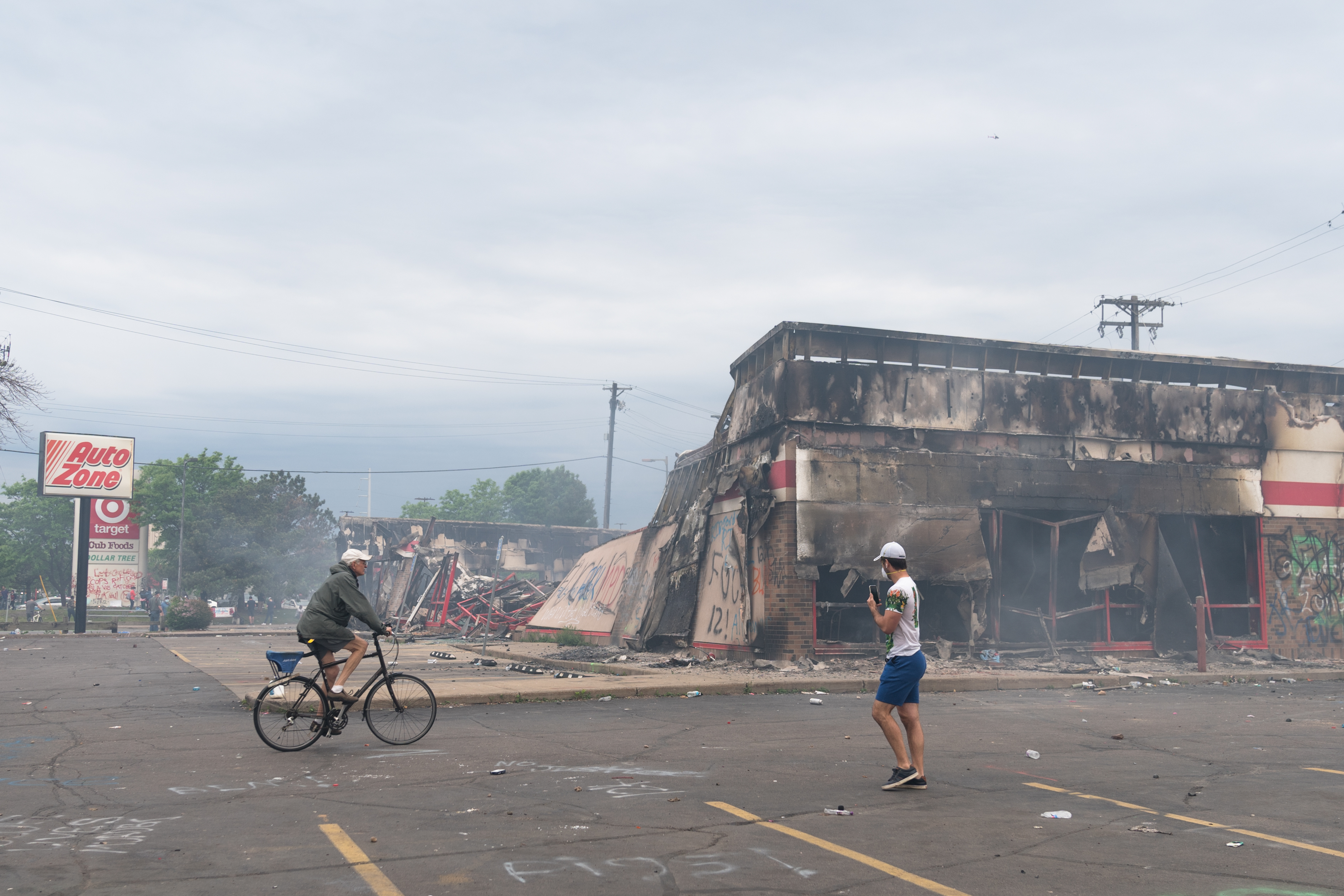
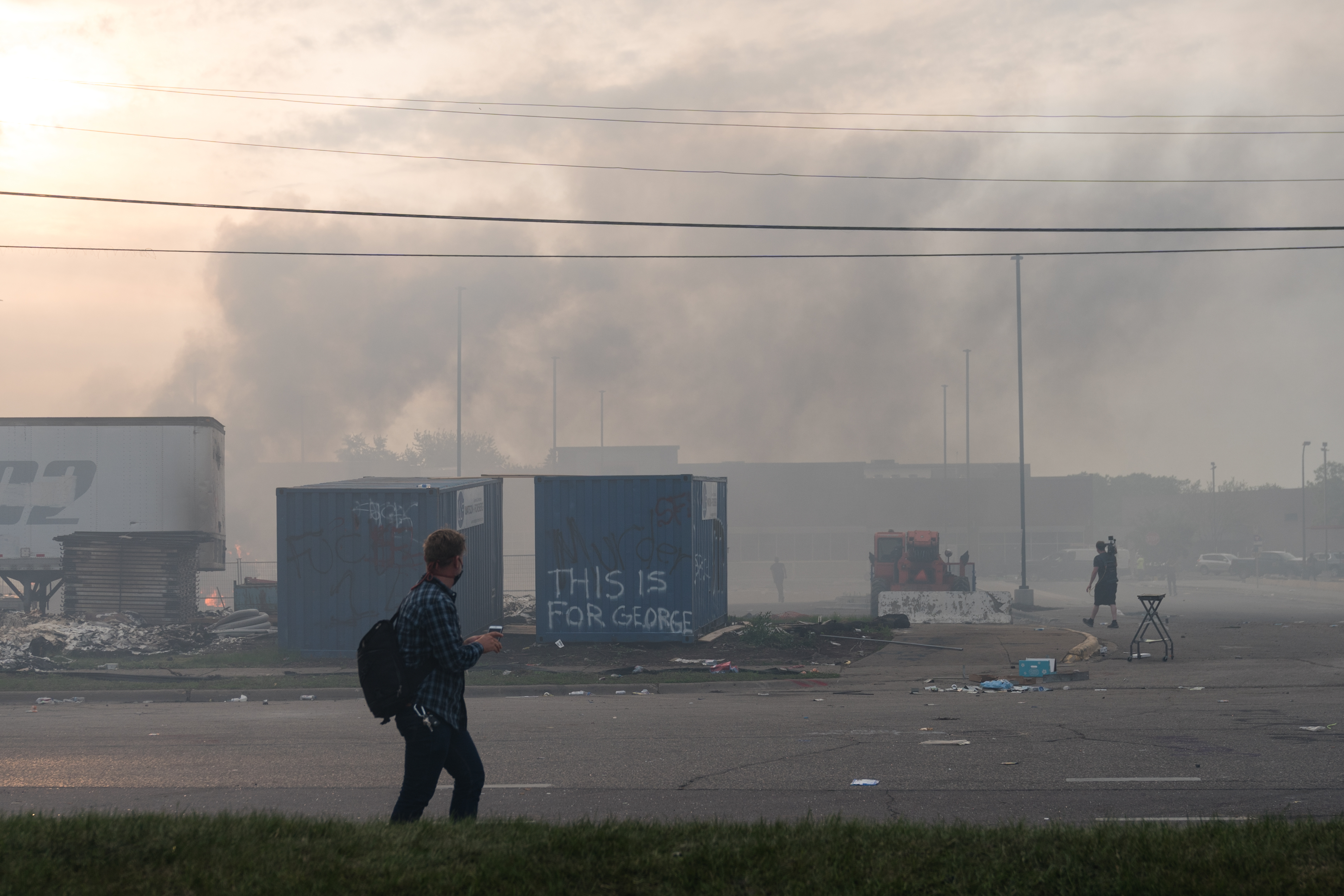
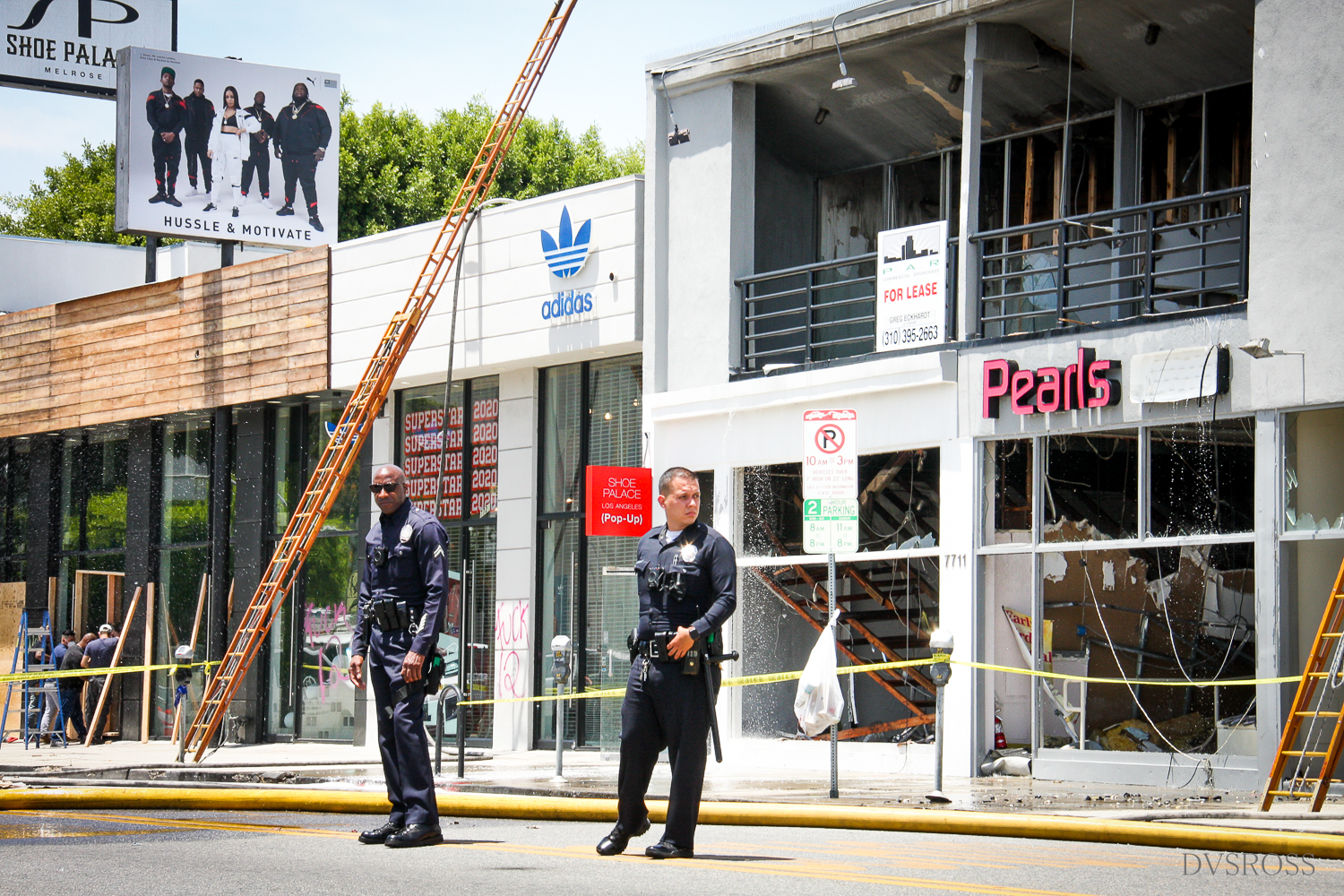
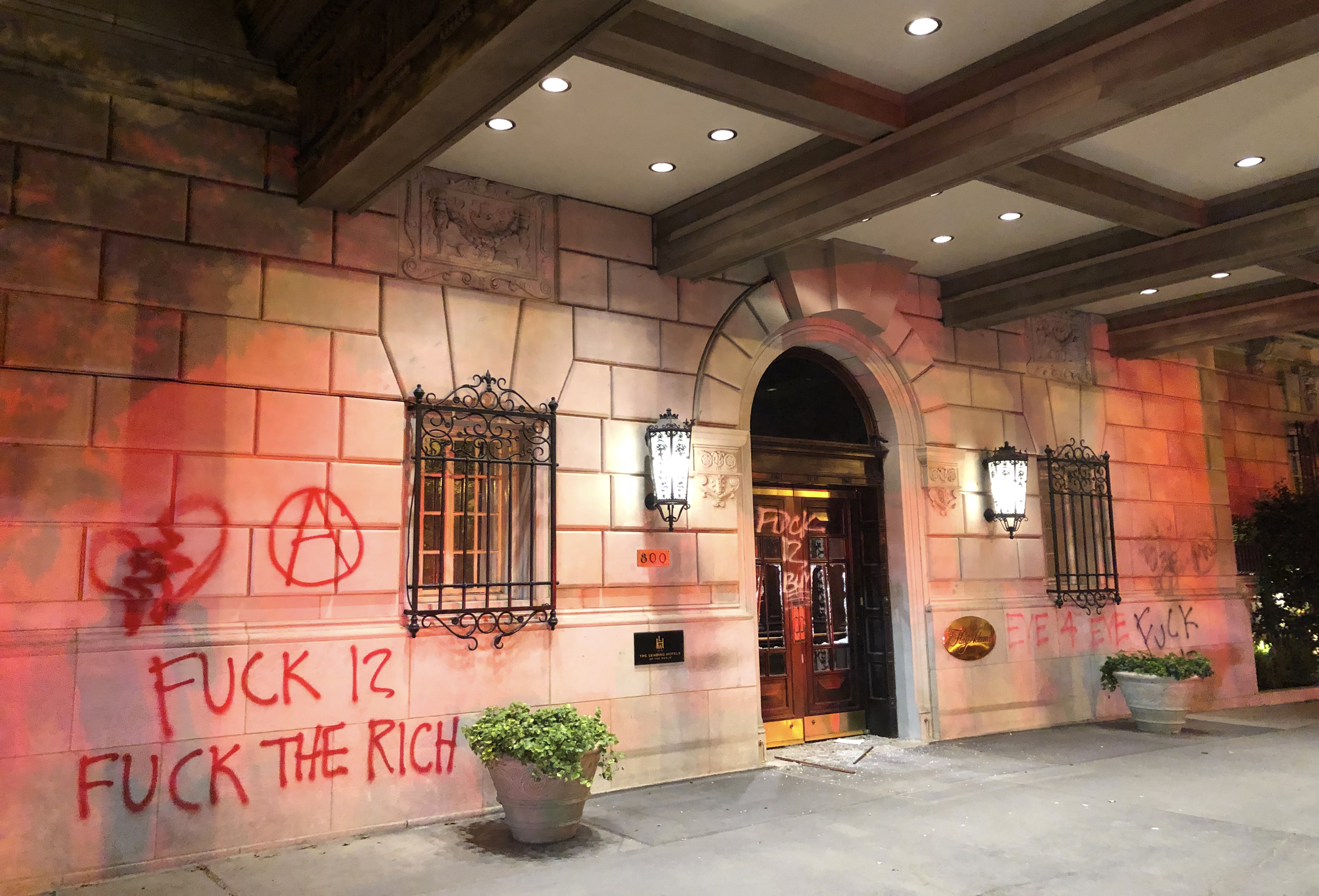
Clockwise from top left: A burned-down AutoZone in Minneapolis on May 28; smoke from burning businesses near East Lake Street in Minneapolis on May 28; a vandalized hotel in Washington, D.C., on May 30; damaged stores on Melrose Avenue in Los Angeles on May 31

==== Estimated financial costs ====
The director of Minneapolis's Lake Street Council estimated that damage to the city's small businesses not covered by insurance was estimated around $200 million. An estimate by the company Property Claim Services, obtained by the news website Axios, estimated that nationwide, the cost of property damage from arson, vandalism and looting would "result in at least $1 billion to $2 billion of paid insurance claims."

==== Arson ====
The FBI and ATF investigated 164 structure fires from arson that occurred May 27–30, 2020, during the George Floyd protests in Minneapolis–Saint Paul. Some fires spread to adjacent structures or damaged multi-use buildings. Most of properties affected by arson were commercial businesses. Arson fires also damaged a variety of buildings containing schools, non-profit organizations, government services, and private residences. In the weeks and months after the rioting, authorities had difficulty identifying those responsible for destruction. By May 2021, a year after the unrest, federal investigators had only filed arson charges against 17 people for damages at 11 properties in the Minneapolis–Saint Paul metropolitan region. Only one federal charging document noted any ties to an extremist organization—the Boogaloo movement.

==== May 29 ====
In Oakland, California on May 29, two Federal Protective Service officers were shot while patrolling the Ronald V. Dellums Federal Building as protests occurred several blocks away. Officer David Patrick Underwood died from the gunfire. Steven Carrillo, an active-duty U.S. Air Force sergeant, was charged with Underwood's murder, as well shooting two Santa Cruz County deputies on June 6, killing Sgt. Damon Gutzwiller. Carillo and his accomplice, Robert A. Justus Jr., both have ties to the far-right boogaloo movement. The FBI stated, "Carrillo elected to travel to Oakland to conduct this murder and take advantage of a time when this nation was mourning the death of George Floyd. There is no evidence that these men had any intention to join the demonstration in Oakland. They came to Oakland to kill cops."

==== May 30 ====
In Philadelphia, a bike officer was run over by a group of looters in a car. He suffered broken bones and is recovering in Jefferson Hospital.

In Atlanta, around 10:30 p.m., APD officer Maximilian Brewer was struck by an ATV. He was taken to the intensive care unit at Grady Hospital. The driver was identified as 42-year-old Avery Goggans. Three Denver, CO police officers were hospitalized after being struck by a vehicle during late night protests on May 30. Driver Anthony Knapp was taken into custody in relation to the incident.

==== May 31 ====
In Tulsa, Oklahoma protesters were demonstrating on I-244 while blocking traffic. In videos posted to social media, a red truck pulling a horse trailer can be seen attempting to continue along the interstate but being stopped by the protesters while the car ahead of it was allowed through. The truck attempted to follow the other vehicle causing some protesters to attempt to stop the truck and others attempted to disperse the crowd in front of it. Some protesters were injured when the truck drove through the crowd, and one protester was paralyzed after being pushed off the interstate during the chaos.

In Minneapolis, a Minnesota National Guard soldier fired 3 rounds at a speeding vehicle that attempted to run over police officers and soldiers.

==== June ====
In Buffalo, New York, a car rammed a police line near where protesters had gathered on June 1. Two officers were seriously injured and subsequently hospitalized, with three people being arrested. 30-year-old Deyanna Davis was arrested. In St. Louis, a Missouri State Trooper responding to a riot was struck by a bullet that lodged in his helmet's face-shield. The Missouri State Highway Patrol (MSHP) shared images of a bullet hole in the shield Tuesday, saying the trooper “narrowly averted serious injury.”

In Las Vegas, Nevada, police officer Shay Mikalonis was hospitalized in critical condition after being shot by Edgar Samaniego, while Mikalonis and other officers were arresting protesters near Circus Circus Hotel and Casino.

In New York City, in the early hours of June 2, two NYPD officers were struck in two separate hit-and-run incidents while responding to looting.

In Albuquerque, New Mexico on June 15, Steven Ray Baca shot one of a group of protesters attempting to remove a statue of Juan de Oñate at the Albuquerque Museum of Art and History. Video shows protesters attempting to pull down the statue with a chain or rope and a pickaxe and Baca shoving a female protester to the ground while trying to protect the memorial. Baca was then aggressively pursued by enraged protesters before being tackled. Protester Scott Williams struck Baca with a long board before Baca fired several shots with at least one striking Williams in the torso.

=== Deployment of federal forces ===
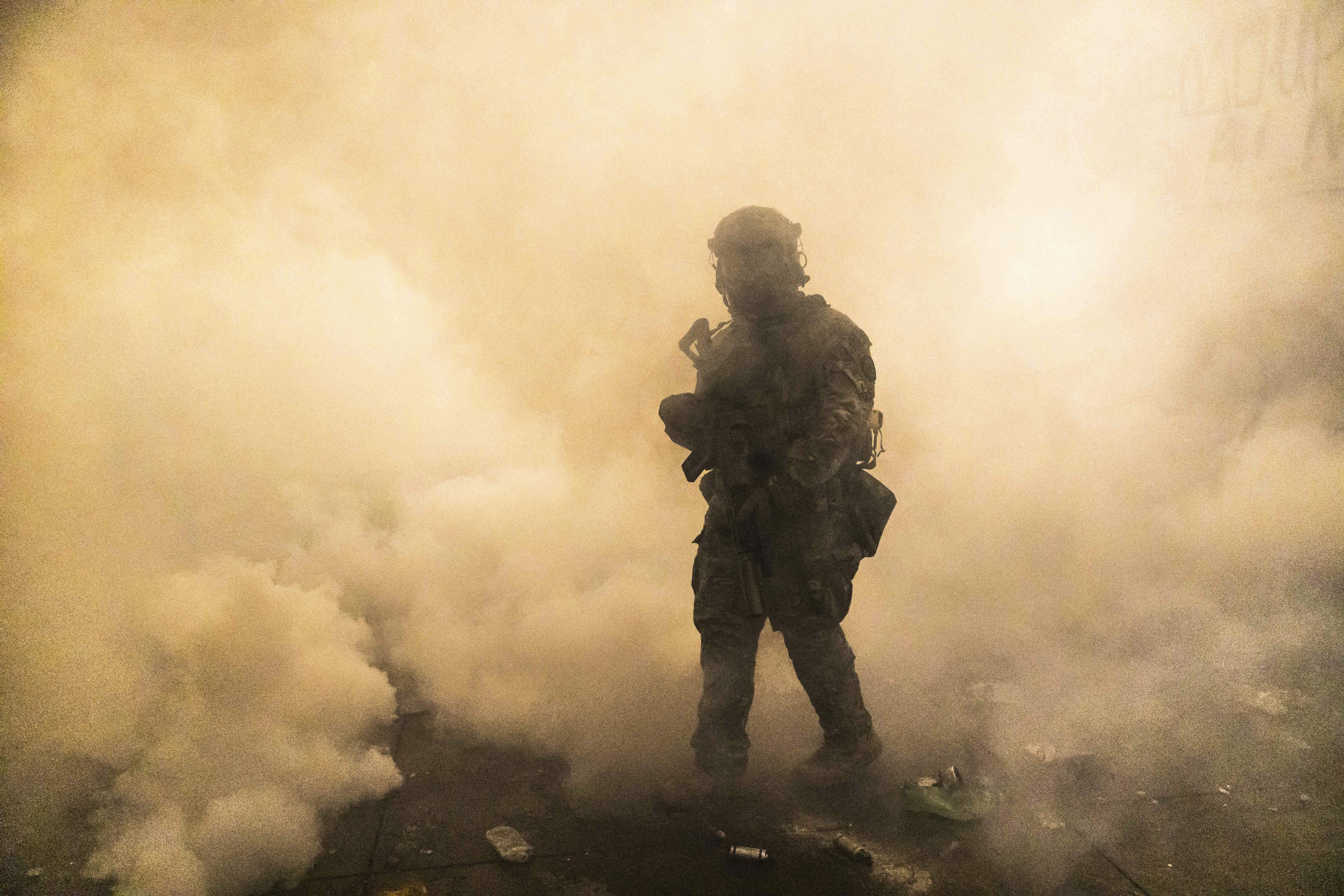
A U.S. Customs and Border Protection agent in a cloud of tear gas during violent protests in Portland, Oregon, July 25, 2020

In response to rioting, looting, and the targeting of federal buildings and public monuments by protesters during the height of the unrest, the Trump administration deployed federal law enforcement details to select cities with the stated purpose of protecting "monuments, memorials and statues" and federal property. The deployments drew controversy and outrage when protesters in Portland, Oregon began to be detained by unidentified federal agents in unmarked vehicles, often not on or near federal property; the federal agent activity briefly increased the size of the protests.

In September 2020, the Trump administration began efforts to revoke federal funding to Portland, Oregon, Seattle, New York City, Washington, D.C. and other cities deemed by Trump as "anarchist jurisdictions", accusing the local governments of allowing themselves to "deteriorate into lawless zones".

=== Firearms ===
The unrest was followed by an unprecedented number of firearms being transferred inside of the United States. Background checks for legally purchased firearms reached record highs in May with year-on-year numbers up 80.2%. In June 2020 the FBI reported running 3.9 million NICS checks for persons purchasing a firearm or firearms. This represented the highest monthly number of firearms transfers since the FBI began keeping records in 1998.

Firearms retailers surveyed by National Shooting Sports Foundation in May estimated that 40% of their sales came from first-time gun buyers, 40% of those first-time gun buyers were women, a relatively high rate for that demographic group. Though gun sales have been up across the country, a rise in first-time gun buyers in left-leaning states like California have helped fuel the national uptick in firearms and ammunition purchases. June 2020 represented the largest month of firearms purchases in United States history, with Illinois purchasing more firearms than any other state.

The last days of May and first week of June, there were more than 90 attempted or successful burglaries of gun stores, according to the Bureau of Alcohol, Tobacco, Firearms and Explosives. More than 1,000 guns were stolen in that window of time. On May 31 alone the BATF reported 29 separate burglaries targeting licensed firearm retailers.

=== Allegations of foreign involvement ===
There have been allegations of foreign influence stoking the unrest online, with the role of outside powers being additive rather than decisive as of May 31. The founder and CEO of Graphika, which helped the U.S. Senate form its report on Russian social media influence during the 2016 elections, noted "very active engagement" from account clusters from Russia, Iran, and China, and as of May 31 noted that his team was launching an investigation on the matter of possible foreign influence. However, on June 3, 2020, Graphika released a report concluding that "State-controlled media outlets and official public diplomacy accounts in China, Iran, and Russia are focusing on the anti-racism protests in the United States, but they are primarily doing so in a way that furthers their existing narratives, rather than stoking American divisions," adding that "there is no evidence as yet to suggest a large-scale, covert interference campaign". Several analysts have said that there was a lack of evidence for foreign meddling – whether to spread disinformation or sow divisiveness – but suggest that the messaging and coverage from these countries has more so to do with global politics.

On May 30, Republican Senator Marco Rubio, the current acting Senate Intelligence Committee chairman, asserted "very heavy" social media activity linked to "at least three foreign adversaries," noting that while they "didn't create these divisions," they are "actively stoking and promoting violence". On May 31, after being asked about Rubio's comments, the National Security Advisor Robert C. O'Brien said that there may be Russian activists who are exploiting the situation, but also, in reference to Chinese officials posting on social media, that the difference is that "... it's open. It's coming straight from the government."

The former National Security Advisor Susan Rice, acknowledging that she had no evidence, stated that the violence that was emerging was "right out of the Russian playbook". The claim drew angry responses from Russian officials, including Foreign Ministry spokeswoman Maria Zakharova who said that Rice is trying to blame Russia again for the United States' own domestic problems instead of facing her own people. Pro-western commentators have also criticized Rice for blaming domestic problems on foreign machinations. On June 9, the Russian Presidential Press Secretary Dmitry Peskov said "We consider it to be a domestic affair of the United States and we don’t want to interfere," adding that "When we first saw the outbreaks of those riots in the U.S. the first thing we heard is one of the voices saying ‘well, probably, Russia is staying behind those riots’. It's very hard for us to understand these comments and the reason for them."

Nathaniel Gleicher, head of security policy at Facebook, stated that they found no evidence of foreign interference on their site, even though its security teams were actively searching for signs of it.

In a virtual press conference on June 4, Mayor of Miami-Dade Carlos A. Giménez and the head of the County Police Freddy Ramírez announced that the FBI has taken over work on the question of foreign financing of the protests, as it is a federal, not state, matter. The FBI announced on June 3 that it had arrested in Miami and elsewhere groups of Venezuelans, Haitians (from "Little Haiti"), Cubans, and Hondurans who were being paid to cause violence at demonstrations. Those arrested admitted they had been hired by unidentified "activists", who even provided funds for transportation to the demonstrations. Two carried large quantities of cash; the FBI is trying to determine the origin of the money, and "Cuban and Venezuelan intelligence agencies" is a possibility they are investigating. The presence of the [Bolivian] "Che Guevara Brigade" was noted. Those arrested allegedly included a Sandinista from Nicaragua, Venezuelan supporters of President Hugo Chávez (who died in 2013), and a supporter of revolution in Bolivia.

== Reports of extremist activities in the United States ==
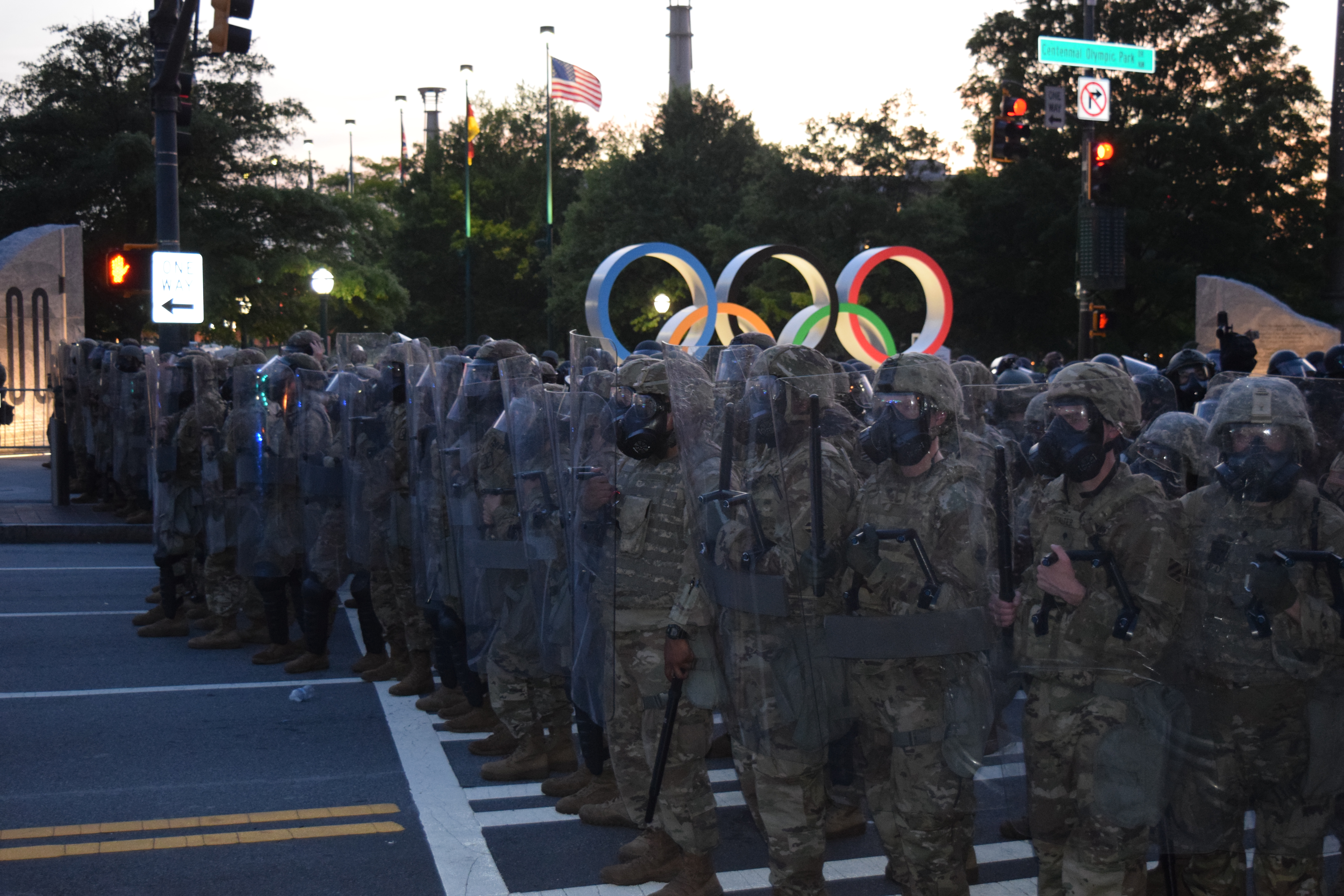
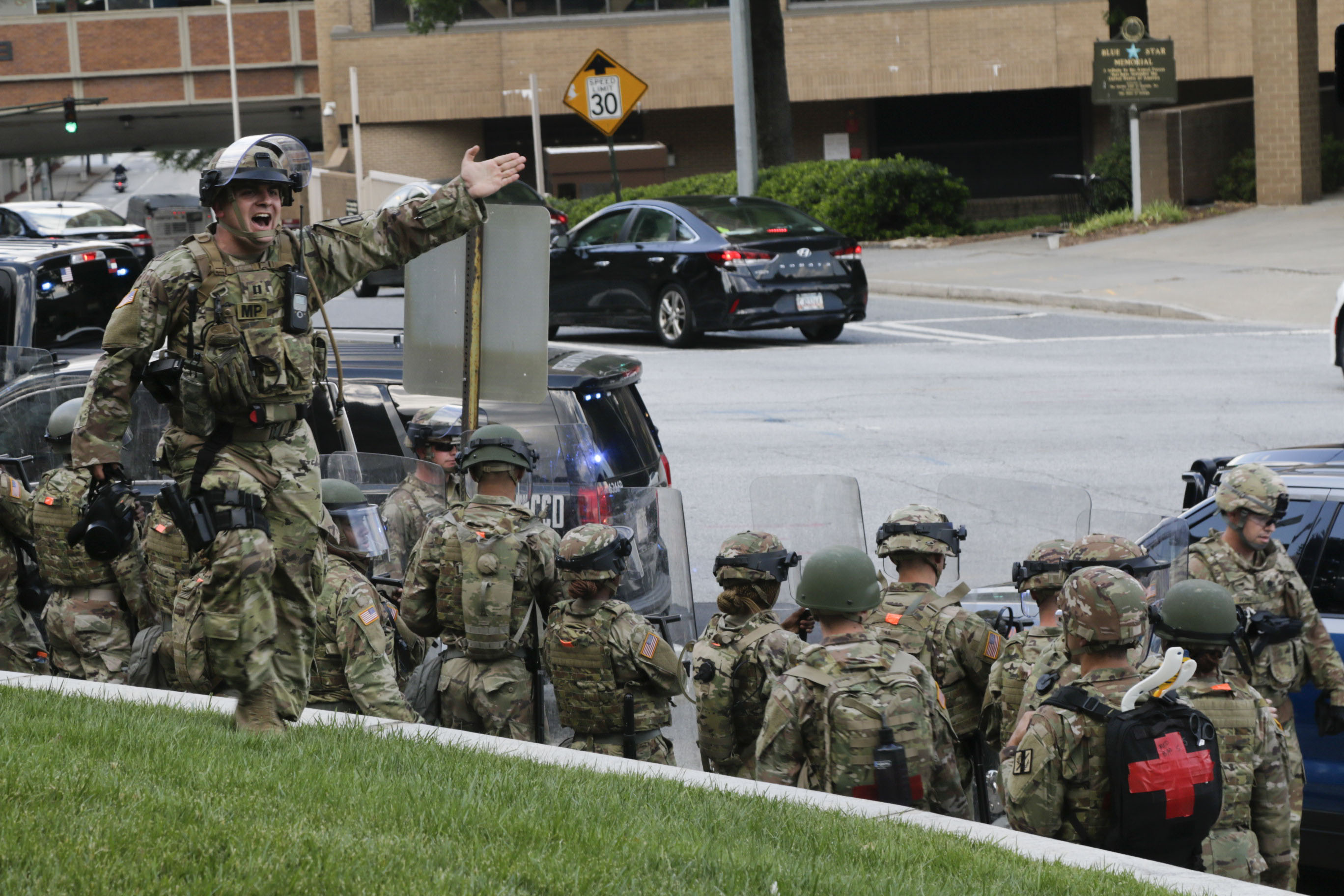
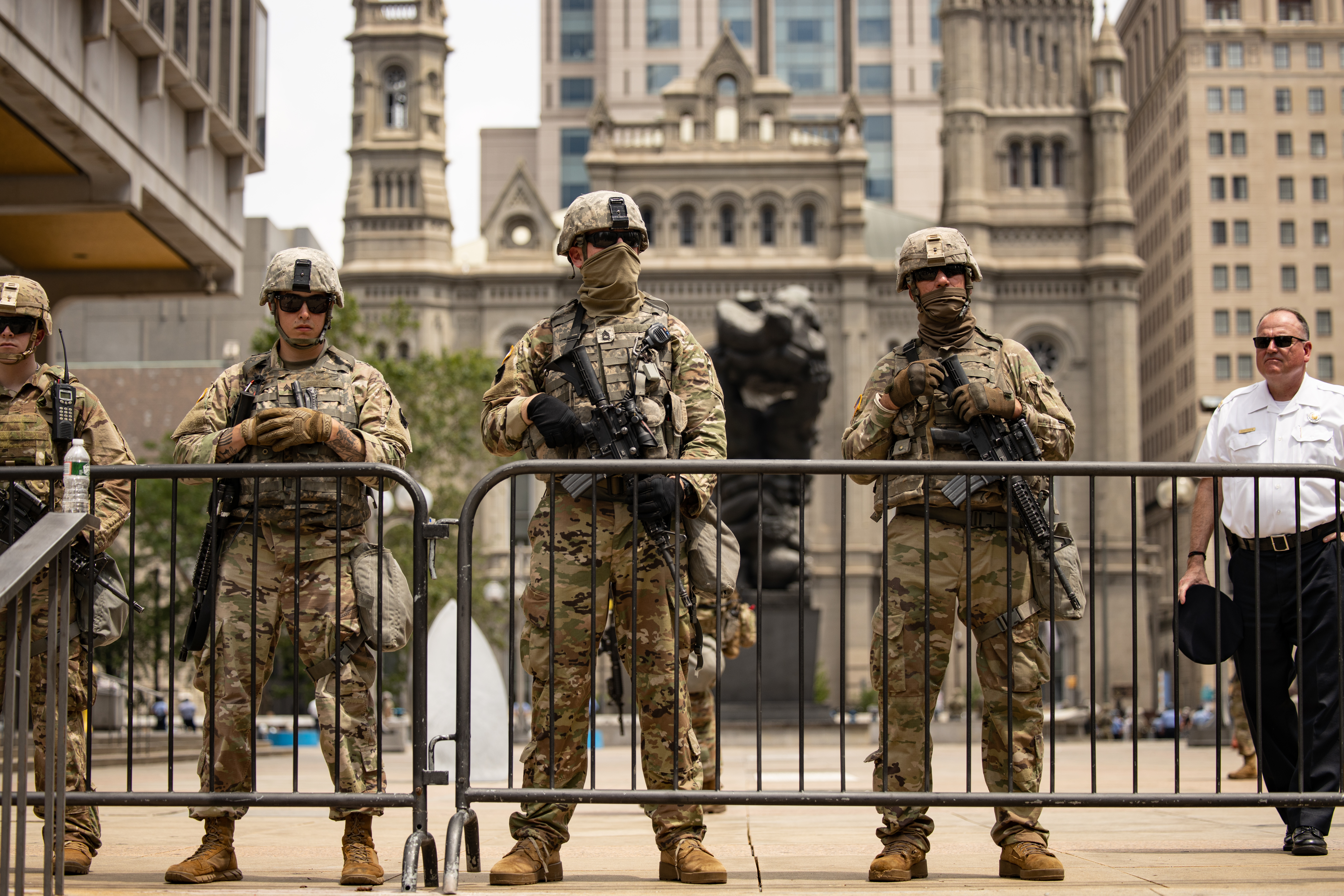
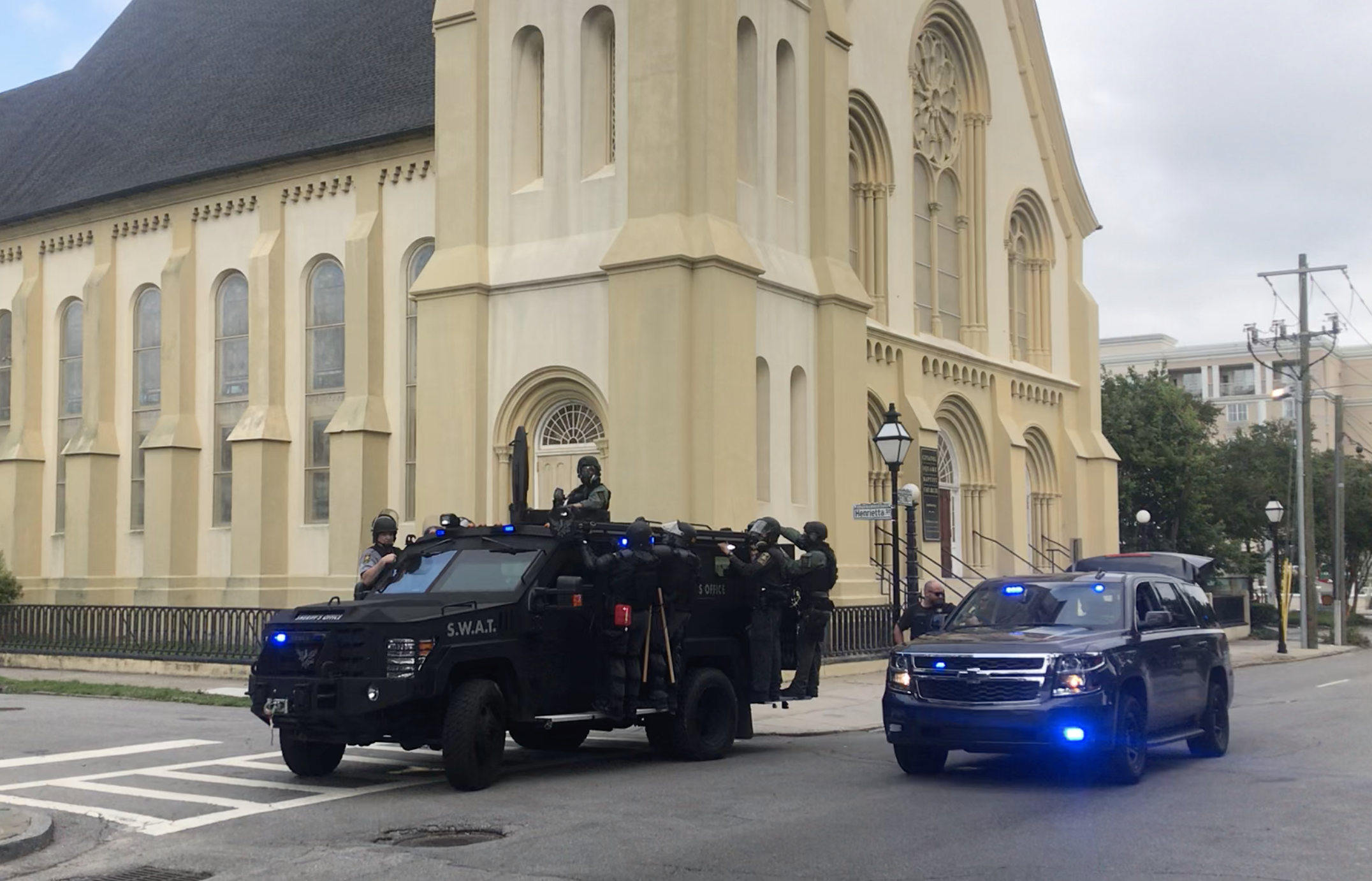
The National Guard was deployed in multiple states during the height of the unrest.
Clockwise from top left: Georgia National Guard form a shield wall in Atlanta's Centennial Olympic Park while enforcing curfew on June 1; a guardsman directs his soldiers during protests in Atlanta on June 1; SWAT units impose a curfew across Charleston County, South Carolina, on May 31; Pennsylvania National Guard in Philadelphia on June 6

There have been accusations of various extremist groups using the cover of the protests to foment general unrest in the United States. There are claims that groups are placing bricks and other materials nearby areas of unrest to escalate protester action, although multiple people on Twitter suggested that these were deliberately left unattended by police.

=== Far-left and anarchist involvement ===
FBI Director Christopher A. Wray, New York City Mayor Bill de Blasio, United States Attorney General William Barr, Atlanta Mayor Keisha Lance Bottoms, Seattle Police Guild President Mike Solan, and Huntsville, Alabama Police Chief Mark McMurray blamed anarchists and far-left extremist groups, including antifa, for inciting and organizing violent riots. According to a Justice Department spokesperson, Barr came to this conclusion after being provided with information from state and local law enforcement agencies.

==== Antifa and anarchists ====
On May 31, Trump announced that he planned to designate "Antifa" as a terrorist organization. Some government and non-government officials argued that antifa could not be designated a terrorist group due to the idea that it is "not an organization" and that designating domestic terrorist groups is prohibited by the First Amendment and federal law restricting the designation of terrorist organizations to foreign entities due to concerns pertaining to the First Amendment's speech and assembly rights.

During a press conference, Pittsburgh Police Chief Scott Schubert said he was "willing to bet his check" that "there's a lot of people who are anarchists" who cause "damage and injury". He added that "[i]t's just a damn shame that they took advantage of the situation, for something [that] happened in another state where somebody died who shouldn't have died, and they hijacked that message for their own". In Pittsburgh, a man was arrested for allegedly starting riots over the weekend that ended in violence. The police chief said that "'anarchists' likely hijacked peaceful protests downtown". Deputy Commissioner for Intelligence and Counterterrorism of the NYPD John Miller said there is a high level of confidence within the department that unnamed "anarchist groups" had planned to commit vandalism and violence in advance. On June 4, FBI Director Christopher A. Wray stated in a press release that "anarchists like Antifa" are "exploiting this situation to pursue violent, extremist agendas." In July 2020, Wray testified to the Senate Judiciary Committee that the agency "considers antifa more of an ideology than an organization", contradicting Trump's remarks about antifa and putting him at odds with the Trump administration. This resulted in Trump publicly criticizing Wray, hinting that he could fire him over Wray's testimony about antifa and Russian interference in the 2020 United States elections.

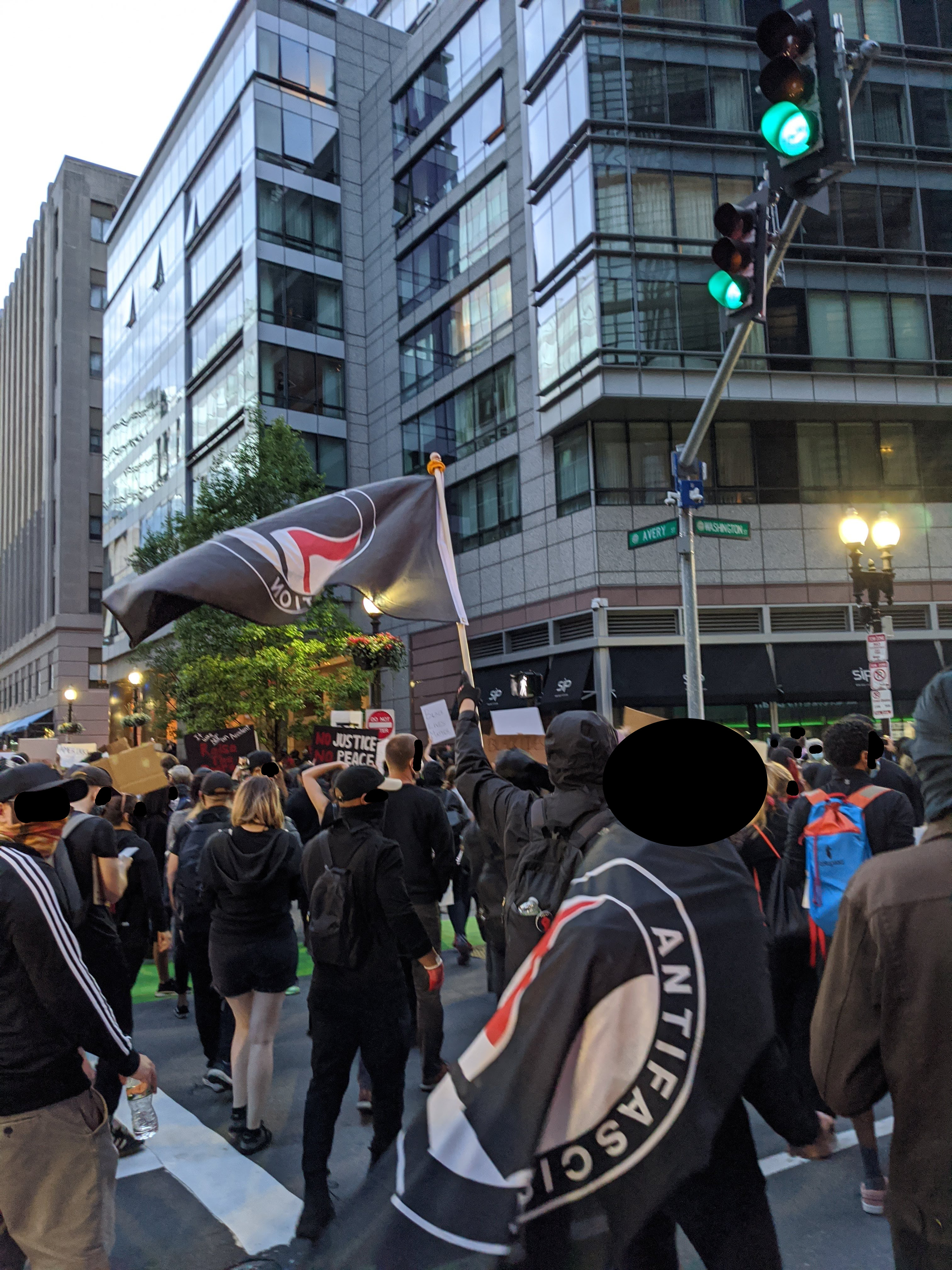
Protesters with Antifa flags in Boston, May 31, 2020

By June 2020, none of the 51 people facing federal charges were alleged to have links to Antifa. According to the Houston Chronicle, at least three alleged looters in Austin, Texas, were affiliated with Antifa. Contrastly, a mid-June investigation by The Washington Post concluded there was no solid evidence of Antifa involvement in causing violence during the protests, contradicting prior claims by law enforcement officials. This is in part because "Antifa is a moniker, not a single group", making it difficult to attribute any violence directly to the movement. According to a report by researchers affiliated with Rutgers University, left-wing groups are now employing "many of the same tactics against police and other targets during the social justice protests since the death of George Floyd". As of September 2020, no Antifa or left-wing group has been charged in connection with the civil unrest. However, Michael Forest Reinoehl, an anti-fascist protester who gave contrasting statements about Antifa, stating that he was "100% anti-fascist" but "not a member of Antifa" or "anything", has been implicated in the late August killing of a Trump supporter in Portland. According to Brian Levin, director of the Center for the Study of Hate and Extremism at the California State University, if Reinoehl is implicated in the case, "it would mark the first time in recent years that an antifa supporter has been charged with homicide" as "hard-left violence has generally been less fatal and more directed towards property, racists and to a lesser extent police and journalists" which is unlike "the white supremacist and the far right, which glorifies mass violence by loners and small cells against minorities and enemies". Gary LaFree, chairman of the University of Maryland's criminology department, stated that "the case could potentially be included in the university's Global Terrorism Database as the first act of terror linked to Antifa". Reinoehl was later killed by law enforcement during an attempted apprehension.

Some anti-capitalist, anti-fascist and police abolitionist groups consider the civil unrest in the United States as part of a broader revolution. The Pacific Northwest Youth Liberation Front from Portland are a police abolitionist group who seek to "show the world that the fire of this uprising is still burning strong, and that flames will just keep getting bigger until the police state has been dismantled once and for all". Speaking at the Mark O. Hatfield United States Courthouse in mid July, one Portland rally organizer said that she organizes for "the abolition of not just the militarized police state but also the United States as we know it".

==== CHAZ/CHOP ====
A collective of protesters, "including self-identified anarchist extremists and those affiliated with Antifa", demonstrated against the Seattle Police Department through the occupation of a six-block area of the Capitol Hill neighborhood, self-proclaimed as the Capitol Hill Occupied Protest (CHOP), also identified as the Capitol Hill Organized Protest, and later renamed to the Capitol Hill Autonomous Zone (CHAZ). According to an analysis by the New Jersey Office of Homeland Security and Preparedness, "[s]everal social media accounts affiliated with anarchist extremists and Antifa have openly claimed members are present and active in the area, posting their involvement in the takeover of the CHAZ and advocating a standoff if their long list of demands is not met." Furthermore, it stated:

Despite reports of a peaceful takeover, the [Seattle Police Department] has heard of individuals checking for identification at barricades before entering the zone without the authority to do so. Additionally, there are reports of citizens and businesses being asked to pay a fee to operate within this area, and some residents cannot access their homes or businesses. The barricades are preventing the Seattle fire and police departments from accessing and responding to emergencies in and around the area, noting their response time has slowed considerably due to the roadblocks.

There were, however, no requests or demands for fees by anyone of the businesses operating inside of CHAZ. Most of the businesses were still closed due to the COVID 19 pandemic. There were also no actual incidents of identification requirements or requests.

CHOP/CHAZ was not centrally organized, but included a temporary stage and sound system where community members shared with the participants about their experiences with law enforcement in Seattle. Members of the Seattle Police Department were observed to be present in plain clothes. Members of the Washington State National Guard were present as participants, and one National Guardsman spoke on stage in support of the protest zone.

There were 2 separate areas of remembrance where people left flowers, candles, letter, and drawings commemorating the lives of people who died from being shot by police, both locally and nationally. One exterior wall of a building was dedicated to posting ideas for law enforcement policy goals.

On June 7 a man, later identified as Nikolas Fernandez drove a black Honda Civic into the crowd. As the vehicle was in motion, protester Daniel Gregory reached in the driver's side window. Fernandez then shot Gregory in the arm, exited the vehicle and ran through the barricades to the police line without incident. Fernandez, whose brother works at the East Precinct, shot Gregory with a Glock 26 that had extended magazines taped together. Initially charged with first degree assault. The Fernandez trial was delayed several times. Fernandez plead guilty to reckless driving and agreed to a sentence of 24 months probation, a 30-day driver’s license suspension, and court costs and fines. Fernandez is the brother of an officer who worked at the Capitol Hill precinct.

On June 20, a 19-year-old man was killed and another person was hospitalized with life-threatening injuries after being fired on multiple times inside the CHAZ. Nine days later, a 16-year-old boy was killed and a 14-year-old was critically injured in their Jeep Grand Cherokee after being shot in the zone.

==== Hackers and cyberattacks ====
Minneapolis experienced an increase in cyberattacks, led by hacktivist groups, in the immediate aftermath of Floyd's murder. Malicious actors caused temporary outages of Minnesota statewide emergency community systems by deploying denial of service attacks. Minneapolis also experienced an increase of ransomware, cryptomining, and malware infections to its systems.

=== Far-right and white supremacist involvement ===
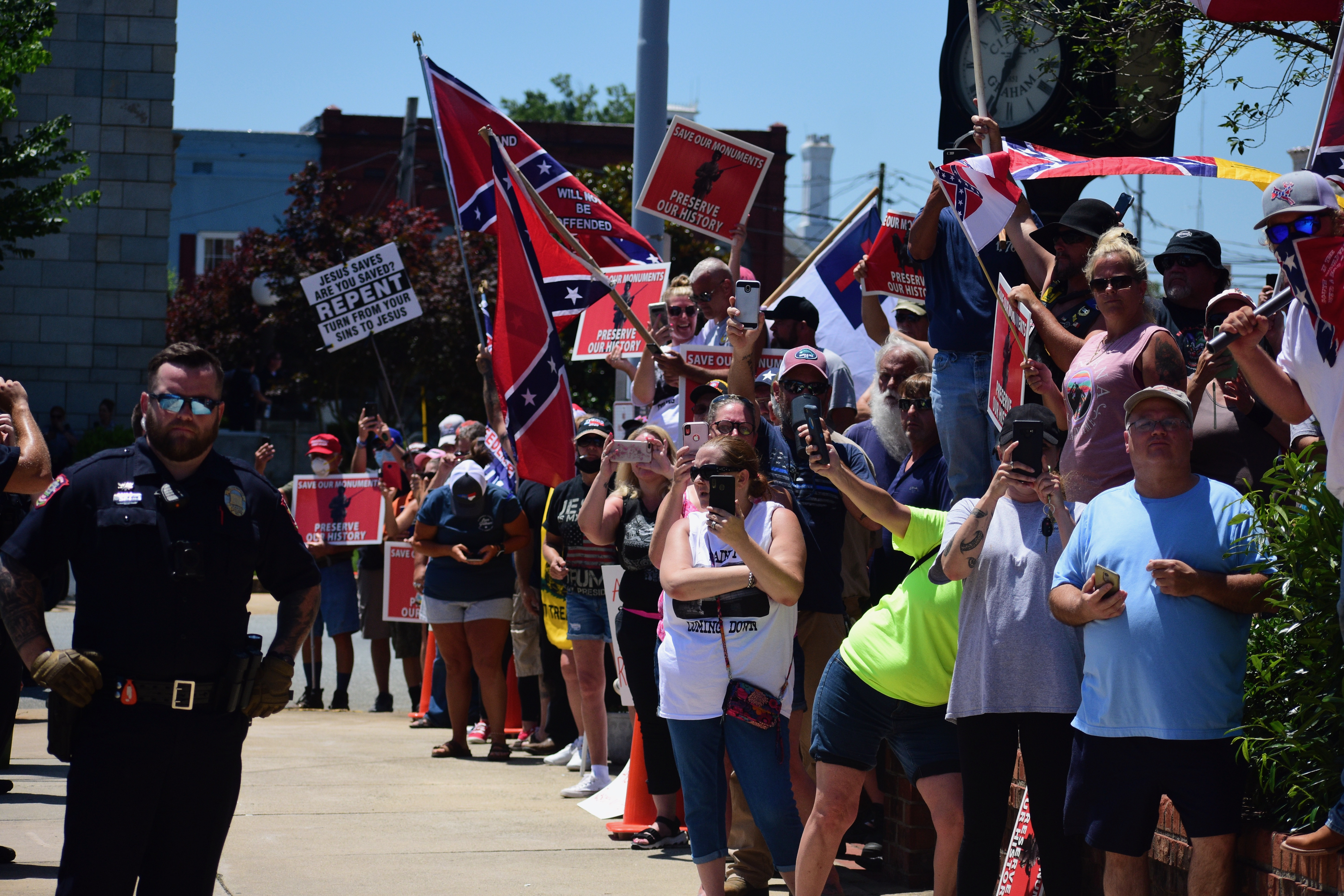
Counter-protesters in Graham, North Carolina on July 11, 2020

At least 50 incidents of vehicles driving into crowds of protesters were recorded from May 27 to June 17, with four ruled accidental and five involving police officers. Since 2015, such actions have been encouraged against Black Lives Matter protests by "Run Them Over" and "All Lives Splatter" memes online, as well as items posted on Fox News and on social media by police officers.

Vice and New York University's Reiss Center reported that far-right accelerationists, who aim to exacerbate tensions and speed up the supposed coming of a "civil war", have urged followers online to use the protests as an occasion to carry out violence; an eco-fascist Telegram channel with almost 2500 subscribers posted on the 28th that "a riot would be the perfect place to commit a murder." Analysis by Vice and the New York Times also noted the proliferation of chatter on 4chan hailing the violence as the beginning of a "race war." Such tactics match a long running history of accelerationists exploiting moments of political and/or civil unrest to, in the words of historian Stuart Wexler, "produce racial polarization and eventual retaliation."

According to a Twitter spokesperson, an account pretending to belong to a national "antifa" organization and pushing violent rhetoric related to ongoing protests has been linked to the white nationalist group Identity Evropa; Identity Evropa denied the claims. According to an internal FBI situation report on the May 31 protests, individuals from a far-right social media group had "called for far-right provocateurs to attack federal agents, use automatic weapons against protesters."

==== Incidents by date ====
In late July 2020, arson investigators with the Minneapolis police announced that they had identified the "Umbrella Man" who was seen on a widely circulated video breaking windows at an AutoZone store near the third police precinct station on May 27, which set off a chain reaction of looting and rioting, including the store and many other buildings being burned to the ground. The suspect, a 32-year-old man, had ties to the Hells Angels and Aryan Cowboy Brotherhood as well participated in a confrontation in Stillwater, Minnesota involving a Muslim woman in June. As of July 28, 2020, the man had not yet been charged with a crime. A local police investigator said he was deliberately attempting to incite rioting and looting.

On May 29, Minnesota Governor Tim Walz noted then-unconfirmed reports of white supremacists as well as drug cartels taking advantage of the protests. He also claimed that a large portion of the protesters were coming from out of state to instigate violence, though this was later shown to be false and the statements were walked back. Minnesota Department of Public Safety Commissioner John Harrington noted that some white supremacist groups had posted messages online that encouraged people to go loot in Minneapolis and cause mayhem.

On May 30, Minnesota officials including Minnesota Attorney General Keith Ellison, Governor Tim Walz, Minneapolis Mayor Jacob Frey, and St. Paul Mayor Melvin Carter stated they believed that white nationalists were using the protests as cover for inciting violence, and that Minnesota officials were monitoring the ongoing far-right online effort to incite violence. On the other hand, Howard Graves, an analyst at the Southern Poverty Law Center stated on May 31 that he did not see clear evidence of "white supremacists or militiamen" heading out to "burn and loot." The University of St. Thomas' Lisa Waldner, an analyst of the American white supremacist and anarchist movements, has noted that the goal of many of the individuals involved in the destruction of Minneapolis was to create chaos so as to pursue their own agendas. White nationalist Facebook groups reportedly began urging members to "get their loot on." In at least 20 cities across the country as of May 31, members of hate groups and far-right organizations filmed themselves at the demonstrations.

On the evening of June 7, in Lakeside, Virginia, witnesses reported that a truck-driver deliberately drove into protesters. No one was seriously injured; a suspect was arrested. The county attorney described the suspect as "an admitted leader of the Ku Klux Klan and a propagandist for Confederate ideology" and said he may be charged with a hate crime.

On June 15, a confrontation between a protester (Scott Williams) and counter-protester (Steven Baca) at the Statue of Juan de Oñate at the Albuquerque Museum of Art and History lead to Williams being shot. Before the shooting, protesters had attempted to tear down the statue. Shooting charges were later dropped against Baca after online images emerged showing Williams holding what is rumored to be a knife. The shooting drew attention to the armed civilians that had been turning up at Floyd protests and their apparent coordination with law enforcement. The New Mexico Patriots group, which was present at the shooting, was accused of intimidating people of color and promoting right-wing material. Albuquerque Police officers were videotaped directing armed civilians during protests. Police dispatch radio referred to "heavily armed friendlies" on a roof overlooking a protest. A member of the group New Mexico Patriots stated that they had "worked with APD for many years now."

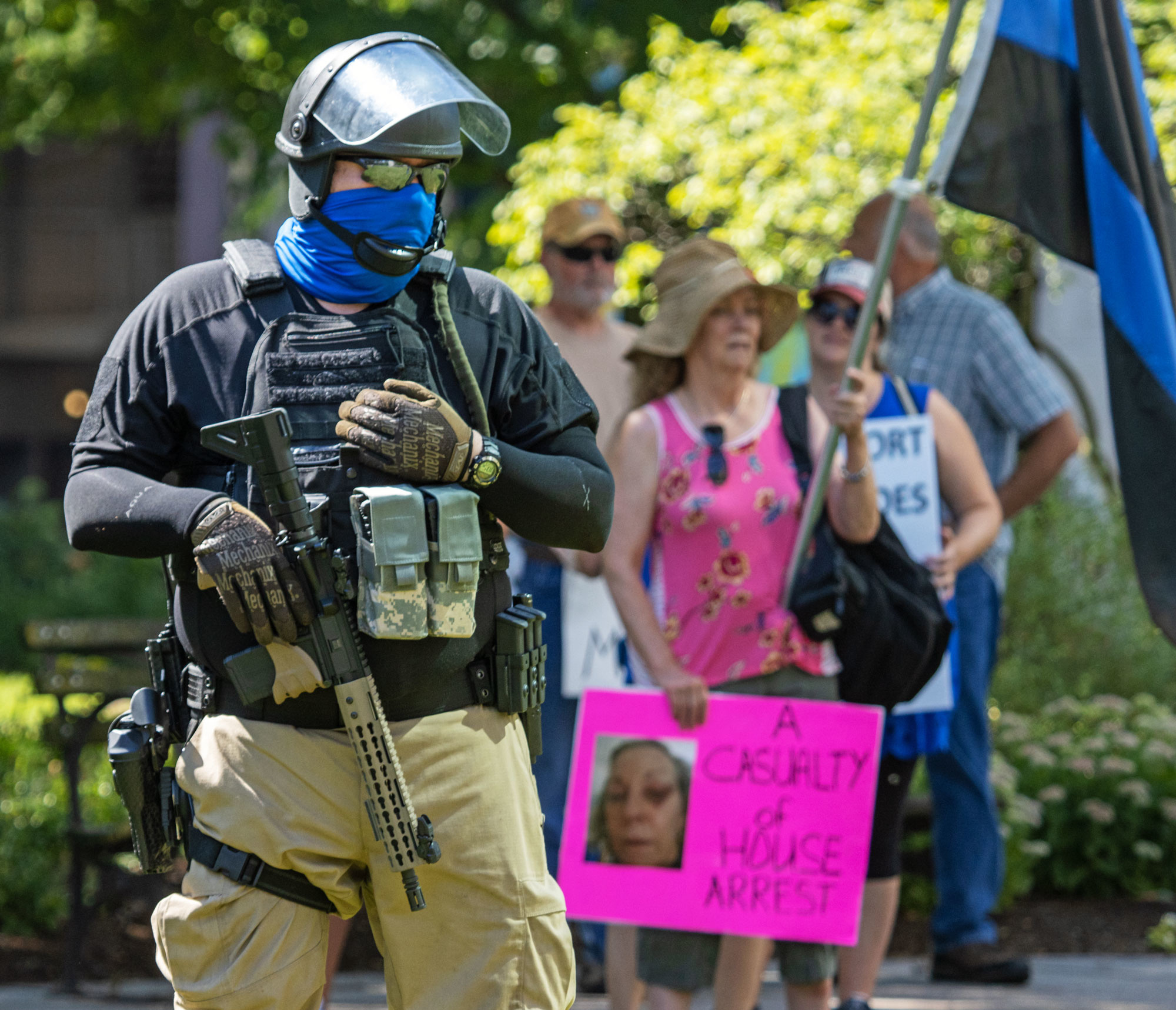
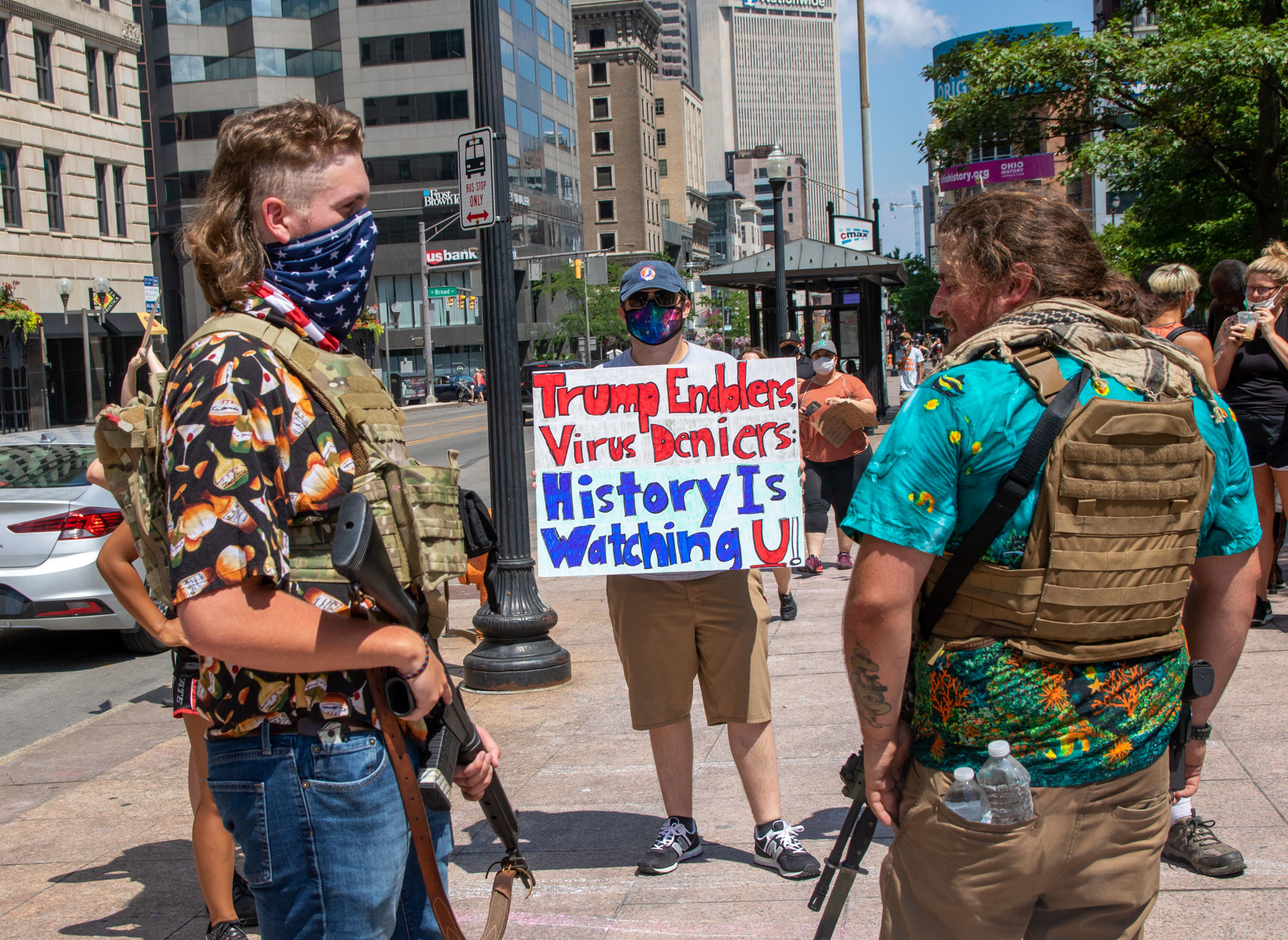
Armed counter-protesters in Columbus, Ohio on July 18, 2020

On June 25, three police officers from Wilmington, North Carolina, were fired after they were caught in a leaked audio tape using derogatory remarks to describe black Americans, saying that they should be slaughtered and that "there should be another civil war to wipe them off the (expletive) map." It was later revealed that two of the officers had previous disciplinary issues with the department, including one officer who had been fired but rehired 4 days later.

==== Boogaloo movement ====
The boogaloo movement, an armed anti-government and far-right extremist movement that seeks a Second American Civil War and whose members are identifiable at times for wearing Hawaiian shirts, have been reported at the protests. Participants of the boogaloo movement at the George Floyd protests had a range of intentions, much like the ideologies behind the movement, with some individuals expressing support for or opposition to the protests, while others simply sought to rile up crowds. Administrators of the Facebook page Big Igloo Bois, a splinter of the boogaloo movement, called for members to attend the protests with one administrator stating, "come in peace, prepare for there to be violence." Some of the boogaloo groups have espoused white supremacist views. Other groups such as the Big Igloo Bois have aimed to make common cause with the Black Lives Matter movement due to their shared mistrust of the police.

On June 3, three men who identified with the boogaloo movement were arrested in Las Vegas and charged by the Joint Terrorism Task Force for reportedly plotting to commit violent acts to incite a riot and terrorism charges. The three men also had military experience, and were plotting to attack economic targets prior to the protests in May.

Boogaloo supporter Steven Carillo shot and killed a Federal security guard in Oakland, California on May 29 during a Floyd protest, later killing a police officer on June 6. The apparent motive was to ignite broader violence, though the ideological motive remains unclear. Prior to the attacks, Carillo posted on social media, "Go to the riots and support our own cause. Show them the real targets. Use their anger to fuel our fire. Think outside the box. We have mobs of angry people to use to our advantage." By September 2020, at least fifteen people affiliated with the boogaloo movement had been arrested and five deaths had been publicly linked to boogaloo rhetoric.

On October 21, an adult male claiming to be connected to the boogaloo movement was arrested in San Antonio and charged with a count of "interstate travel to incite a riot" for actions they had taken in May in Minneapolis. The male was apparently filmed firing rounds in the Minneapolis Police Department's 3rd Precinct. The charges also alleged that he helped to set the 3rd Precinct on fire and had received money from Carillo in June.
