= George Floyd protests in Alabama =

2020 civil unrest after the murder of George Floyd

- Part of George Floyd protests
- Date: May 28 – June 7, 2020 (1 week and 3 days)
- Location: Alabama, United States
- Caused by: Police brutality; Institutional racism against African Americans; Reaction to the murder of George Floyd; Economic, racial and social inequality

Map of George Floyd Protests in Alabama

This is a list of George Floyd protests in Alabama, United States. Protests occurred in fourteen various communities in the state.

== Locations ==
=== Anniston ===
A crowd protested peacefully along Quintard Avenue on June 1 and 2.

=== Ashland ===
A crowd protested peacefully in front of the Clay County courthouse on June 2.

=== Auburn ===
Hundreds of demonstrators held a largely peaceful protest on May 31 in downtown Auburn at Toomer's Corner.

=== Birmingham ===
An estimated 1,000 people gathered on May 31 for a rally and march. The protests became increasingly violent as the day went on; by the evening, demonstrators downtown toppled a statue of Charles Linn, damaged a Thomas Jefferson statue, and broke windows with rocks at the Jefferson County courthouse downtown while also attempting to tear down a 115-year-old Confederate monument at Linn Park, prompting police to eventually disperse the crowd; mayor Randall Woodfin personally attended the park rally, urging peaceful protest. By nightfall, demonstrators had moved from the park and began setting fires, looting and vandalizing several businesses, including breaking into the bottom floor of a skyscraper housing a Wells Fargo bank and setting the California Fashion Mall ablaze. Rioters also attacked several members of the media, with at least one TV reporter being struck in the head with a bottle; sporadic gunfire was also reportedly heard throughout the night.

Police said the overnight riots resulted in burglaries at 14 businesses with another 13 businesses that had significant damage, while firefighters responded to more than 22 fires including five at commercial buildings. There were also three house fires linked to the rioting, as well as multiple vehicle and dumpster fires, according to authorities. On June 1, the mayor declared a curfew and an indefinite state of emergency for the city and pledged to remove the Confederate monument at Linn Park. The monument was partially removed by city authorities on June 2. Local comedian Jermaine "FunnyMaine" Johnson was arrested on June 11 for inciting a riot after he spoke at the May 31 rally where he listed a number of locations demonstrators should "not" attack, including "not" tearing down the Charles Linn statue. He was released on $500 bond and the charges were dropped by June 17.

On June 6, hundreds of demonstrators gathered outside of Legion Field where they rallied and then jogged in place for eight minutes – the reported amount of time officer Derek Chauvin knelt on George Floyd's neck – while chanting "I can't breathe".

=== Butler ===
More than 60 protesters peacefully marched to the Choctaw County Courthouse on June 5.

=== Decatur ===
Hundreds attended a peaceful protest at the Morgan County Courthouse and nearby areas on May 31.

=== Dothan ===
On May 31, a large crowd gathered peacefully at the Houston County Courthouse, holding signs, chanting, and listening to speakers.

=== Enterprise ===
On June 3, a large crowd of protesters peacefully demonstrated along Rucker Boulevard against racism and police brutality.

=== Florence ===
On May 31, dozens of protesters gathered on Seminary Street and marched peacefully to the Lauderdale County Courthouse. Police blocked intersections to assist the demonstration

=== Hoover ===
George Floyd protest held at Hoover City Hall on June 6, 2020. (video provided by Starnes Media)

At least 100 protesters attended a march along U.S. Route 31 to the Hoover Municipal complex on May 30; 20 people were arrested. Around 300 people peacefully rallied in front of the Hoover Municipal complex on June 6, ending before 4:00 pm. Afterwards, a group of 100 broke off and protested along Municipal Drive before being arrested by Hoover police, 23 of which were for disorderly conduct; more than 15 protesters voluntarily stepped forward to be arrested. The protesters faced off against 80 officers, taunting and conversing, before concluding the demonstration around 6:45 pm before the 7:00 pm curfew.

=== Huntsville ===
Protesters marched through downtown on May 30. On June 1, a protest began at 3:00 pm with speakers, music and an eight-minute moment of silence at the Madison County Courthouse; over 1,000 people joined the protest. The white mayor and a black city councilman asked people to "protest responsibly and peacefully." The mayor "took a knee" and begged the protesters to leave in a responsible manner. The protest officially ended at 8:00 pm, and police had asked they disperse starting at 6:00 pm, but over one hundred refused to leave the area. An activist leader replied, "It's not about black response. It's about privilege response." Police fired tear gas to disperse the crowd. Two people were arrested at the protest. One was charged with carrying a firearm at a demonstration.

Two days later, on the evening of June 3, protesters chanting "we are peaceful" in front of Madison County Courthouse were dispersed with tear gas, pepper spray, and rubber bullets. Most of the members of the protest had marched from the NAACP Rally Against Police Brutality, which ended when its permit expired at 6:30. Less-lethal munitions were deployed at roughly 8:00, after which more than 20 arrests were made. Huntsville Police Department Chief Mark McMurray provided an after-action report to the Huntsville City Council two weeks later, during which he outlined suspected Antifa presence and concerns of looting, riots, and violence as justification for the use of force; these concerns were supported with little evidence, instead referencing social media posts and other questionable sources.

Beginning on June 2, a man named Terry Willis began walking 1,000 miles (1,600 km) from Huntsville to the site of George Floyd's murder in Minneapolis to honor him. After stopping in Kentucky and Missouri to pay respects to Breonna Taylor and Michael Brown, victims of law enforcement shootings that also resulted in protests, he arrived at George Floyd Square on July 12.

=== Mobile ===
On May 31, a march starting at Mardi Gras Park looped around the city and returned to the park. A part of the group attempted to block I-10, but they were stopped by police, who blocked the road themselves and later dispersed the crowd with tear gas. A police van window was smashed, but a public safety director distributed his phone number asking them to express their concerns.

On June 6, around 75 protesters marched from a statue of pro-Confederate Reverend Abram Joseph Ryan to Mardi Gras Park, where they demanded that civic leaders rename the George Wallace Tunnel, de-fund the police department to increase investment in black communities, and permanently remove Confederate monuments and replace them with notable African Americans from Mobile, among other requests.

=== Montgomery ===
Hundreds of people protested on the steps of the Alabama State Capitol on May 30.

On June 6, a peaceful rally was held at the Alabama Department of Archives and History building, where speakers demanded voter registration and more political activism, among other topics. Several Montgomery police officers joined the protesters, holding signs of support. Police Chief Ernest Finley said he was focusing on increasing community engagement and emphasizing tolerance and patience among police forces moving forward.

=== Opelika ===
A crowd protested downtown on May 30.

=== Troy ===
About 50 people, many of them students demonstrated peacefully on May 29 at the square in downtown Troy.

=== Tuscaloosa ===
About 400 people marched and rallied peacefully on May 31 at the federal courthouse downtown. A smaller crowd of dozens of people marched peacefully downtown on June 3. A separate downtown protest saw 1,000 demonstrators peacefully march and rally, where State Representative Chris England and Southern Christian Leadership Conference National President Charles Steele Jr. spoke to the crowd.

200 protesters rallied at Snow Hinton Park on June 6, where the crowd marched along the park's trail eight times representing the eight minutes George Floyd was pinned to the ground during his arrest. 1,000 people peacefully rallied downtown on June 7, where Tuscaloosa Mayor Walt Maddox spoke, among others. Alabama men's basketball head coach Nate Oats and University of Alabama athletics director Greg Byrne also participated.

== See also ==
- List of George Floyd protests in the United States
- List of George Floyd protests outside the United States
