= List of public art in Birmingham, Alabama =

This is a list of public art in Birmingham, Alabama, in the United States. This list applies only to works of public art on permanent display in an outdoor public space. For example, this does not include artworks in museums. Public art may include sculptures, statues, monuments, memorials, murals, and mosaics.

Image	Title / subject	Location and coordinates	Date	Artist / designer	Type	Material	Dimensions	Designation	Owner / administrator	Wikidata	Notes
	Confederate Soldiers and Sailors Monument	Linn Park 33.52007°N 86.80948°W	1905		Obelisk					Q96035904	Removed in 2020
	Statue of Charles Linn	Linn Park 33°31′12″N 86°48′35″W	2013	Branko Medenica	Statue	Bronze; Granite				Q96038390	Removed in 2020
More images	Vulcan statue	Red Mountain 33°29′30.18″N 86°47′43.86″W	1904	Giuseppe Moretti	Statue	Iron				Q7943500	
