= Iconoclasm =

Destruction of religious images

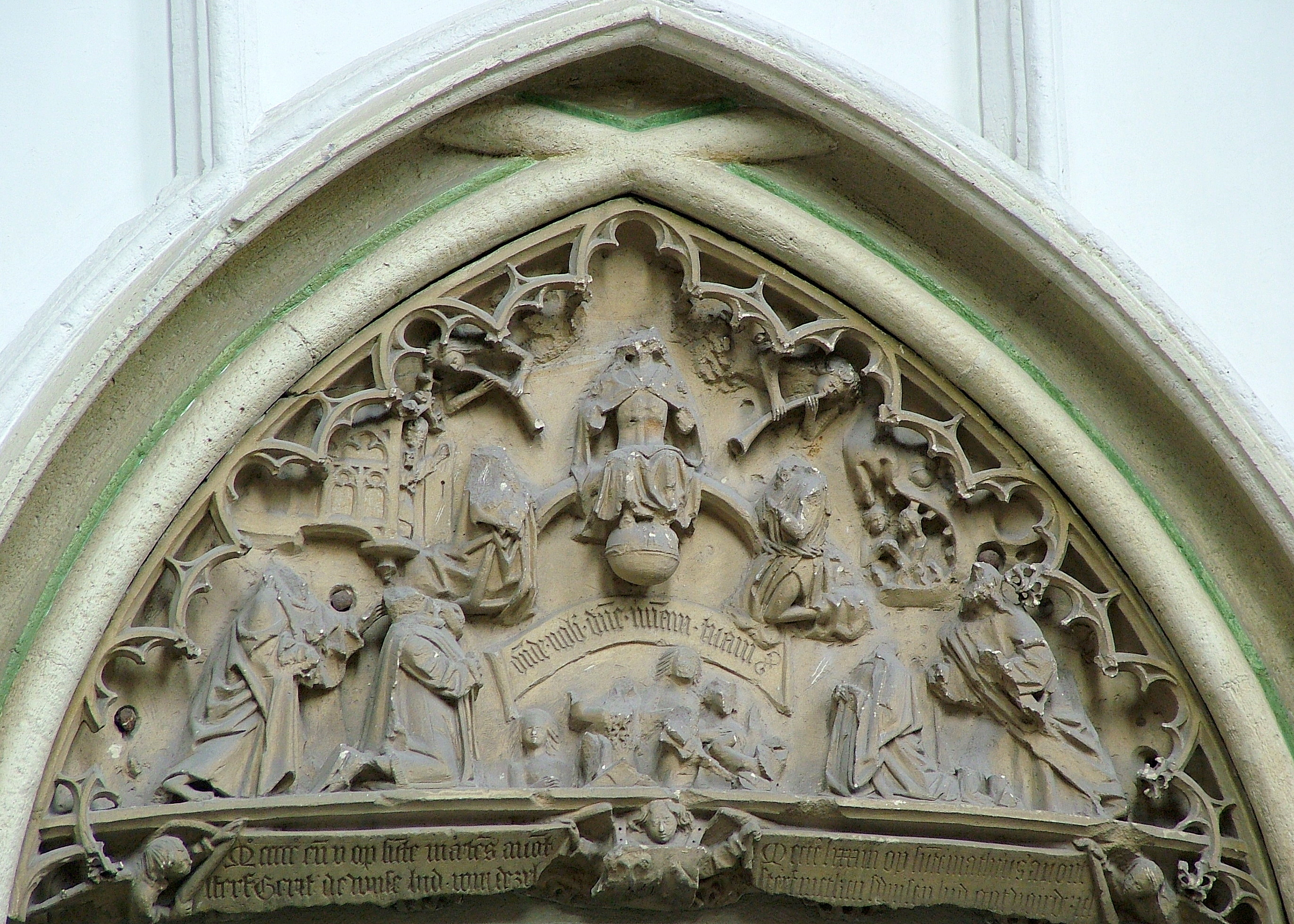
16th-century iconoclasm in the Protestant Reformation. Relief statues in St. Stevenskerk in Nijmegen, Netherlands, were attacked and defaced by Calvinists in the Beeldenstorm.

Iconoclasm (from Ancient Greek εἰκών (eikṓn) 'figure, icon' and κλάω (kláō) 'to break') (Note: From Ancient Greek: εἰκών + κλάω, romanized: eikṓn + kláō, lit. 'image-breaking'. Iconoclasm may also be considered as a back-formation from iconoclast (Greek: εἰκοκλάστης). The corresponding Greek word for iconoclasm is εἰκονοκλασία (eikonoklasia).) is the belief in the importance of the destruction of icons and other images or monuments, often for religious or political reasons. Those who engage in or support iconoclasm are called iconoclasts, a term that has come to be applied figuratively and more broadly to anyone who challenges "cherished beliefs or venerated institutions on the grounds that they are erroneous or pernicious".

Conversely, one who reveres or venerates religious images is called (by iconoclasts) an iconolater; in a Byzantine context, such a person is called an iconodule or iconophile. Iconoclasm does not generally encompass the destruction of the images of a specific ruler after their death or overthrow, a practice better known as damnatio memoriae.

While iconoclasm may be carried out by adherents of a different religion, it is more commonly the result of sectarian disputes between factions of the same religion. The term originates from the Byzantine Iconoclasm, the struggles between proponents and opponents of religious icons in the Byzantine Empire from 726 to 842 AD. While the enthusiasm for iconoclasm varies among faiths, the practice is more common in religions which oppose idolatry, such as the Abrahamic religions. Outside of the religious context, iconoclasm can refer to movements for widespread destruction in symbols of an ideology or cause, such as the destruction of monarchist symbols during the French Revolution.

== Early religious iconoclasm ==
=== Ancient era ===
In the Bronze Age, the most significant episode of iconoclasm occurred in Egypt during the Amarna Period, when Akhenaten, based in his new capital of Akhetaten, instituted a significant shift in Egyptian artistic styles alongside a campaign of intolerance towards the traditional gods and a new emphasis on a state monolatristic tradition focused on the god Aten, the Sun disk—many temples and monuments were destroyed as a result:

In rebellion against the old religion and the powerful priests of Amun, Akhenaten ordered the eradication of all of Egypt's traditional gods. He sent royal officials to chisel out and destroy every reference to Amun and the names of other deities on tombs, temple walls, and cartouches to instill in the people that the Aten was the one true god.

Public references to Akhenaten were destroyed soon after his death. Comparing the ancient Egyptians with the Israelites, Jan Assmann writes:

For Egypt, the greatest horror was the destruction or abduction of the cult images. In the eyes of the Israelites, the erection of images meant the destruction of divine presence; in the eyes of the Egyptians, this same effect was attained by the destruction of images. In Egypt, iconoclasm was the most terrible religious crime; in Israel, the most terrible religious crime was idolatry. In this respect Osarseph alias Akhenaten, the iconoclast, and the Golden Calf, the paragon of idolatry, correspond to each other inversely, and it is strange that Aaron could so easily avoid the role of the religious criminal. It is more than probable that these traditions evolved under mutual influence. In this respect, Moses and Akhenaten became, after all, closely related.

=== Judaism ===
According to the Hebrew Bible, God instructed the Israelites to "destroy all [the] engraved stones, destroy all [the] molded images, and demolish all [the] high places" of the Canaanites as soon as they entered the Promised Land.

King Hezekiah purged Solomon's Temple in Jerusalem and all figures were also destroyed in the Land of Israel, including the Nehushtan, as recorded in the Second Book of Kings. His reforms were reversed in the reign of his son Manasseh.

== Iconoclasm in Christian history ==
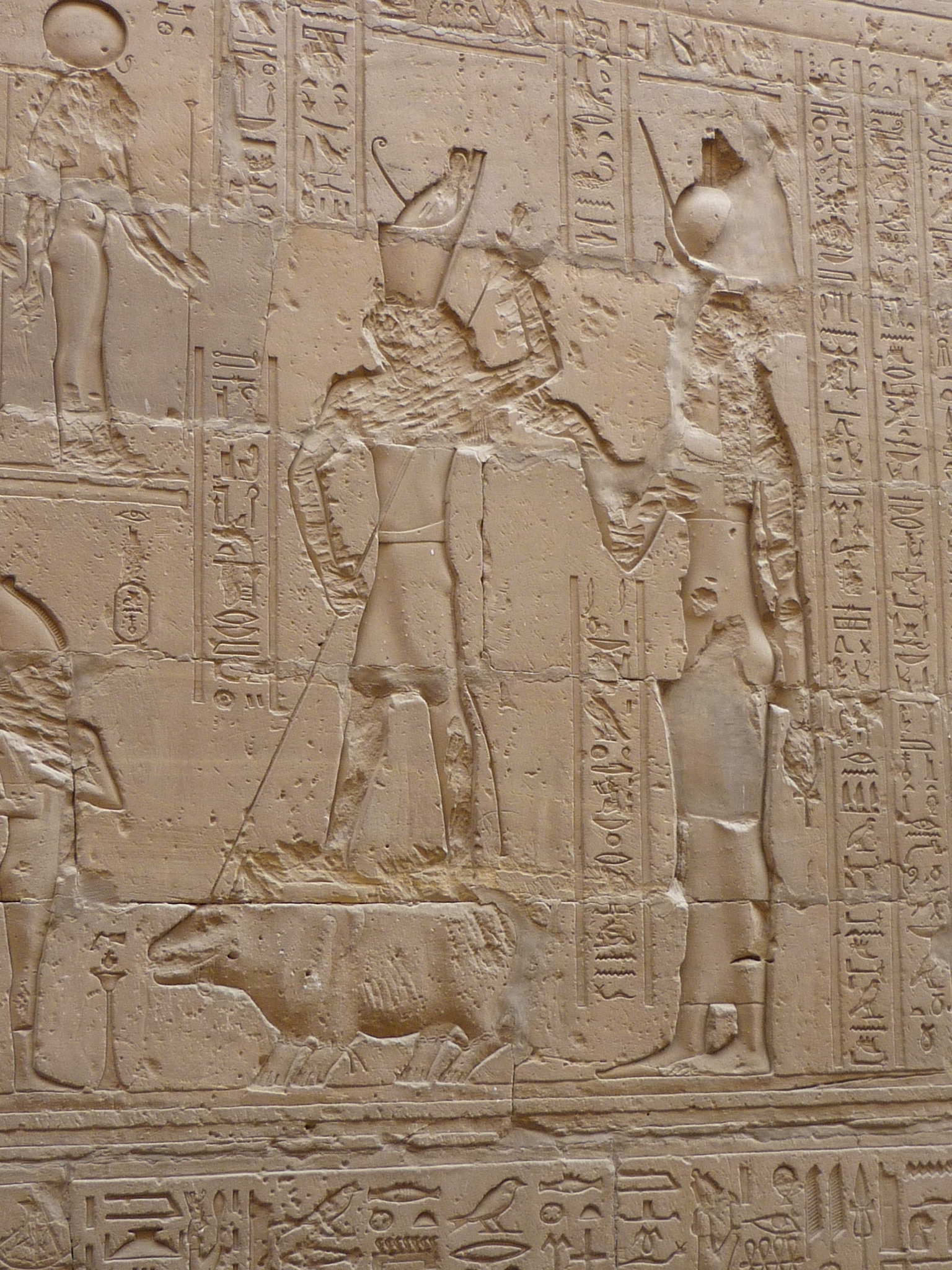
Defaced relief of Horus and Isis in the Temple of Edfu, Egypt. Local Christians engaged in campaigns of proselytism and iconoclasm.

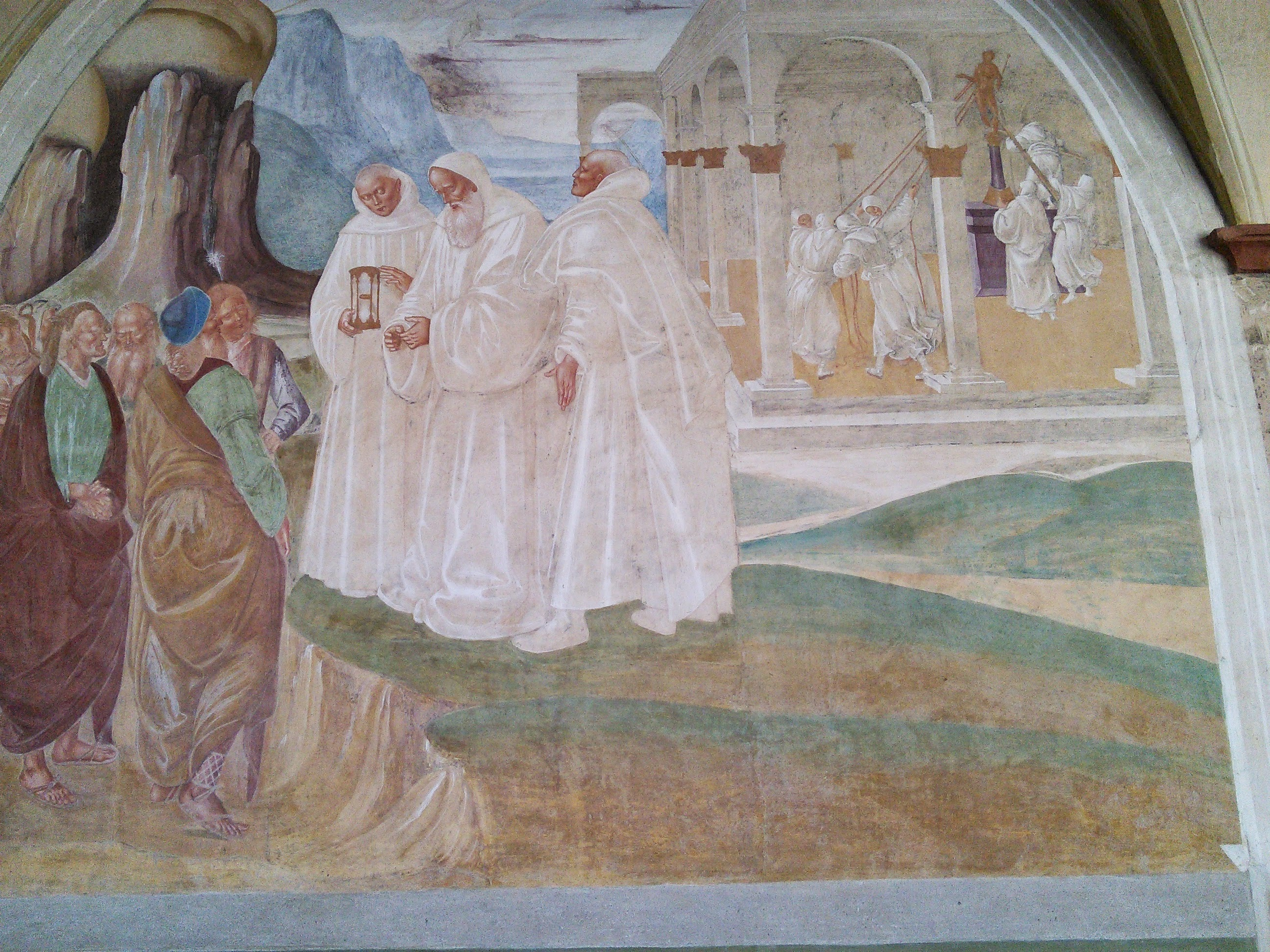
Saint Benedict's monks destroy an image of Apollo, worshiped in the Roman Empire.

Periods of aniconism have characterized various points of Christian history; early Christianity was largely aniconic, with Church Fathers Tertullian and Clement of Alexandria regarding the Ten Commandments to be binding on Christians. Early Christian apologists argued that God was beyond representation "and insisted that material things, unlike divine beings, were subject to disintegration, rust and decay." Marcus Minucius Felix stated that Christians lacked images "because Christians believe in and worship an invisible God." Aniconism was notable during the controversy of the Byzantine iconoclasm of the eighth century, and in the 16th century, when Calvinism rejected all images in churches, and this practice continues today in conservative Reformed (Calvinist) churches, as well as in Anabaptist Christianity. The Catholic Church and the Lutheran Church defend the use of sacred images in churches, shrines, and homes.

Scattered expressions of opposition to the use of images have been reported: the Synod of Elvira appeared to endorse iconoclasm; Canon 36 states: "Pictures are not to be placed in churches, so that they do not become objects of worship and adoration." A possible translation is also: "There shall be no pictures in the church, lest what is worshipped and adored should be depicted on the walls." The date of this canon is disputed. Proscription ceased after the destruction of pagan temples. However, widespread use of Christian iconography only began as Christianity increasingly spread among Gentiles after the legalization of Christianity by Roman Emperor Constantine (c. 312 AD). During the process of Christianisation under Constantine, Christian groups destroyed the images and sculptures of the Roman Empire's polytheist state religion.

Among early church theologians, iconoclastic tendencies were supported by theologians such as Tertullian, Clement of Alexandria, Origen, Lactantius, Justin Martyr, Eusebius and Epiphanius.

=== Byzantine era ===
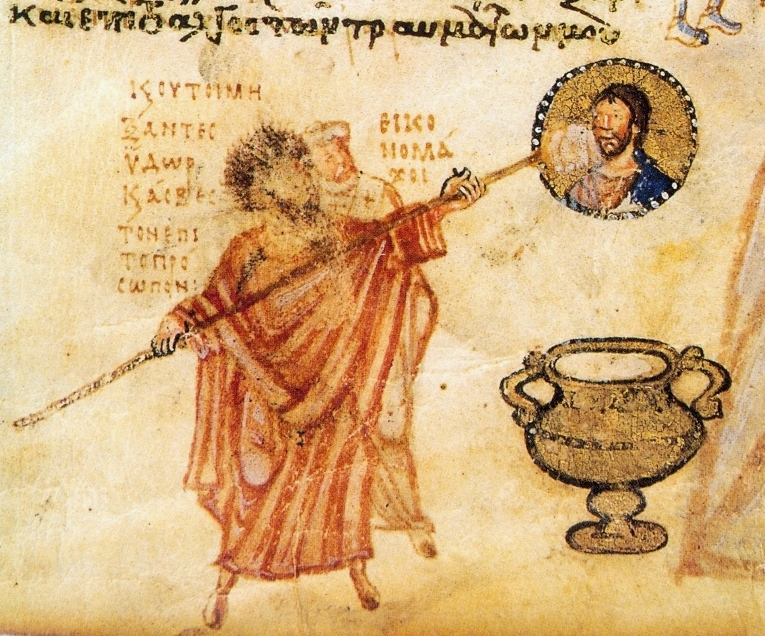
Byzantine Iconoclasm, Chludov Psalter, 9th century

The period after the reign of Byzantine Emperor Justinian (527–565) evidently saw a huge increase in the use of images, both in volume and quality, and a gathering aniconic reaction.

One notable change within the Byzantine Empire came in 695, when Justinian II's government added a full-face image of Christ on the obverse of imperial gold coins. The change caused the Caliph Abd al-Malik to stop his earlier adoption of Byzantine coin types. He started a purely Islamic coinage with lettering only. A letter by the Patriarch Germanus, written before 726 to two iconoclast bishops, says that "now whole towns and multitudes of people are in considerable agitation over this matter", but there is little written evidence of the debate.

Government-led iconoclasm began with Byzantine Emperor Leo III, who issued a series of edicts between 726 and 730 against the veneration of images. The religious conflict created political and economic divisions in Byzantine society; iconoclasm was generally supported by the Eastern, poorer, non-Greek peoples of the Empire who had to frequently deal with raids from the new Muslim Empire. On the other hand, the wealthier Greeks of Constantinople and the peoples of the Balkan and Italian provinces strongly opposed iconoclasm.

=== Pre-Reformation ===
Peter of Bruys opposed the usage of religious images, the Strigolniki were also possibly iconoclastic. Claudius of Turin was the bishop of Turin from 817 until his death. He is most noted for teaching iconoclasm.

=== Reformation era ===
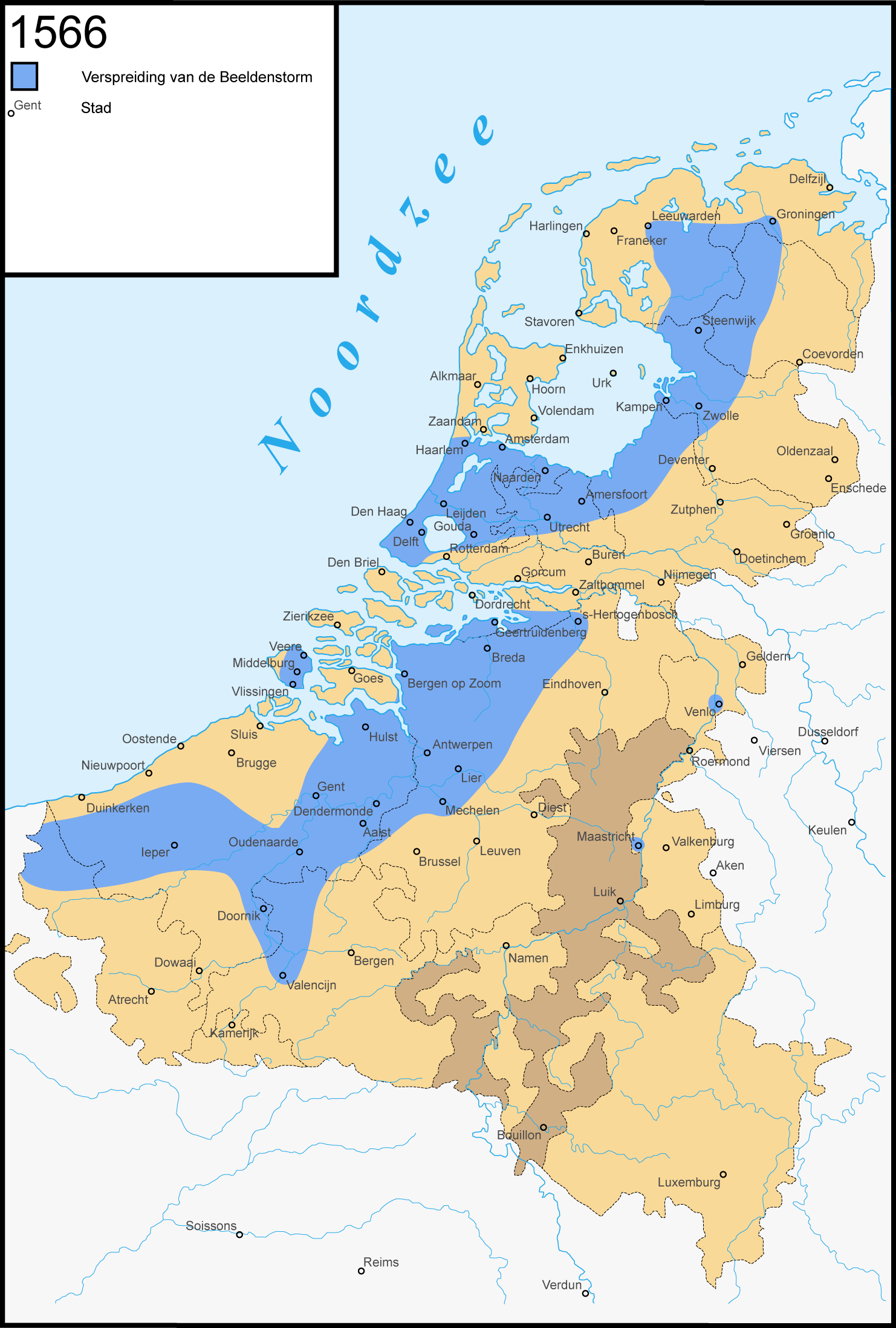
Extent (in blue) of the Beeldenstorm through the Spanish Netherlands

The first iconoclastic wave happened in Wittenberg in the early 1520s under reformers Thomas Müntzer and Andreas Karlstadt. In 1522 Karlstadt published his tract, "Von abtuhung der Bylder". ("On the removal of images"), which added to the growing unrest in Wittenberg. Martin Luther, then concealed under the pen-name of 'Junker Jörg', intervened to calm things down. Luther argued that the mental picturing of Christ when reading the Scriptures was similar in character to artistic renderings of Christ.

In contrast to the Lutherans who favoured certain types of sacred art in their churches and homes, the Reformed (Calvinist) leaders, in particular Karlstadt, Huldrych Zwingli and John Calvin, encouraged the removal of religious images by invoking the Decalogue's prohibition of idolatry and the manufacture of graven (sculpted) images of God. As a result, individuals attacked statues and images, most famously in the beeldenstorm across the Low Countries in 1566.

The belief of iconoclasm caused havoc throughout Europe. In 1523, specifically due to the Swiss reformer Zwingli, a vast number of his followers viewed themselves as being involved in a spiritual community that in matters of faith should obey neither the visible Church nor lay authorities. According to Peter George Wallace, "Zwingli's attack on images, at the first debate, triggered iconoclastic incidents in Zürich and the villages under civic jurisdiction that the reformer was unwilling to condone." Due to this action of protest against authority, "Zwingli responded with a carefully reasoned treatise that men could not live in society without laws and constraint".

Significant iconoclastic riots took place in Basel (in 1529), Zürich (1523), Copenhagen (1530), Münster (1534), Geneva (1535), Augsburg (1537), Scotland (1559), Rouen (1560), and Saintes and La Rochelle (1562). Calvinist iconoclasm in Europe "provoked reactive riots by Lutheran mobs" in Germany and "antagonized the neighbouring Eastern Orthodox" in the Baltic region.

The Seventeen Provinces (now the Netherlands, Belgium, and parts of Northern France) were disrupted by widespread Calvinist iconoclasm in the summer of 1566.

Calvinist iconoclasm during the Reformation

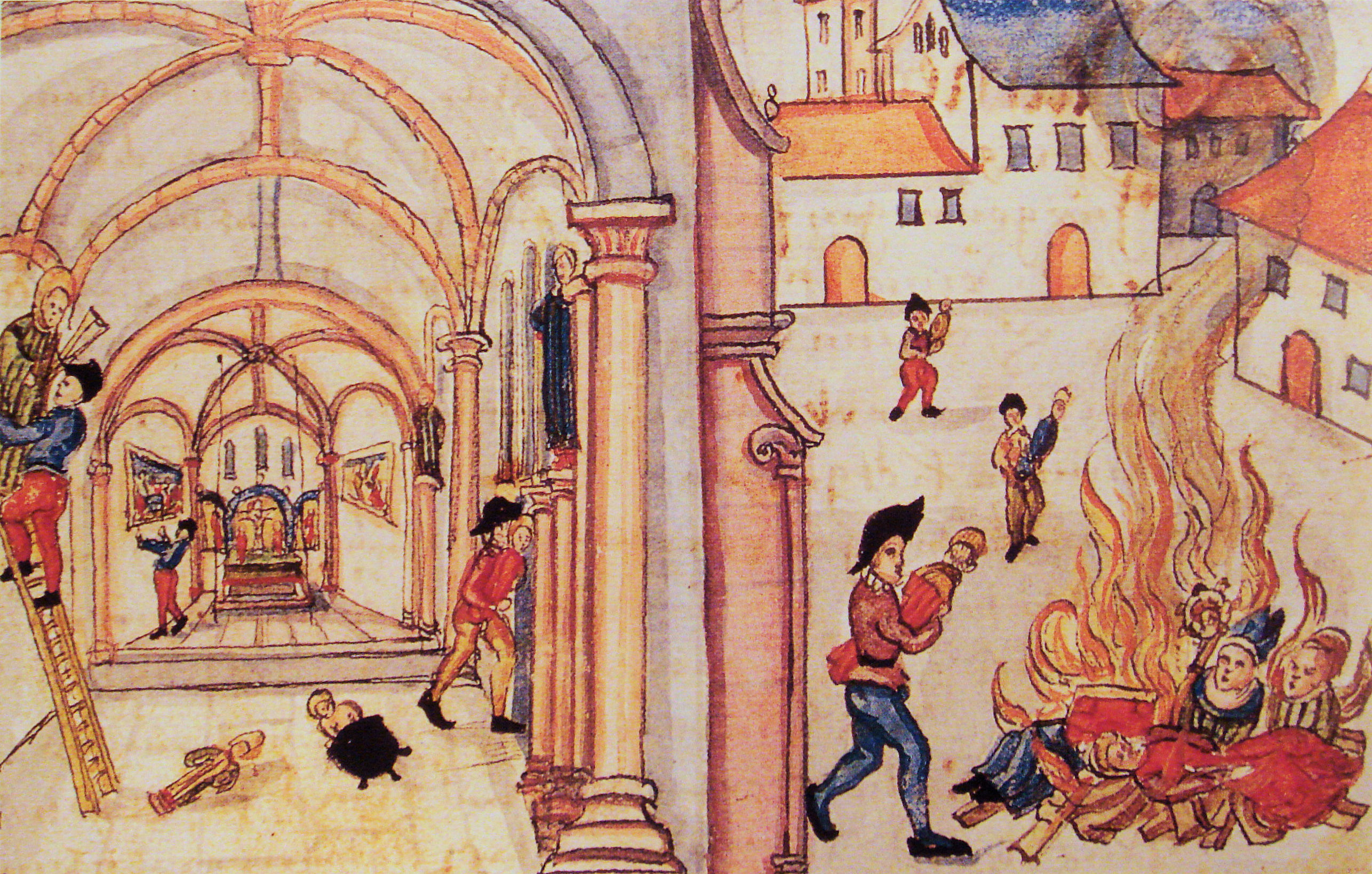
Destruction of religious images by the Reformed in Zürich, Switzerland, 1524

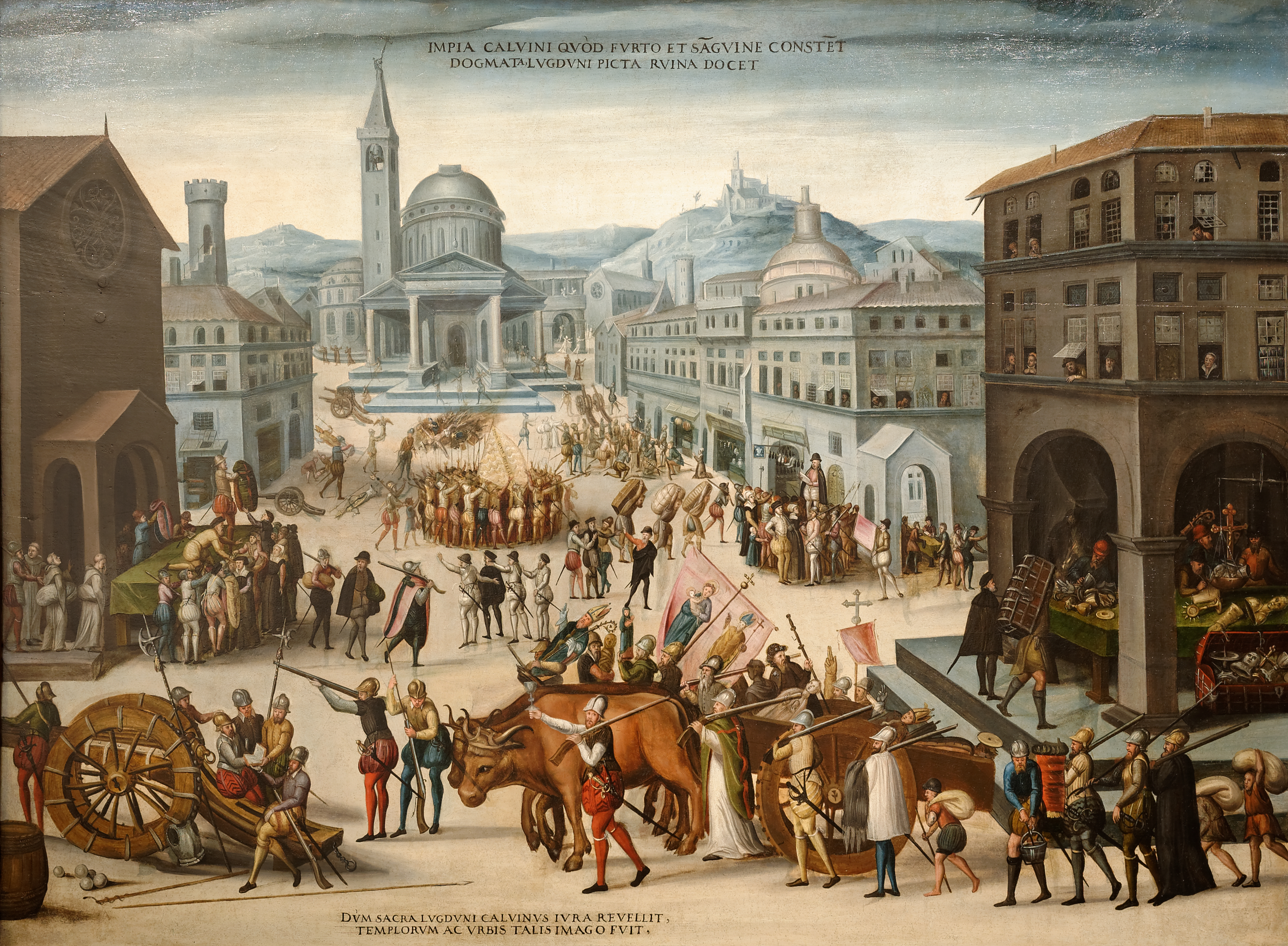
Looting of the Churches of Lyon by the Calvinists in 1562 by Antoine Caron

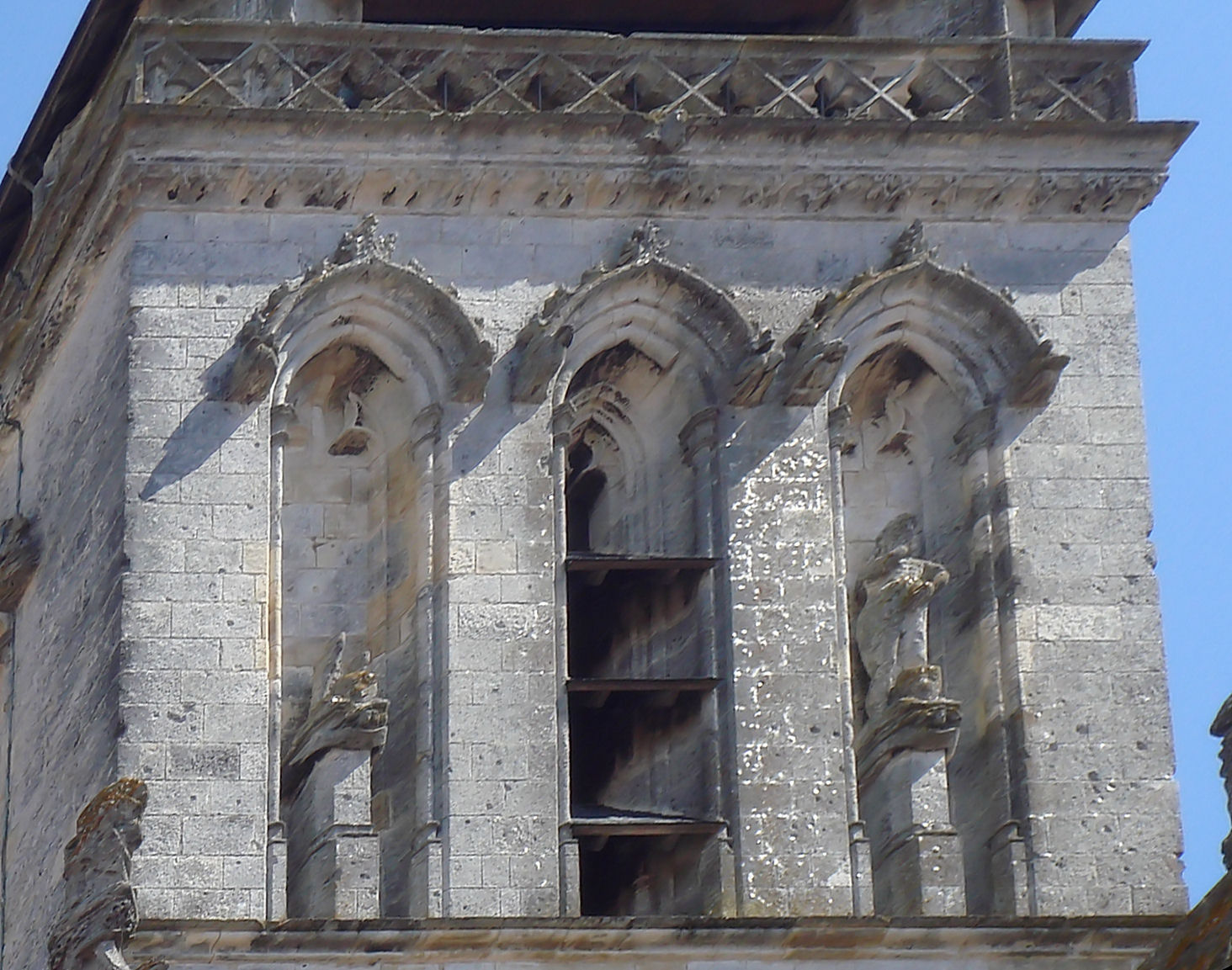
Remains of Calvinist iconoclasm, Clocher Saint-Barthélémy, La Rochelle, France

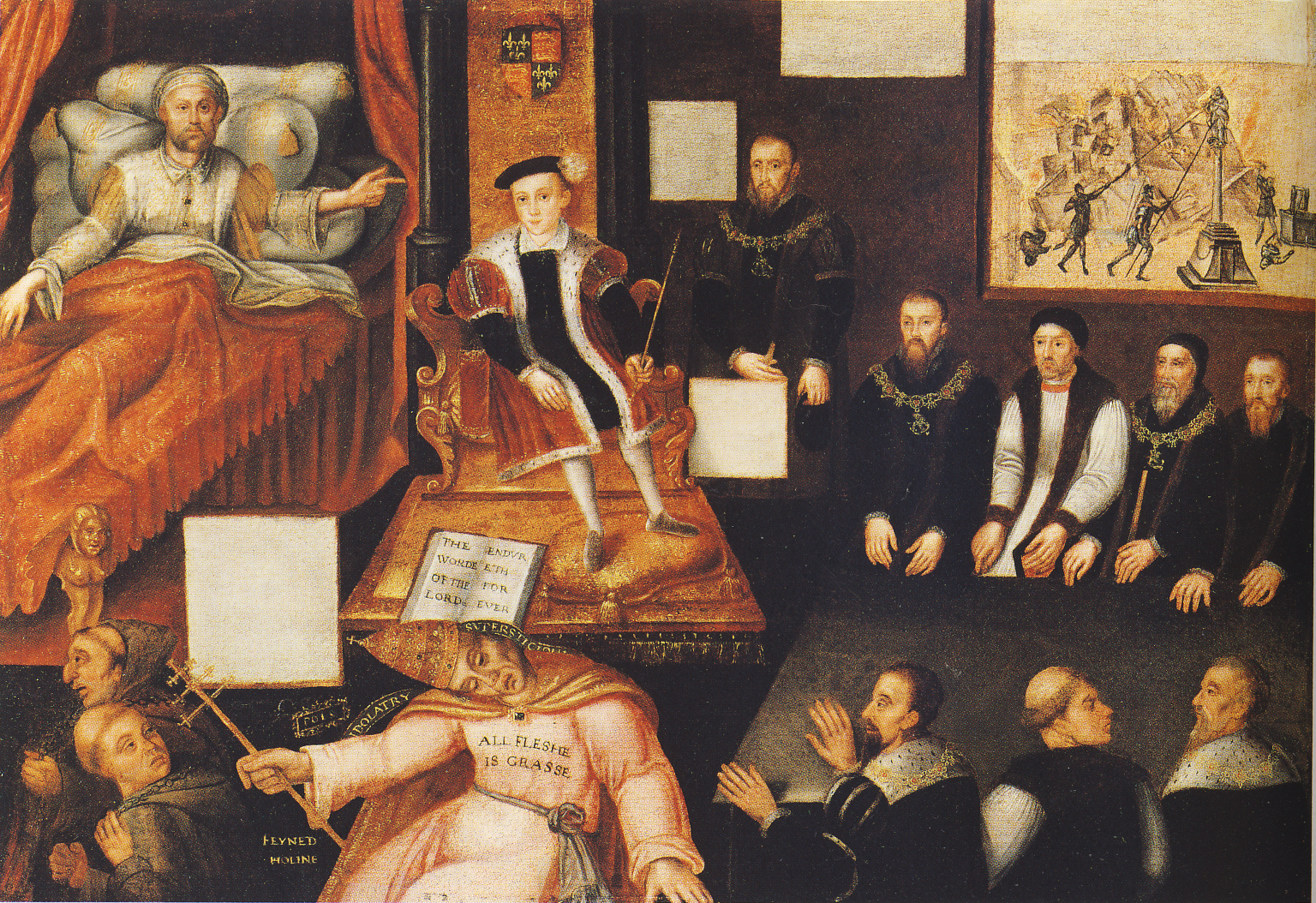
In this Elizabethan work of propaganda, the top right depicts men pulling down and smashing icons, while power is shifting from the dying King Henry VIII at left, pointing to his staunchly Protestant son, the boy-king Edward VI at centre.

During the Reformation in England, which started during the reign of Henry VIII, and was urged on by reformers such as Hugh Latimer and Thomas Cranmer, limited official action was taken against religious images in churches in the late 1530s. Henry's young son, Edward VI, came to the throne in 1547 and, under Cranmer's guidance, issued injunctions for religious reforms in the same year and in 1549 the Putting away of Books and Images Act.

During the English Civil War, the Parliamentarians reorganised the administration of East Anglia into the Eastern Association of counties. This covered some of the wealthiest counties in England, which in turn financed a substantial and significant military force. After Earl of Manchester was appointed the commanding officer of these forces, in turn he appointed Smasher Dowsing as Provost Marshal, with a warrant to demolish religious images which were considered to be superstitious or linked with popism. Bishop Joseph Hall of Norwich described the events of 1643 when troops and citizens, encouraged by a Parliamentary ordinance against superstition and idolatry, behaved thus:

Lord what work was here! What clattering of glasses! What beating down of walls! What tearing up of monuments! What pulling down of seats! What wresting out of irons and brass from the windows! What defacing of arms! What demolishing of curious stonework! What tooting and piping upon organ pipes! And what a hideous triumph in the market-place before all the country, when all the mangled organ pipes, vestments, both copes and surplices, together with the leaden cross which had newly been sawn down from the Green-yard pulpit and the service-books and singing books that could be carried to the fire in the public market-place were heaped together.

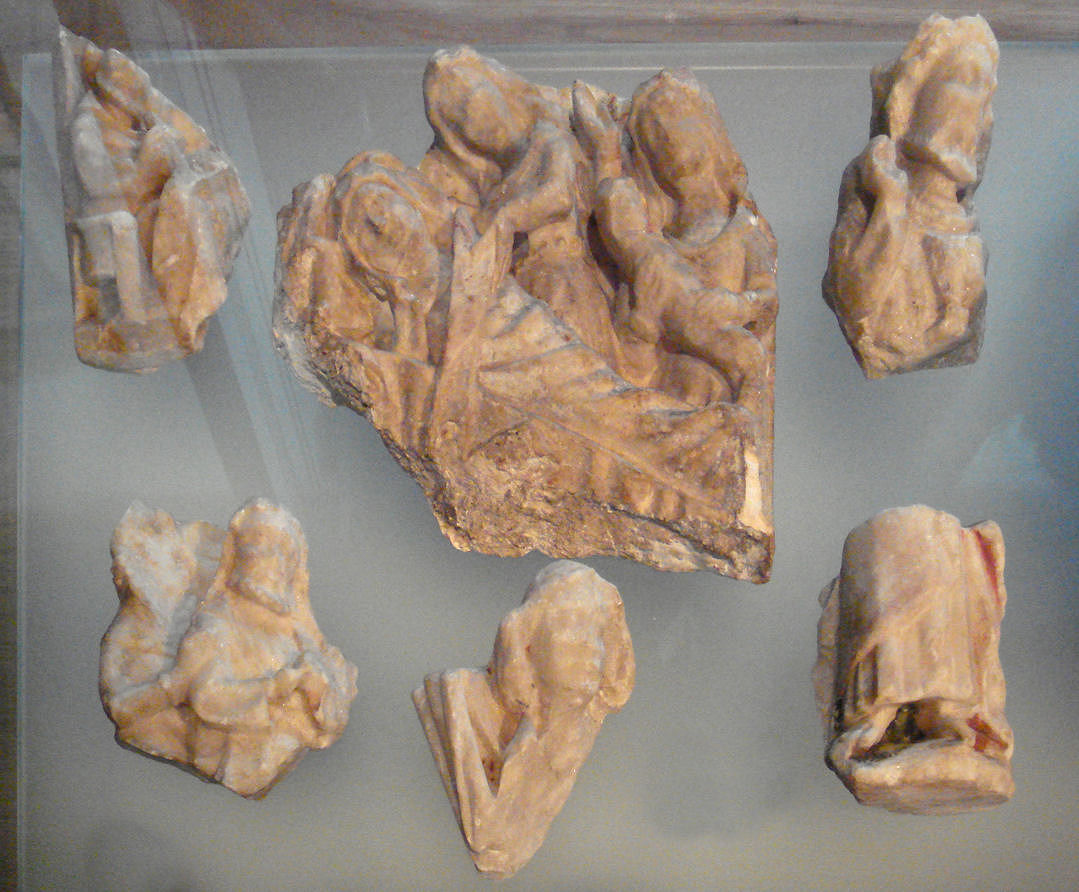
Altarpiece fragments (late 1300 – early 1400) destroyed during the English dissolution of the monasteries, mid-16th century

Protestant Christianity was not uniformly hostile to the use of religious images. Martin Luther taught the "importance of images as tools for instruction and aids to devotion", stating: "If it is not a sin but good to have the image of Christ in my heart, why should it be a sin to have it in my eyes?" Lutheran churches retained ornate church interiors with a prominent crucifix, reflecting their high view of the real presence of Christ in Eucharist. As such, "Lutheran worship became a complex ritual choreography set in a richly furnished church interior." For Lutherans, "the Reformation renewed rather than removed the religious image".

Lutheran scholar Jeremiah Ohl writes:

Zwingli and others for the sake of saving the Word rejected all plastic art; Luther, with an equal concern for the Word, but far more conservative, would have all the arts to be the servants of the Gospel. "I am not of the opinion" said [Luther], "that through the Gospel all the arts should be banished and driven away, as some zealots want to make us believe; but I wish to see them all, especially music, in the service of Him Who gave and created them." Again he says: "I have myself heard those who oppose pictures, read from my German Bible.... But this contains many pictures of God, of the angels, of men, and of animals, especially in the Revelation of St. John, in the books of Moses, and in the book of Joshua. We therefore kindly beg these fanatics to permit us also to paint these pictures on the wall that they may be remembered and better understood, inasmuch as they can harm as little on the walls as in books. Would to God that I could persuade those who can afford it to paint the whole Bible on their houses, inside and outside, so that all might see; this would indeed be a Christian work. For I am convinced that it is God's will that we should hear and learn what He has done, especially what Christ suffered. But when I hear these things and meditate upon them, I find it impossible not to picture them in my heart. Whether I want to or not, when I hear, of Christ, a human form hanging upon a cross rises up in my heart: just as I see my natural face reflected when I look into water. Now if it is not sinful for me to have Christ's picture in my heart, why should it be sinful to have it before my eyes?

The Ottoman Sultan Suleiman the Magnificent, who had pragmatic reasons to support the Dutch Revolt (the rebels, like himself, were fighting against Spain) also completely approved of their act of "destroying idols", which accorded well with Muslim teachings.

16th century Protestant iconoclasm had various effects on visual arts: it encouraged the development of art with violent images such as martyrdoms, of pieces whose subject was the dangers of idolatry, or art stripped of objects with overt Catholic symbolism: the still life, landscape and genre paintings.

=== Other instances ===
In Japan during the early modern age, the spread of Catholicism also involved the repulsion of non-Christian religious structures, including Buddhist temples and Shinto shrines and figures. At times of conflict with rivals or some time after the conversion of several daimyos, Christian converts would often destroy Buddhist and Shinto religious structures.

Many of the moai of Easter Island were toppled during the 18th century in the iconoclasm of civil wars before any European encounter. Other instances of iconoclasm may have occurred throughout Eastern Polynesia during its conversion to Christianity in the 19th century.

After the Second Vatican Council in the late 20th century, some Roman Catholic parish churches discarded much of their traditional imagery and art which critics call iconoclasm.

== Muslim iconoclasm ==
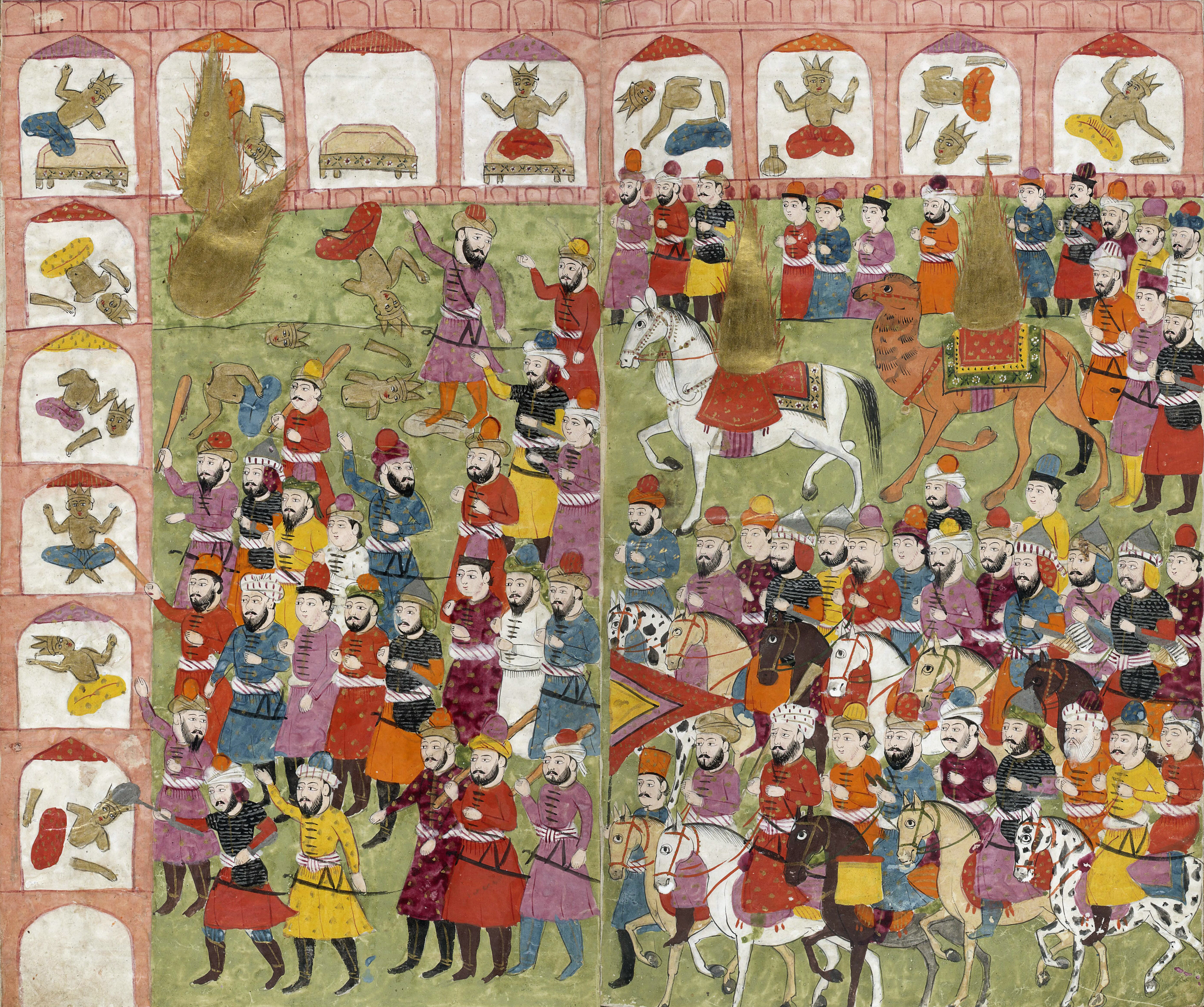
Islamic miniature depicting Muhammad and Ali (represented by golden flames) leading the Muslims in their destruction of Meccan idols

Islam has a strong tradition of forbidding the depiction of figures, especially religious figures, with some Sunnis forbidding it entirely. In the history of Islam, the act of removing idols from the Ka'ba in Mecca has great symbolic and historic importance for all believers.

In general, Muslim societies have avoided the depiction of living beings (both animals and humans) within such sacred spaces as mosques and madrasahs. This ban on figural representation is not based on the Qur'an, instead, it is based on traditions which are described within the Hadith. The prohibition of figuration has not always been extended to the secular sphere, and a robust tradition of figural representation exists within Muslim art. However, Western authors have tended to perceive "a long, culturally determined, and unchanging tradition of violent iconoclastic acts" within Islamic society.

=== Early Islam in Arabia ===
The first act of Muslim iconoclasm dates to the beginning of Islam, in 630, when the various statues of Arabian deities housed in the Kaaba in Mecca were destroyed. There is a tradition that Muhammad spared a fresco of Mary and Jesus. This act was intended to bring an end to the idolatry which, in the Muslim view, characterized Jahiliyyah.

The destruction of the idols of Mecca did not, however, determine the treatment of other religious communities living under Muslim rule after the expansion of the caliphate. Most Christians under Muslim rule, for example, continued to produce icons and to decorate their churches as they wished. A major exception to this pattern of tolerance in early Islamic history was the "Edict of Yazīd", issued by the Umayyad caliph Yazīd II in 722–723. This edict ordered the destruction of crosses and Christian images within the territory of the caliphate. Researchers have discovered evidence that the order was followed, particularly in present-day Jordan, where archaeological evidence shows the removal of images from the mosaic floors of some, although not all, of the churches that stood at this time. But Yazīd's iconoclastic policies were not continued by his successors, and Christian communities of the Levant continued to make icons without significant interruption from the sixth century to the ninth.

=== Egypt ===
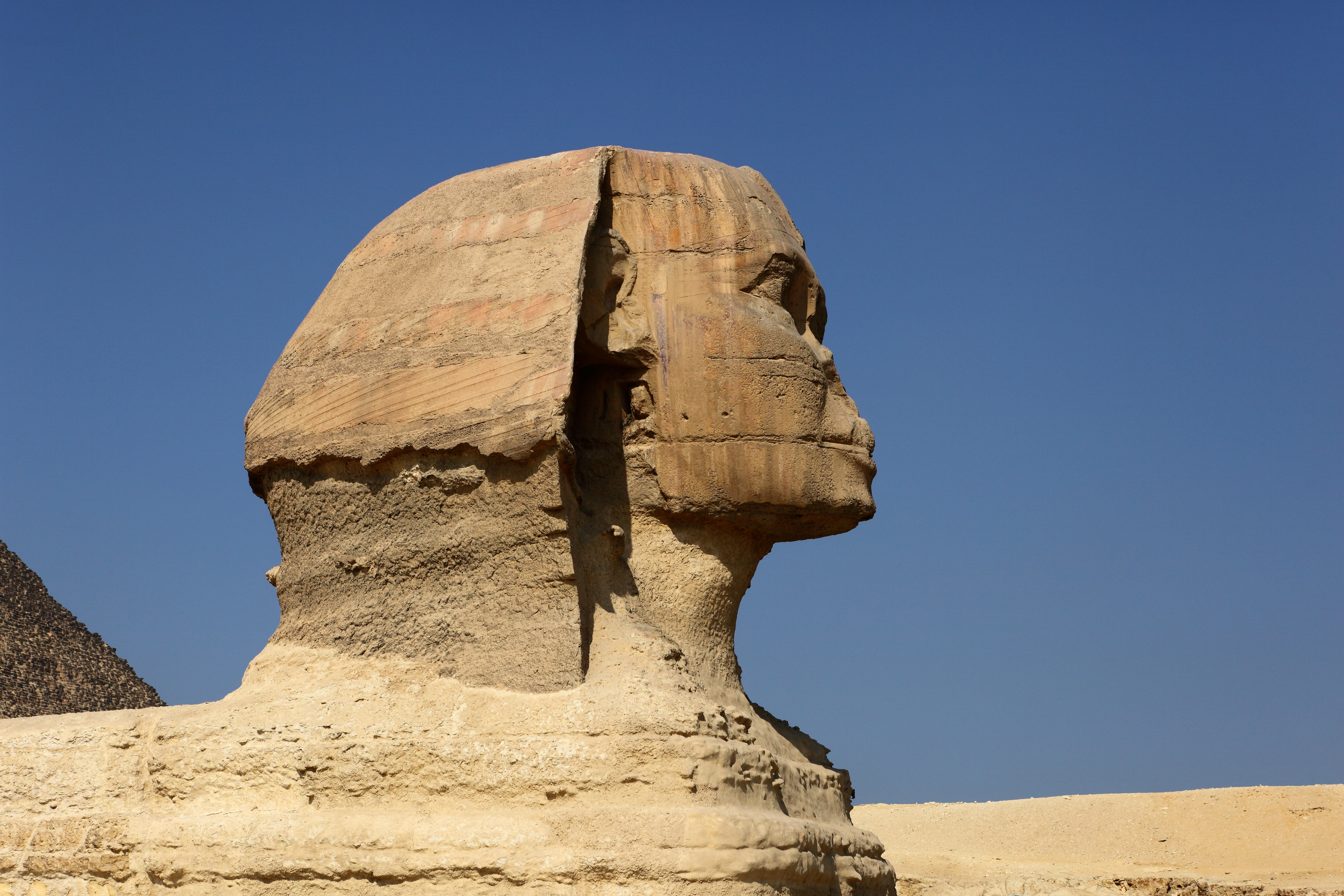
The Great Sphinx of Giza's profile in 2010, without its nose

Al-Maqrīzī, writing in the 15th century, attributes the missing nose on the Great Sphinx of Giza to iconoclasm by Muhammad Sa'im al-Dahr, a Sufi Muslim in the mid-1300s. He was reportedly outraged by local Muslims making offerings to the Great Sphinx in the hope of controlling the flood cycle, and he was later executed for vandalism. However, whether this was actually the cause of the missing nose has been debated by historians. Mark Lehner, having performed an archaeological study, concluded that it was broken with instruments at an earlier unknown time between the 3rd and 10th centuries.

=== Ottoman conquests ===
Certain conquering Muslim armies have used local temples or houses of worship as mosques. An example is Hagia Sophia in Istanbul (formerly Constantinople), which was converted into a mosque in 1453. Most icons were desecrated and the rest were covered with plaster. In 1934 the government of Turkey decided to convert the Hagia Sophia into a museum and the restoration of the mosaics was undertaken by the American Byzantine Institute beginning in 1932.

=== Contemporary events ===
Certain Muslim denominations continue to pursue iconoclastic agendas. There has been much controversy within Islam over the recent and apparently on-going destruction of historic sites by Saudi Arabian authorities, prompted by the fear they could become the subject of "idolatry".

In 2001, the giant Buddhas of Bamyan were destroyed by the then-Taliban government of Afghanistan. The act generated worldwide protests and was not supported by other Muslim governments and organizations. It was widely perceived in the Western media as a result of the Muslim prohibition against figural decoration. Such an account overlooks "the coexistence between the Buddhas and the Muslim population that marveled at them for over a millennium" before their destruction. According to art historian F. B. Flood, analysis of the Taliban's statements regarding the Buddhas suggest that their destruction was motivated more by political than by theological concerns. Taliban spokesmen have given many different explanations of the motives for the destruction.

During the Tuareg rebellion of 2012, the radical Islamist militia Ansar Dine destroyed various Sufi shrines from the 15th and 16th centuries in the city of Timbuktu, Mali. In 2016, the International Criminal Court (ICC) sentenced Ahmad al-Faqi al-Mahdi, a former member of Ansar Dine, to nine years in prison for this destruction of cultural world heritage. This was the first time that the ICC convicted a person for such a crime.

The Islamic State of Iraq and the Levant carried out iconoclastic attacks such as the destruction of Shia mosques and shrines. Notable incidents include blowing up the Mosque of the Prophet Yunus (Jonah) and destroying the Shrine to Seth in Mosul.

== Iconoclasm in the Indian subcontinent ==
=== By Hindus ===
Eaton Richard claims that in early Medieval India, there were numerous recorded instances of temple desecration by Indian kings against rival Indian kingdoms, which involved conflicts between devotees of different Hindu deities, as well as conflicts between Hindus, Buddhists, and Jains. Parmar ruler Subhat Barman, Shriharsha of Kashmir, Rajendra Chola, Shashanka of Gauda, Pushyamitra Shunga, Pallava monarch Mahendra Barman and Chalukya monarch Pulakeshin II had destroyed Jain and Buddhist temples.

The Alchon Huns caused severe damage to Buddhist religion. Buddhist sources record Mihirakula as a 'terrible persecutor of their religion' in Gandhara. During his reign, over 1,000 Buddhist monasteries across Gandhara were destroyed, coinciding with the extinction of the region's distinctive Greco-Buddhist art. Xuanzang noted drastic decline in Buddhism during his visit of India in 630 CE. He wrote that most monasteries in Gandhara lay deserted and in ruins following the earlier destructions ordered by Mihirakula. The Hindu and Buddhist communities between 6th to 12th centuries living in eastern India had engaged in intense conflicts. Buddhist monasteries and Viharas had been converted into Hindu temples. In 2015, an archeological team by Jahangirnagar University discovered Hindu temples on 13 demolished Stupas dating back to the Pala period (between 8th to the 11th century) in Dinajpur. Professor Swadhin Sen states destroyed Buddhist structures were converted to Hindu temples.

The destructions were not limited to a region or era. Historian Richard M. Eaton identified 80 instances of temple destruction whose historicity claims true figures are unknowable since many desecrations went unrecorded or their records did not survive. Some have criticised his historiography arguing that he understates the religious dimensions of these events.

==== Medieval period ====
In the 1460s, Kapilendra Deva sacked the Shaiva and Vaishnava temples in the Cauvery delta in the course of wars of conquest in the Tamil country. In 1514, Krishnadevaraya looted a Bala Krishna temple in Udayagiri. In 1520, he looted a Vitthala temple in Pandharpur. In the same year, Rana Sanga demolished a Mosque following the capture of Idar, further built a Hindu temple on the site.

==== Contemporary ====
On December 6, 1992, a large crowd of Hindu karsevaks (volunteers) entirely destroyed the 16th-century Babri mosque in Ayodhya, Uttar Pradesh, India, in an attempt to reclaim the land known as Ram Janmabhoomi. The demolition occurred after a religious ceremony turned violent and resulted in several months of intercommunal rioting between India's Hindu and Muslim communities, causing the death of at least 2,000 people most of which were Muslims after Muslims first burnt the train load of unarmed Hindus.

In April 2021, a Hindu extremist under the influence of the Hindu priest Yati Narsinghanand Saraswati destroyed an idol of Sai Baba at a temple in Delhi incorrectly labeling Sai Baba as a jihadist. The act was condemned by the Hindu and the Muslim community.

=== By Muslims ===
Records from the campaign recorded in the Chach Nama record the destruction of temples during the early 8th century when the Umayyad governor of Damascus, al-Hajjaj ibn Yusuf, mobilized an expedition of 6000 cavalry under Muhammad bin Qasim in 712.

Historian Upendra Thakur records the persecution of Hindus and Buddhists:

Muhammad triumphantly marched into the country, conquering Debal, Sehwan, Nerun, Brahmanadabad, Alor and Multan one after the other in quick succession, and in less than a year and a half, the far-flung Hindu kingdom was crushed ... There was a fearful outbreak of religious bigotry in several places and temples were wantonly desecrated. At Debal, the Nairun and Aror temples were demolished and converted into mosques.

Iconoclasm during the Muslim conquests in the Indian subcontinent

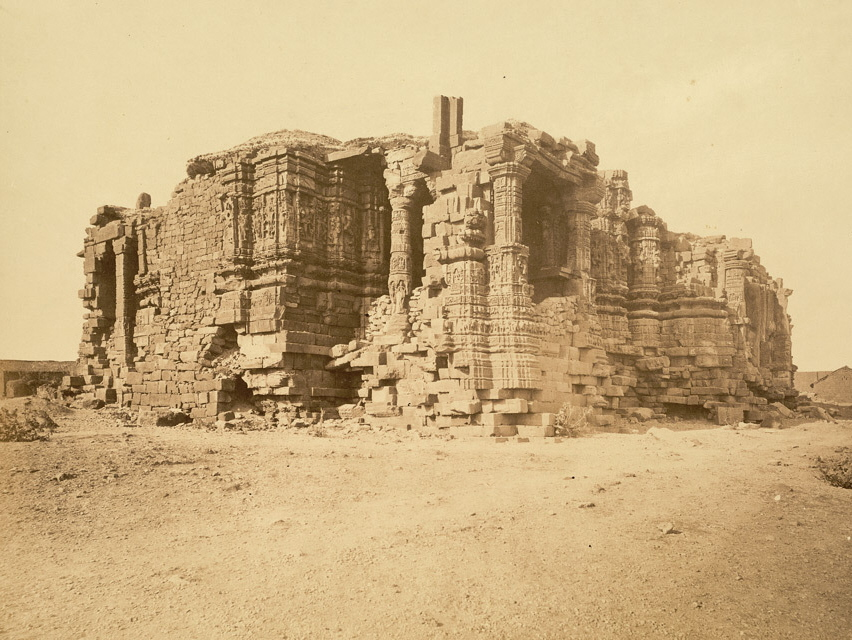
The Somnath Temple in Gujarat was repeatedly destroyed by Islamic armies and rebuilt by Hindus. It was destroyed by Delhi Sultanate's army in 1299 AD. The present temple was reconstructed in Chalukyan style of Hindu temple architecture and completed in May 1951.

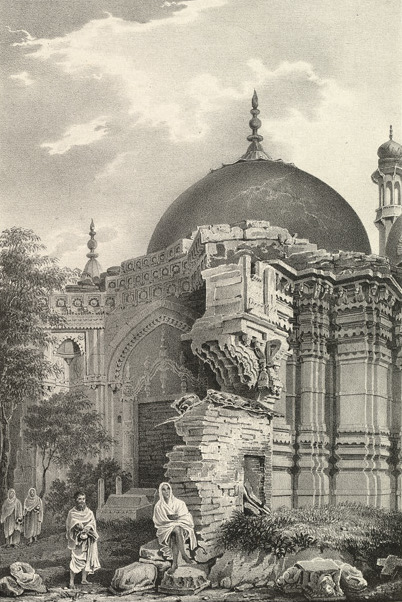
The Kashi Vishwanath Temple was repeatedly destroyed by Islamic invaders such as Qutb al-Din Aibak.

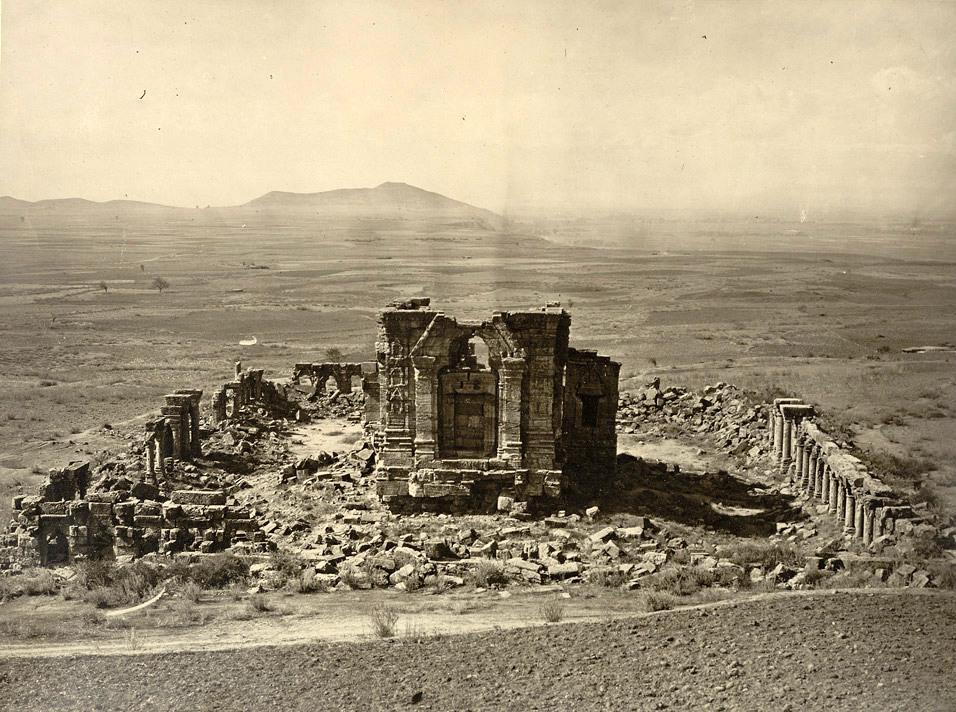
Ruins of the Martand Sun Temple. The temple was destroyed on the orders of Muslim Sultan Sikandar Butshikan in the early 15th century, with demolition lasting a year.

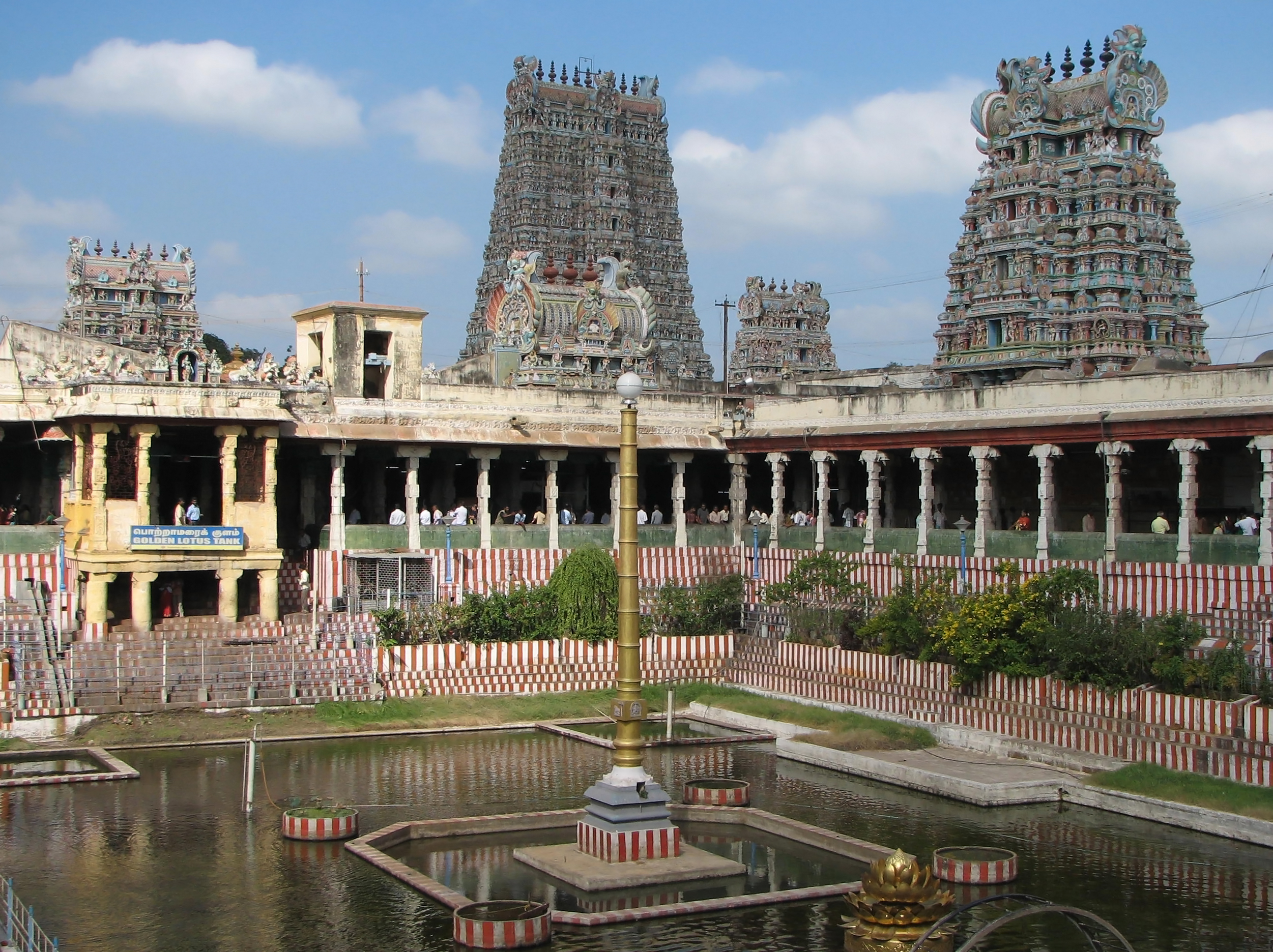
The armies of Delhi Sultanate led by Muslim Commander Malik Kafur plundered the Meenakshi Temple and looted it of its valuables.

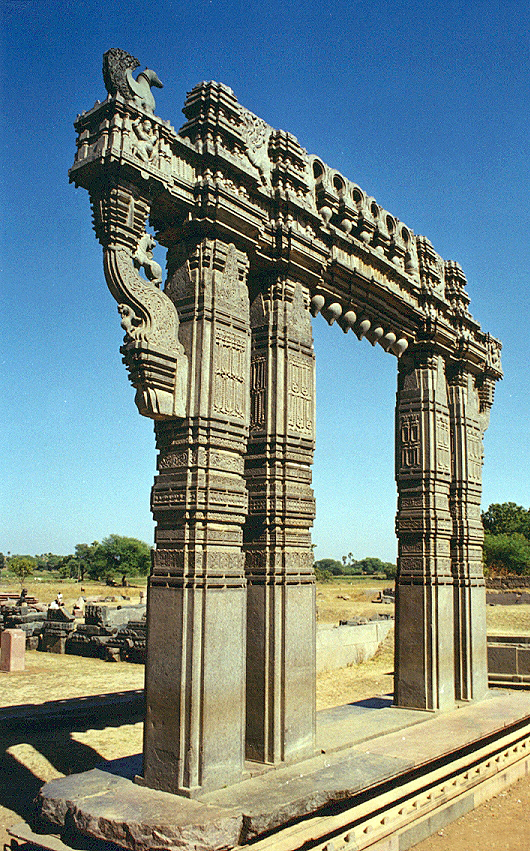
Kakatiya Kala Thoranam (Warangal Gate) built by the Kakatiya dynasty in ruins; one of the many temple complexes destroyed by the Delhi Sultanate.

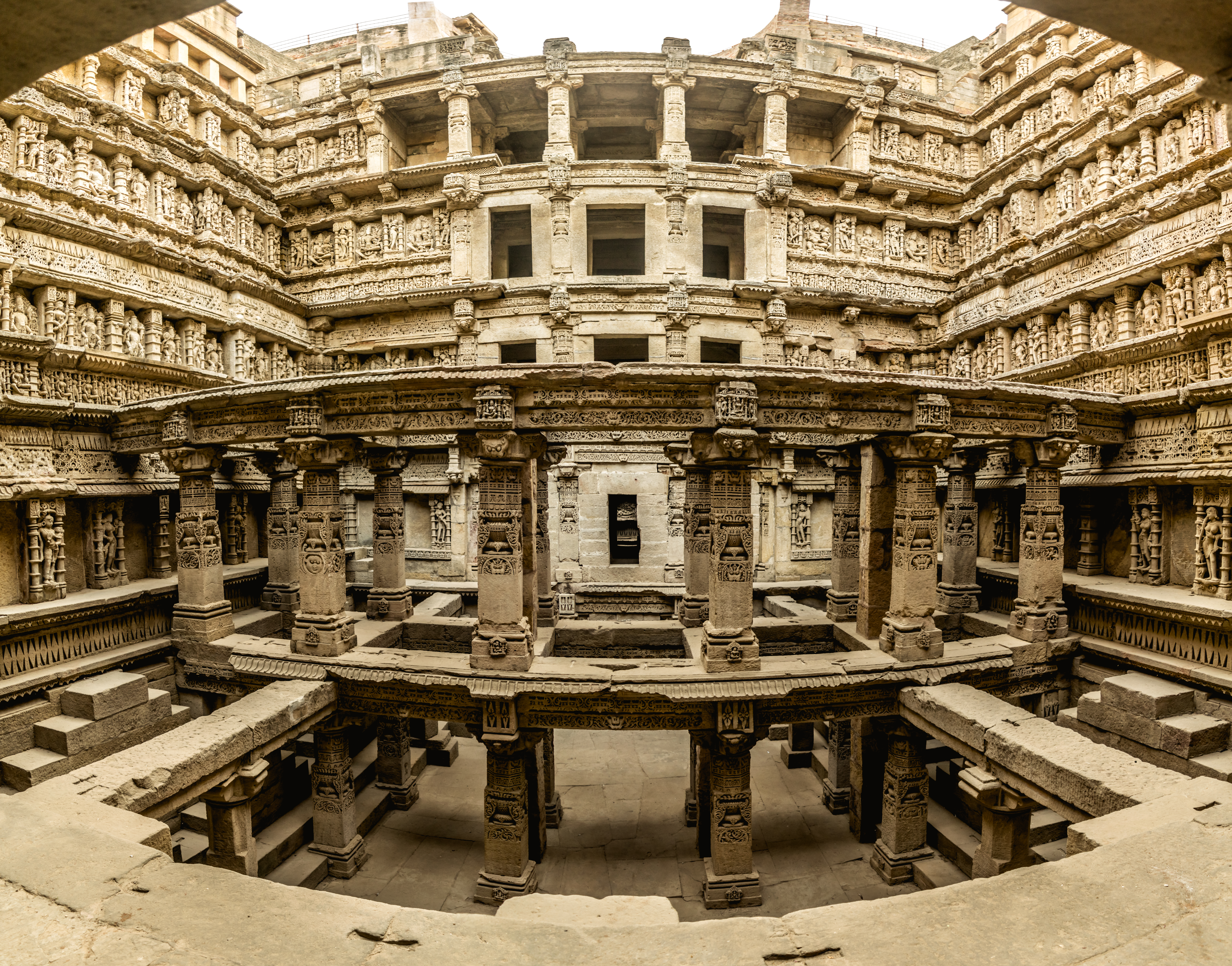
Rani Ki Vav is a stepwell, built by the Chaulukya dynasty, located in Patan; the city was sacked by Sultan of Delhi Qutb-ud-din Aybak between 1200 and 1210, and it was destroyed by the Allauddin Khilji in 1298.

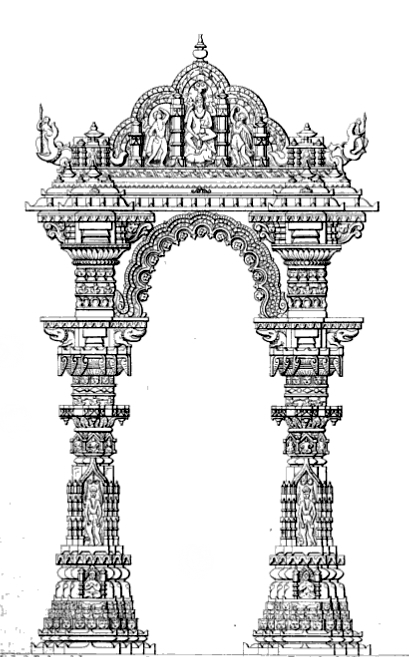
Artistic rendition of the Kirtistambh at Rudra Mahalaya Temple. The temple was destroyed by Alauddin Khalji.

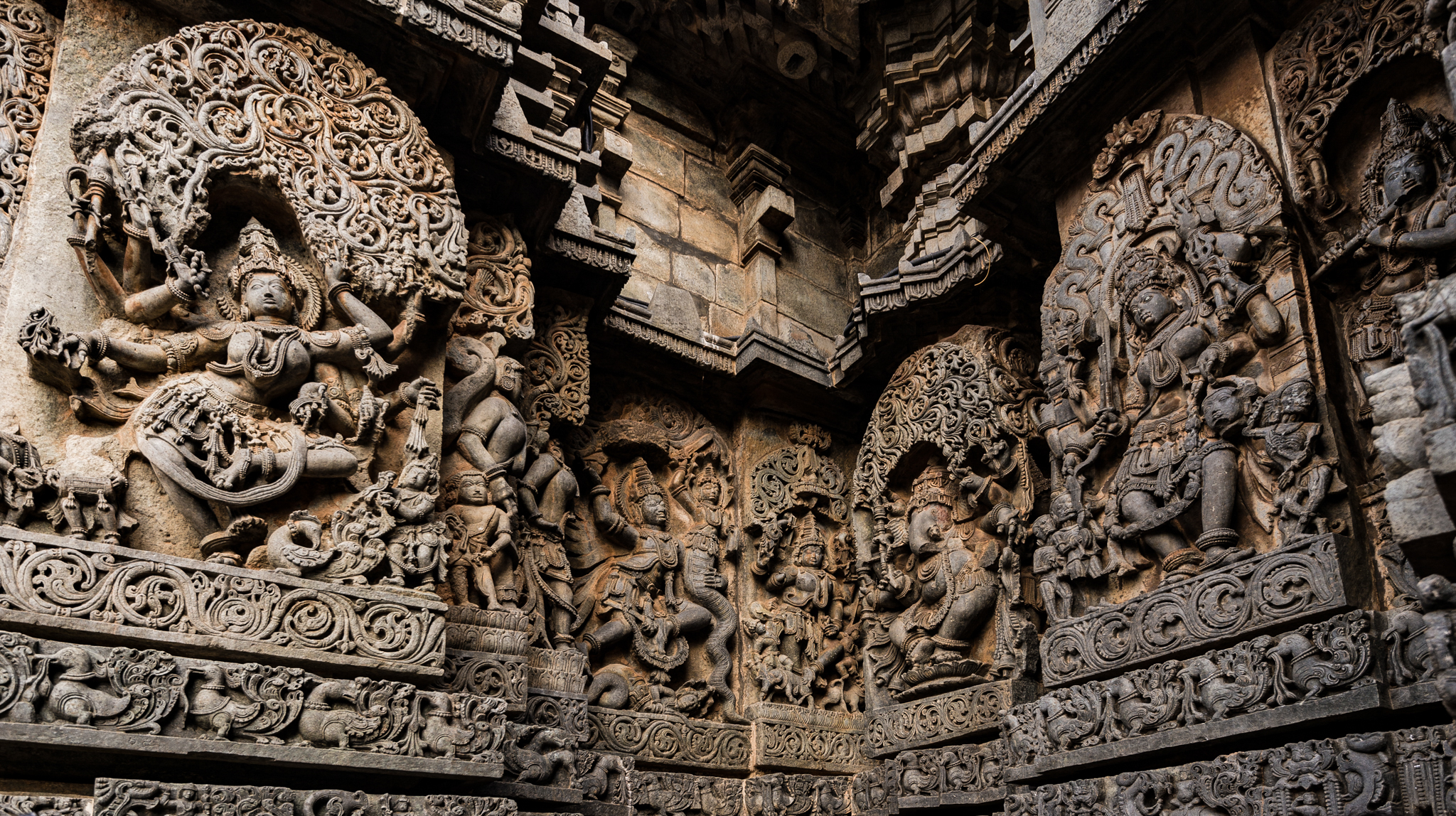
Exterior wall reliefs at Hoysaleswara Temple. The temple was twice sacked and plundered by the Delhi Sultanate.

==== The Somnath temple and Mahmud of Ghazni ====
In 1296 AD, the temple was once again destroyed by Sultan Allauddin Khilji's army. According to Taj-ul-Ma'sir of Hasan Nizami, Raja Karan of Gujarat was defeated and forced to flee, "fifty thousand infidels were dispatched to hell by the sword" and "more than twenty thousand slaves, and cattle beyond all calculation fell into the hands of the victors". The temple was rebuilt by Mahipala Deva, the Chudasama king of Saurashtra in 1308 AD and the lingam was installed by his son Khengar sometime between 1326 and 1351 AD. In 1375 AD, the temple was once again destroyed by Muzaffar Shah I, the Sultan of Gujarat.

In 1451 AD, the temple was once again destroyed by Mahmud Begda, the Sultan of Gujarat. In 1701 AD, the temple was once again destroyed by Mughal Emperor Aurangzeb. Aurangzeb built a mosque on the site of the Somnath Temple, using some columns from the temple, whose Hindu sculptural motifs remained visible.

Mahmud of Ghazni was an Afghan Sultan who invaded the Indian subcontinent during the early 11th century. His campaigns across the gangetic plains are often cited for their iconoclastic plundering and destruction of temples such as those at Mathura and he looked upon their destruction as an act of "jihad". He sacked the second Somnath Temple in 1026, and looted it of gems and precious stones and the famous Shiva lingam of the temple was destroyed.

Historical records compiled by Muslim historian Maulana Hakim Saiyid Abdul Hai attest to the iconoclasm of Qutb-ud-din Aybak. The first mosque built in Delhi, the "Quwwat al-Islam" was built after the demolition of the Hindu temple built previously by Prithvi Raj and certain parts of the temple were left outside the mosque proper. This pattern of iconoclasm was common during his reign, although an argument goes that such iconoclasm was motivated more by politics than by religion.

Another ruler of the sultanate, Shams-ud-din Iltutmish, conquered and subjugated the Hindu pilgrimage site Varanasi in the 11th century and he continued the destruction of Hindu temples and idols that had begun during the first attack in 1194.

No aspect of Aurangzeb's reign is more cited—or more controversial—than the numerous desecrations and even the destruction of Hindu temples. During his reign, tens of thousands of temples were desecrated: their facades and interiors were defaced and their murtis (divine images) looted. In many cases, temples were destroyed entirely; in numerous instances mosques were built on their foundations, sometimes using the same stones. Among the temples Aurangzeb destroyed were two that are most sacred to Hindus, in Varanasi and Mathura. In both cases, he had large mosques built on the sites.

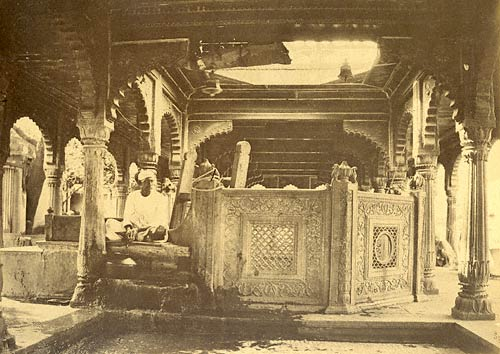
The original holy well – Gyanvapi in between temple and mosque.

The Kesava Deo temple in Mathura, marked the place that Hindus believe was the birthplace of Shri Krishna. In 1661 Aurangzeb ordered the demolition of the temple, and constructed the Katra Masjid mosque. Traces of the ancient Hindu temple can be seen from the back of the mosque. Aurangzeb also destroyed what was the most famous temple in Varanasi – the Kashi Vishwanath Temple.

The temple had changed its location over the years, and in 1585 Akbar had authorized its location at Gyan Vapi. Aurangzeb ordered its demolition in 1669 and constructed a mosque on the site, whose minarets stand 71 metres above the Ganges. Traces of the old temple can be seen behind the mosque. Centuries later, emotional debate about these wanton acts of cultural desecration continues. Aurangzeb also destroyed the Somnath temple in 1706.

Hindus claim that Mughals destroyed the Ram Mandir in Ayodhya, located at the birthplace of Rama, and built the Babri Masjid on the holy site, which has since been a source of tension between the Hindu and Muslim communities.

Writer Fernand Braudel wrote in A History of Civilizations (Penguin 1988/1963, pp. 232–236), Islamic rule in India as a "colonial experiment" was "extremely violent", and "the Muslims could not rule the country except by systematic terror. Cruelty was the norm – burnings, summary executions, crucifixions or impalements, inventive tortures. Hindu temples were destroyed to make way for mosques. On occasion there were forced conversions. If ever there were an uprising, it was instantly and savagely repressed: houses were burned, the countryside was laid waste, men were slaughtered and women were taken as slaves."

C. K. Kareem also notes that Tipu Sultan issued an edict for the destruction of Hindu temples in Kerala.

==== From the Mamluk dynasty onward ====
Historical records which were compiled by the Muslim historian Maulana Hakim Saiyid Abdul Hai attest to the religious violence which occurred during the Mamluk dynasty under Qutb-ud-din Aybak. The first mosque built in Delhi, the "Quwwat al-Islam" was built with demolished parts of 20 Hindu and Jain temples. This pattern of iconoclasm was common during his reign.

During the Delhi Sultanate, a Muslim army led by Malik Kafur, a general of Alauddin Khalji, pursued four violent campaigns into south India, between 1309 and 1311, against the Hindu kingdoms of Devgiri (Maharashtra), Warangal (Telangana), Dwarasamudra (Karnataka) and Madurai (Tamil Nadu). Many Temples were plundered; Hoysaleswara Temple and others were ruthlessly destroyed.

In Kashmir, Sikandar Shah Miri (1389–1413) began expanding, and unleashed religious violence that earned him the name but-shikan, or 'idol-breaker'. He earned this sobriquet because of the sheer scale of desecration and destruction of Hindu and Buddhist temples, shrines, ashrams, hermitages, and other holy places in what is now known as Kashmir and its neighboring territories. Firishta states: "After the emigration of the Brahmins, Sikundur ordered all the temples in Kashmeer to be thrown down." He destroyed vast majority of Hindu and Buddhist temples in his reach in Kashmir region (north and northwest India).

A regional tradition, along with the Hindu text Madala Panji, states that Kalapahar attacked and damaged the Konark Sun Temple in 1568, as well as many others in Orissa.

Some of the most dramatic cases of iconoclasm by Muslims are found in parts of India where Hindu and Buddhist temples were razed and mosques erected in their place. Aurangzeb, the 6th Mughal Emperor, destroyed the famous Hindu temples at Varanasi and Mathura, turning back on his ancestor Akbar's policy of religious freedom and establishing Sharia across his empire.

==== Contemporary ====
In June 2010, during rioting in Sangli, people threw stones inside a Ganesha mandal.

The 2010 Deganga riots began on 6 September when mobs resorted to arson and violence over a disputed structure at Deganga, Kartikpur and Beliaghata under the Deganga police station area. The violence began late in the evening and continued throughout the night into the next morning. The violence finally calmed down on 9 September after hundreds of business establishments and residences were looted, destroyed and burnt, dozens of people were severely injured and several places of worship desecrated and vandalized.

In June 2011 at Asansol Market area, a Hindu temple, under construction led by Bastim Bazaar Sarbojanin Durga Puja Committee was and approved by ADM on 12 April 2011, was attacked by an Islamic mob.

=== By Christians ===
==== During Goa inquisitions ====
Diago de Boarda, a priest, and his advisor Vicar General, Miguel Vaz, had made a 41-point plan for torturing Hindus. Under this plan Viceroy Antano de Noronha issued in 1566, an order applicable to the entire area under Portuguese rule:

I hereby order that in any area owned by my master, the king, nobody should construct a Hindu temple and such temples already constructed should not be repaired without my permission. If this order is transgressed, such temples shall be, destroyed and the goods in them shall be used to meet expenses of holy deeds, as punishment of such transgression.

In 1567 the campaign of destroying temples in Bardez met with success. At the end of it 300 Hindu temples were destroyed. In 1583 Hindu temples at Assolna and Cuncolim were destroyed through army action.

The fathers of the Church forbade the Hindus under terrible penalties the use of their own sacred books, and prevented them from all exercise of their religion. They destroyed their temples, and so harassed and interfered with the people that they abandoned the city in large numbers, refusing to remain any longer in a place where they had no liberty, and were liable to imprisonment, torture and death if they worshipped after their own fashion the gods of their fathers,

wrote Filippo Sassetti, who was in India from 1578 to 1588.

An order was issued in June 1684 eliminating the Konkani language and making it compulsory to speak Portuguese language. Following that law all the symbols of non-Christian sects were destroyed and the books written in local languages were burnt.

Exact data on the nature and number of Hindu temples destroyed by the Christian missionaries and Portuguese government are unavailable. Some 160 temples were allegedly razed to the ground in Tiswadi (Ilhas de Goa) by 1566. Between 1566 and 1567, a campaign by Franciscan missionaries destroyed another 300 Hindu temples in Bardez (North Goa). In Salcete (South Goa), approximately another 300 Hindu temples were destroyed by the Christian officials of the Inquisition. Numerous Hindu temples were destroyed elsewhere at Assolna and Cuncolim by Portuguese authorities. A 1569 royal letter in Portuguese archives records that all Hindu temples in its colonies in India had been burnt and razed to the ground. The English traveller Sir Thomas Herbert, 1st Baronet who visited Goa in the 1600s writes:

... as also the ruins of 200 Idol Temples which the Vice-Roy Antonio Norogna totally demolisht, that no memory might remain, or monuments continue, of such gross Idolatry. For not only there, but at Salsette also were two Temples or places of prophane Worship; one of them (by incredible toil cut out of the hard Rock) was divided into three Iles or Galleries, in which were figured many of their deformed Pagotha's, and of which an Indian (if to be credited) reports that there were in that Temple 300 of those narrow Galleries, and the Idols so exceeding ugly as would affright an European Spectator; nevertheless this was a celebrated place, and so abundantly frequented by Idolaters, as induced the Portuguise in zeal with a considerable force to master the Town and to demolish the Temples, breaking in pieces all that monstrous brood of mishapen Pagods. In Goa nothing is more observable now than the fortifications, the Vice-Roy and Arch-bishops Palaces, and the Churches. ...

=== Other ===
B. R. Ambedkar and his supporters on 25 December 1927 in the Mahad Satyagraha strongly criticised, condemned and then burned copies of Manusmriti on a pyre in a specially dug pit. Manusmriti, one of the sacred Hindu texts, is the religious basis of casteist laws and values of Hinduism and hence was/is the reason of social and economic plight of millions of untouchables and lower caste Hindus. Ambedkarites continue to observe 25 December as "Manusmriti Dahan Divas" (Manusmriti Burning Day) and burn copies of Manusmriti on this day.

== Contemporary iconoclasm against Hindus in other nations ==
==== In Bangladesh ====
A notable incident was the destruction of the Ramna Kali Mandir in former East Pakistan. The temple was bulldozed by the Pakistani Army on March 27, 1971. The Dhakeshwari Temple was severely damaged during the Indo-Pakistani War of 1971, and over half of the temple's buildings were destroyed. In a major disrespect of the religion, the main worship hall was taken over by the Pakistan Army and used as an ammunitions storage area. Several of the temple custodians were tortured and killed by the Army though most, including the head priest, fled first to their ancestral villages and then to India and therefore escaped death.

In Bangladesh atrocities including targeted attacks against temples and open theft of Hindu property have increased sharply in recent years after the Jamat-e-Islami joined the coalition government led by the Bangladesh National Party.

==== In Pakistan ====
Several Hindu temples have been destroyed in Pakistan.

In 2006 the last Hindu temple in Lahore was destroyed to pave the way for construction of a multi-story commercial building. The temple was demolished after officials of the Evacuee Property Trust Board concealed facts from the board chairman about the nature of the building. When reporters from Pakistan-based newspaper Dawn tried to cover the incident, they were accosted by the henchmen of the property developer, who denied that a Hindu temple existed at the site.

Several political parties in Pakistan have objected to this move, such as the Pakistan People's Party and the Pakistani Muslim League-N. The move has also evoked strong condemnation in India from minority bodies and political parties, including the Bharatiya Janata Party (BJP), the Congress Party, as well as Muslim advocacy political parties such as the All India Muslim Majlis-e-Mushawarat. A firm of lawyers representing the Hindu minority has approached the Lahore High Court seeking a directive to the builders to stop the construction of the commercial plaza and reconstruct the temple at the site. The petitioners maintain that the demolition violates section 295 of the Pakistan Penal Code prohibiting the demolition of places of worship.

On June 29, 2005, following the arrest of an illiterate Christian janitor on allegations of allegedly burning Qur'an pages, a mob of between 300 and 500 Muslims destroyed a Hindu temple and houses belonging to Christian and Hindu families in Nowshera. Under the terms of a deal negotiated between Islamic religious leaders and the Hindu/Christian communities, Pakistani police later released all previously arrested perpetrators without charge.

==== In Malaysia ====
Between April to May 2006, several Hindu temples were demolished by city hall authorities in the country, accompanied by violence against Hindus. On April 21, 2006, the Malaimel Sri Selva Kaliamman Temple in Kuala Lumpur was reduced to rubble after the city hall sent in bulldozers. Many Hindu advocacy groups have protested what they allege is a systematic plan of temple cleansing in Malaysia. The official reason given by the Malaysian government has been that the temples were built "illegally". However, several of the temples are centuries old. On May 11, 2006, armed city hall officers from Kuala Lumpur forcefully demolished part of a 60-year-old suburban temple that serves more than 1,000 Hindus.

==== In Saudi Arabia ====
On March 24, 2005, Saudi authorities destroyed religious items found in a raid on a makeshift Hindu shrine found in an apartment in Riyadh.

==== In Fiji ====
In Fiji according to official reports, attacks on Hindu institutions increased by 14% compared to 2004. This intolerance of Hindus has found expression in anti-Hindu speeches and destruction of temples, the two most common forms of immediate and direct violence against Hindus. Between 2001 and April 2005, one hundred cases of temple attacks have been registered with the police. The alarming increase of temple destruction has spread fear and intimidation among the Hindu minorities and has hastened immigration to neighboring Australia and New Zealand. Organized religious institutions, such as the Methodist Church of Fiji, have repeatedly called for the creation of a theocratic Christian State and have propagated anti-Hindu sentiment. State favoritism of Christianity, and systematic attacks on temples, are some of the greatest threats faced by Fijian Hindus. Despite the creation of a human rights commission, the plight of Hindus in Fiji continues to be precarious. Perhaps the most notorious episode of iconoclasm in India was Mahmud of Ghazni's attack on the Somnath Temple from across the Thar Desert. In 1026 during the reign of Bhima I, the prominent Turkic-Muslim ruler Mahmud of Ghazni raided Gujarat, plundering the Somnath Temple and breaking its jyotirlinga despite pleas by Brahmins not to break it. He took away a booty of 20 million dinars. The attack may have been inspired by the belief that an idol of the goddess Manat had been secretly transferred to the temple. According to the Ghaznavid court-poet Farrukhi Sistani, who claimed to have accompanied Mahmud on his raid, Somnat (as rendered in Persian) was a garbled version of su-manat referring to the goddess Manat. According to him, as well as a later Ghaznavid historian Abu Sa'id Gardezi, the images of the other goddesses were destroyed in Arabia but the one of Manat was secretly sent away to Kathiawar (in modern Gujarat) for safekeeping. Since the idol of Manat was an aniconic image of black stone, it could have been easily confused with a lingam at Somnath. Mahmud is said to have broken the idol and taken away parts of it as loot and placed so that people would walk on it. In his letters to the Caliphate, Mahmud exaggerated the size, wealth and religious significance of the Somnath temple, receiving grandiose titles from the Caliph in return.

The wooden structure was replaced by Kumarapala (r. 1143–72), who rebuilt the temple out of stone.

== Iconoclasm in East Asia ==
=== China ===
There have been a number of anti-Buddhist campaigns in Chinese history that led to the destruction of Buddhist temples and images. One of the most notable of these campaigns was the Great Anti-Buddhist Persecution of the Tang dynasty.

During and after the 1911 Xinhai Revolution, there was widespread destruction of religious and secular images in China.

During the Northern Expedition in Guangxi in 1926, Kuomintang General Bai Chongxi led his troops in destroying Buddhist temples and smashing Buddhist images, turning the temples into schools and Kuomintang party headquarters. It was reported that almost all of the viharas in Guangxi were destroyed and the monks were removed. Bai also led a wave of anti-foreignism in Guangxi, attacking Americans, Europeans, and other foreigners, and generally making the province unsafe for foreigners and missionaries. Westerners fled from the province and some Chinese Christians were also attacked as imperialist agents. The three goals of the movement were anti-foreignism, anti-imperialism and anti-religion. Bai led the anti-religious movement against superstition. Huang Shaohong, also a Kuomintang member of the New Guangxi clique, supported Bai's campaign. The anti-religious campaign was agreed upon by all Guangxi Kuomintang members.

There was extensive destruction of religious and secular imagery in Tibet after it was invaded and occupied by China.

Many religious and secular images were destroyed during the Cultural Revolution of 1966–1976, ostensibly because they were a holdover from China's traditional past (which the Communist regime led by Mao Zedong reviled). The Cultural Revolution included widespread destruction of historic artworks in public places and private collections, whether religious or secular. Objects in state museums were mostly left intact.

=== South Korea ===
Harry L. Wells writes in the journal Buddhist-Christian Studies:

Over the course of the last decade [1990s] a fairly large number of Buddhist temples in South Korea have been destroyed or damaged by fire by Christian fundamentalists. More recently, Buddhist statues have been identified as idols, and attacked and decapitated in the name of Jesus. Arrests are hard to effect, as the arsonists and vandals work by stealth of night.

=== Angkor ===
Beginning c. 1243 AD with the death of Indravarman II, the Khmer Empire went through a period of iconoclasm. At the beginning of the reign of the next king, Jayavarman VIII, the kingdom went back to Hinduism and the worship of Shiva. Many of the Buddhist images were destroyed by Jayavarman VIII, who reestablished previously Hindu shrines that had been converted to Buddhism by his predecessor. Carvings of the Buddha at temples such as Preah Khan were destroyed, and during this period the Bayon Temple was made a temple to Shiva, with the central 3.6-meter-tall (12 ft) statue of the Buddha cast to the bottom of a nearby well.

== Political iconoclasm ==
=== Damnatio memoriae ===
Revolutions and changes of regime, whether through uprising of the local population, foreign invasion, or a combination of both, are often accompanied by the public destruction of statues and monuments identified with the previous regime. This may also be known as damnatio memoriae, the ancient Roman practice of official obliteration of the memory of a specific individual. Stricter definitions of "iconoclasm" exclude both types of action, reserving the term for religious or more widely cultural destruction. In many cases, such as Revolutionary Russia or Ancient Egypt, this distinction can be hard to make.

Among Roman emperors and other political figures subject to decrees of damnatio memoriae were Sejanus, Publius Septimius Geta, and Domitian. Several Emperors, such as Domitian and Commodus had during their reigns erected numerous statues of themselves, which were pulled down and destroyed when they were overthrown.

The perception of damnatio memoriae in the Classical world as an act of erasing memory has been challenged by scholars who have argued that it "did not negate historical traces, but created gestures which served to dishonor the record of the person and so, in an oblique way, to confirm memory", and was in effect a spectacular display of "pantomime forgetfulness". Examining cases of political monument destruction in modern Irish history, Guy Beiner has demonstrated that iconoclastic vandalism often entails subtle expressions of ambiguous remembrance and that, rather than effacing memory, such acts of de-commemorating effectively preserve memory in obscure forms.

=== During the French Revolution ===
Throughout the radical phase of the French Revolution, iconoclasm was supported by members of the government as well as the citizenry. Numerous monuments, religious works, and other historically significant pieces were destroyed in an attempt to eradicate any memory of the Old Regime. A statue of King Louis XV in the Paris square which until then bore his name, was pulled down and destroyed. This was a prelude to the guillotining of his successor Louis XVI in the same site, renamed "Place de la Révolution" (at present Place de la Concorde). Later that year, the bodies of many French kings were exhumed from the Basilica of Saint-Denis and dumped in a mass grave.

Some episodes of iconoclasm were carried out spontaneously by crowds of citizens, including the destruction of statues of kings during the insurrection of 10 August 1792 in Paris. Some were directly sanctioned by the Republican government, including the Saint-Denis exhumations. Nonetheless, the Republican government also took steps to preserve historic artworks, notably by founding the Louvre museum to house and display the former royal art collection. This allowed the physical objects and national heritage to be preserved while stripping them of their association with the monarchy. Alexandre Lenoir saved many royal monuments by diverting them to preservation in a museum.

The statue of Napoleon on the column at Place Vendôme, Paris was also the target of iconoclasm several times: destroyed after the Bourbon Restoration, restored by Louis-Philippe, destroyed during the Paris Commune and restored by Adolphe Thiers.

After Napoleon conquered the Italian city of Pavia, local Pavia Jacobins destroyed the Regisole, a bronze classical equestrian monument dating back to Classical times. The Jacobins considered it a symbol of Royal authority, but it had been a prominent Pavia landmark for nearly a thousand years and its destruction aroused much indignation and precipitated a revolt by inhabitants of Pavia against the French, which was quelled by Napoleon after a furious urban fight.

=== Other examples ===
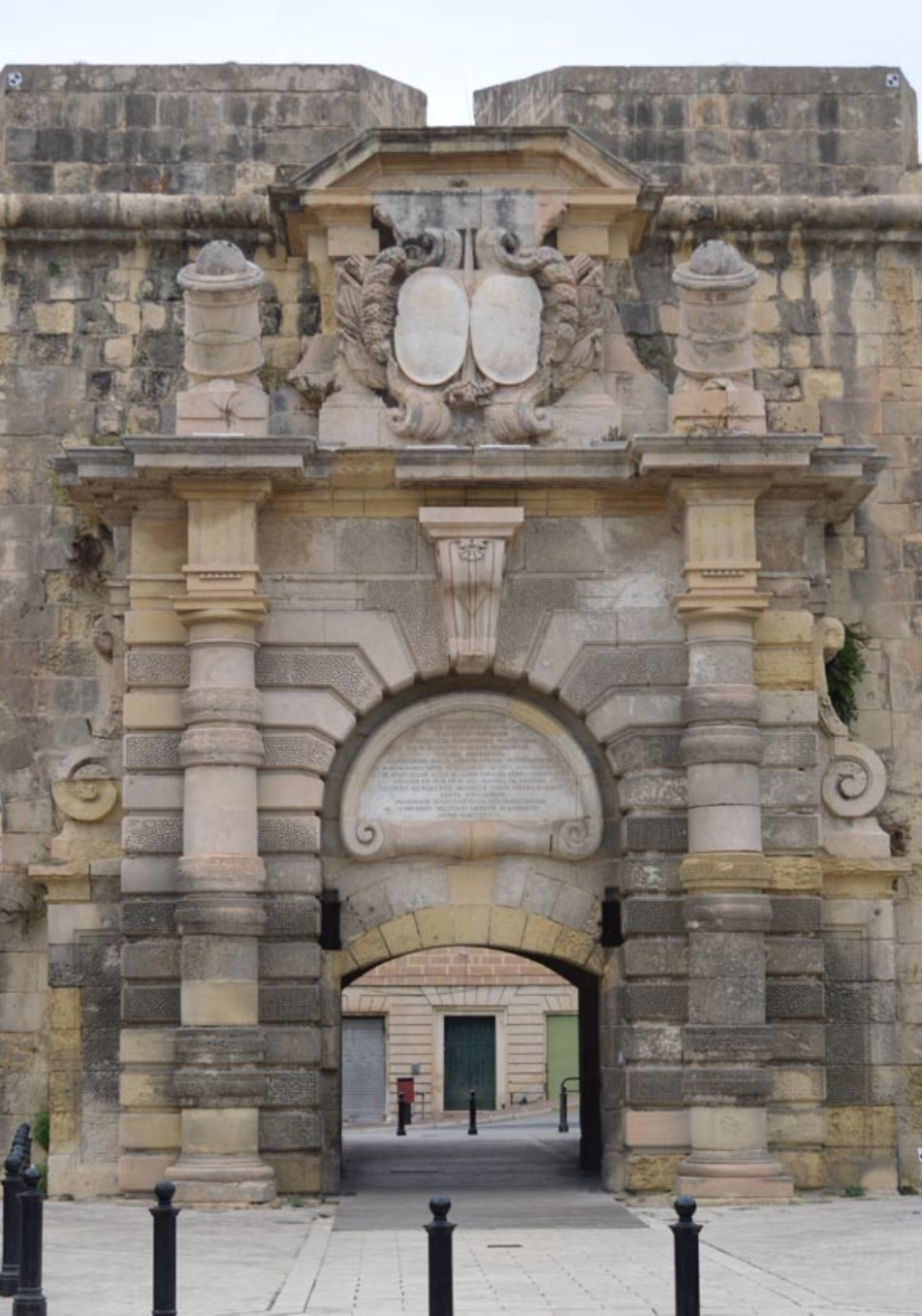
St. Helen's Gate in Cospicua, Malta, which had its marble coat of arms defaced during the French occupation of Malta

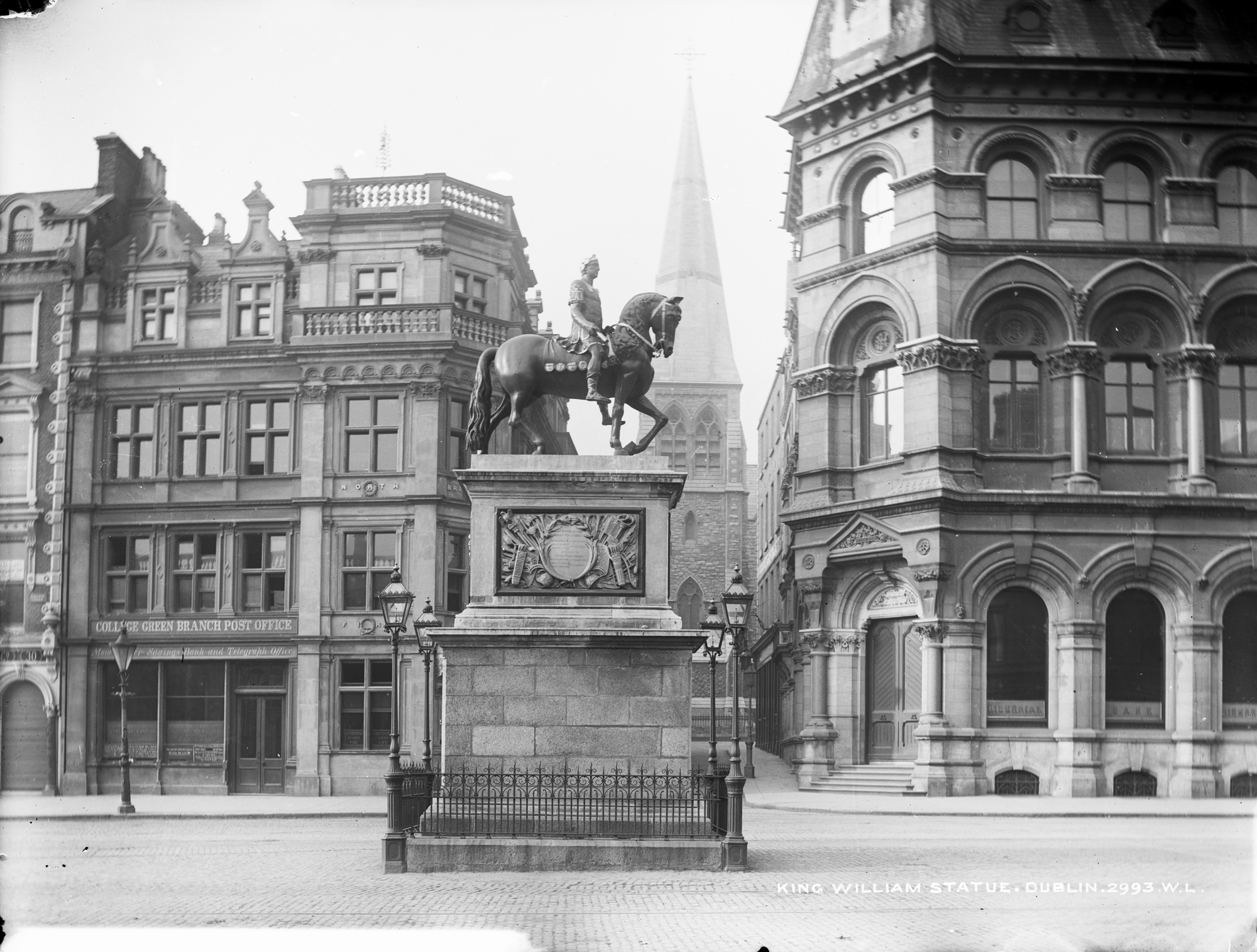
Statue of William of Orange formerly located on College Green, in Dublin. Erected in 1701, it was destroyed in 1929—one of several memorials installed during British rule which were destroyed after Ireland became independent.

Other examples of political destruction of images include:

- There have been several cases of removing symbols of past rulers in Malta's history. Many Hospitaller coats of arms on buildings were defaced during the French occupation of Malta in 1798–1800; a few of these were subsequently replaced by British coats of arms in the early 19th century. Some British symbols were also removed by the government after Malta became a republic in 1974. These include royal cyphers being ground off from post boxes, and British coats of arms such as that on the Main Guard building being temporarily obscured (but not destroyed).
- With the entry of the Ottoman Empire to the First World War, the Ottoman Army destroyed the Russian victory monument erected in San Stefano (the modern Yeşilköy quarter of Istanbul, Turkey) to commemorate the Russian victory in the Russo-Turkish War of 1877–1878. The demolition was filmed by former army officer Fuat Uzkınay, producing Ayastefanos'taki Rus Abidesinin Yıkılışı—the oldest known Turkish-made film.
- In the late 18th century, French revolutionaries known as the sans-culottes sacked Brussels' Grand-Place, destroying statues of nobility and symbols of Christianity. In the 19th century, the place was renovated and many new statues added. In 1911, a marble commemoration for the Spanish freethinker and educator Francisco Ferrer, executed two years earlier and widely considered a martyr, was erected in the Grand-Place. The statue depicted a nude man holding the Torch of Enlightenment. The Imperial German military, which occupied Belgium during the First World War, disliked the monument and destroyed it in 1915. It was restored in 1926 by the International Free Thought Movement.
- In 1942, the collaborationist Vichy Government of France took down and melted Clothilde Roch's statue of the 16th-century dissident intellectual Michael Servetus, who had been burned at the stake in Geneva at the instigation of Calvin. The Vichy authorities disliked the statue, as it was a celebration of freedom of conscience. In 1960, having found the original molds, the municipality of Annemasse had it recast and returned the statue to its previous place.
- A sculpture of the head of Spanish intellectual Miguel de Unamuno by Victorio Macho was installed in the City Hall of Bilbao, Spain. It was withdrawn in 1936 when Unamuno showed temporary support for the Nationalist side. During the Spanish Civil War, it was thrown into the estuary. It was later recovered. In 1984 the head was installed in Plaza Unamuno. In 1999, it was again thrown into the estuary after a political meeting of Euskal Herritarrok. It was substituted by a copy in 2000 after the original was located in the water.
- The Battle of Baghdad and the regime of Saddam Hussein symbolically ended with the Firdos Square statue destruction, a U.S. military-staged event on 9 April 2003 where a prominent statue of Saddam Hussein was pulled down. Subsequently, statues and murals of Saddam Hussein all over Iraq were destroyed by US occupation forces as well as Iraqi citizens.

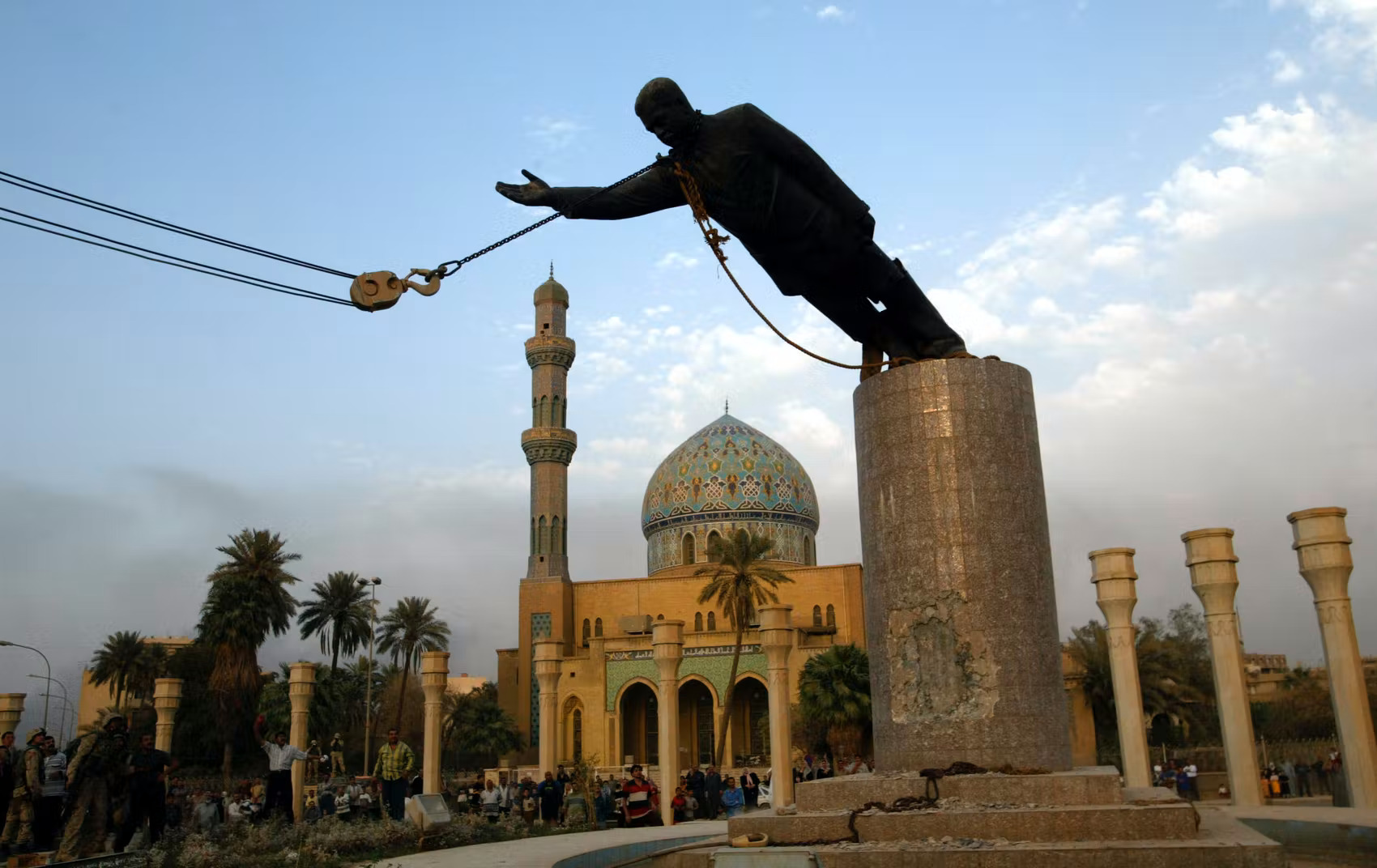
United States Marines destroy a statue of Saddam Hussein on Firdos Square, in Baghdad, Iraq, 9 April 2003.

- In 2016, paintings from the University of Cape Town, South Africa, were burned in student protests as symbols of colonialism.
- In November 2019, a statue of Swedish footballer Zlatan Ibrahimović in Malmö, Sweden, was vandalized by Malmö FF supporters after he announced he had become part-owner of Swedish rivals Hammarby. White paint was sprayed on it; threats and hateful messages towards Zlatan were written on the statue, and it was burned. In a second attack the nose was sawed off and the statue was sprinkled with chrome paint. On 5 January 2020 it was finally toppled.
- On 7 June 2020, during the George Floyd protests, a statue of merchant and trans-Atlantic slave trader Edward Colston in Bristol, UK, was pulled down by demonstrators who then jumped on it. They daubed it in red and blue paint, and one protester placed his knee on the statue's neck to allude to Floyd's murder by a white policeman who knelt on Floyd's neck for over nine minutes. The statue was then rolled down Anchor Road and pushed into Bristol Harbour.

=== In the Soviet Union ===
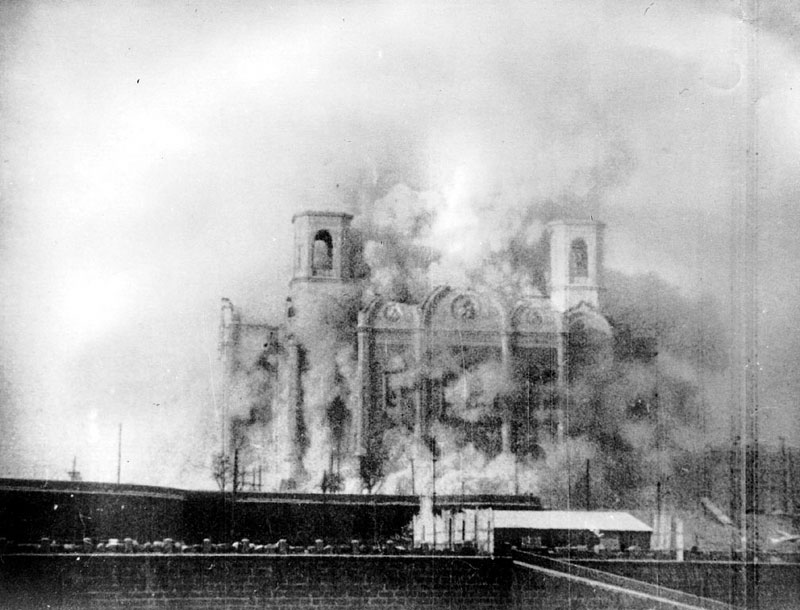
Demolition of the Cathedral of Christ the Saviour, in Moscow, Russia, 5 December 1931

During and after the October Revolution, widespread destruction of religious and secular imagery in Russia took place, as well as the destruction of imagery related to the Imperial family. The Revolution was accompanied by destruction of monuments of tsars, as well as the destruction of imperial eagles at various locations throughout Russia. According to Christopher Wharton:

In front of a Moscow Cathedral, crowds cheered as the enormous statue of Tsar Alexander III was bound with ropes and gradually beaten to the ground. After a considerable amount of time, the statue was decapitated and its remaining parts were broken into rubble.

The Soviet Union actively destroyed religious sites, including Russian Orthodox churches and Jewish cemeteries, in order to discourage religious practice and curb the activities of religious groups.

During the Hungarian Revolution of 1956 and during the Revolutions of 1989, protesters often attacked and took down sculptures and images of Joseph Stalin, such as the Stalin Monument in Budapest.

The fall of Communism in 1989–1991 was also followed by the destruction or removal of statues of Vladimir Lenin and other Communist leaders in the former Soviet Union and in other Eastern Bloc countries. Particularly well-known was the destruction of "Iron Felix", the statue of Felix Dzerzhinsky outside the KGB's headquarters. Another statue of Dzerzhinsky was destroyed in a Warsaw square that was named after him during communist rule, but which is now called Bank Square.

=== In the United States ===
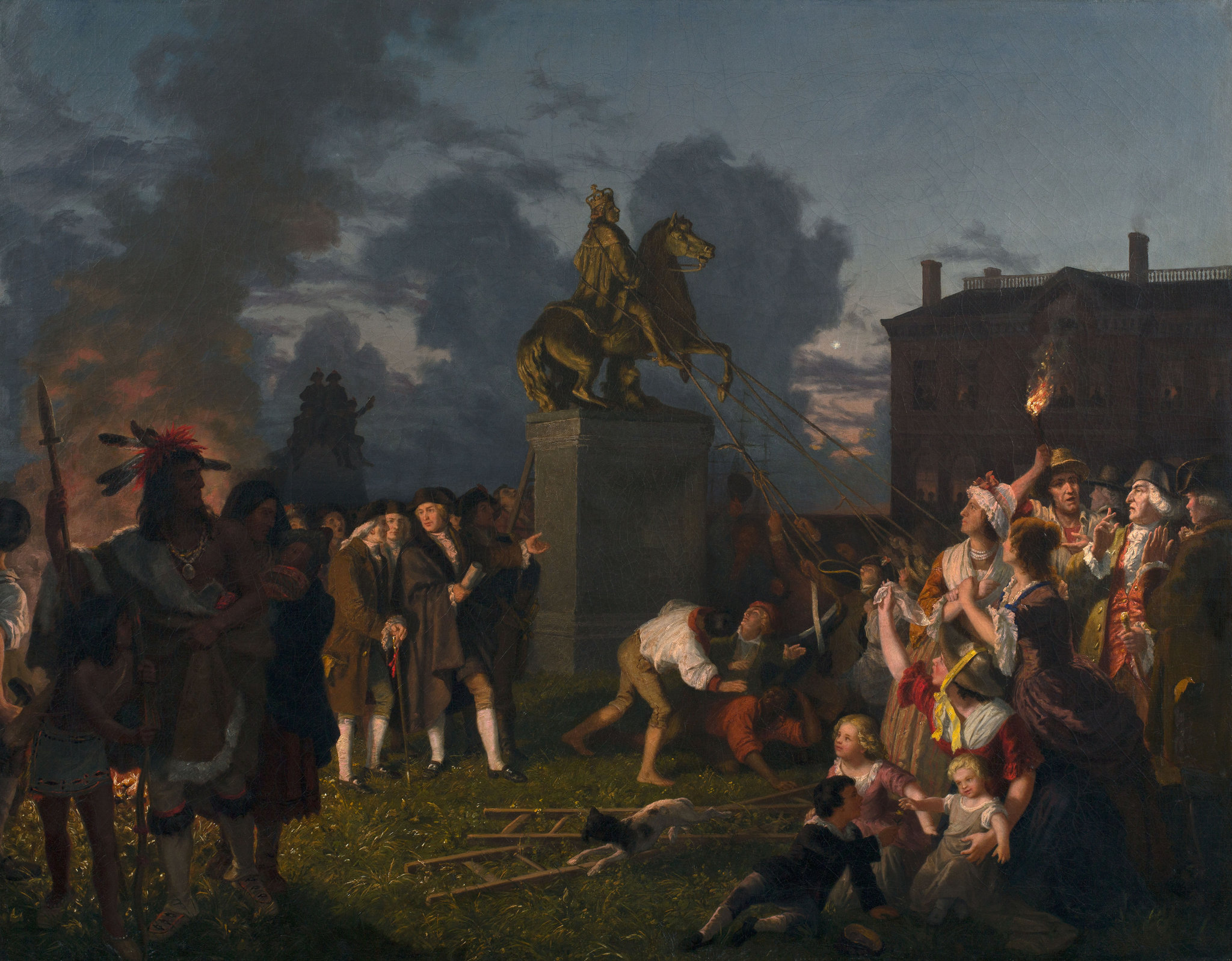
The Sons of Liberty pulling down the statue of George III of the United Kingdom on Bowling Green (New York City), 1776

During the American Revolution, the Sons of Liberty pulled down and destroyed the gilded lead statue of George III of the United Kingdom on Bowling Green (New York City), melting it down to be recast as ammunition. Sometimes relatively intact monuments are moved to a collected display in a less prominent place, as in India and also post-Communist countries.

In August 2017, a statue of a Confederate soldier dedicated to "the boys who wore the gray" was pulled down from its pedestal in front of Durham County Courthouse in North Carolina by protesters. This followed the events at the 2017 Unite the Right rally in response to growing calls to remove Confederate monuments and memorials across the U.S.

==== 2020 demonstrations ====
During the George Floyd protests of 2020, demonstrators pulled down dozens of statues which they considered symbols of the Confederacy, slavery, segregation, or racism, including the statue of Williams Carter Wickham in Richmond, Virginia.

Further demonstrations in the wake of the George Floyd protests have resulted in the removal of:

- the John Breckenridge Castleman monument in Louisville, Kentucky;
- plaques in Jacksonville, Florida's Hemming Park (renamed in 1899 in honor of Civil War veteran Charles C. Hemming), which were in remembrance of deceased Confederate soldiers;
- the monumental obelisk of the Confederate Soldiers and Sailors Monument and a statue of Charles Linn in Linn Park, Birmingham, Alabama;
- a statue of Junípero Serra in Golden Gate Park, San Francisco;
- a statue of Confederate Gen. Robert E. Lee in Montgomery, Alabama;
- the monument to Robert E. Lee in Richmond, Virginia;
- the Appomattox statue in Alexandria, Virginia, leaving the monument's base empty but intact.

Multiple statues of early European explorers and founders were also vandalized, including those of Christopher Columbus, George Washington, and Thomas Jefferson.

- Christopher Columbus was removed in Virginia, Minnesota, Chicago and beheaded in Boston MA.
- George Washington statue was toppled in Portland, Oregon.

== See also ==
- Aniconism
- Anti-Catholicism
  - Art in the Protestant Reformation and Counter-Reformation
- Censorship by religion
- Cult image
- Cultural Revolution
- De-commemoration
- Icon
- Iconolatry
- List of destroyed heritage
- Lost artworks
- Natural theology
- Slighting
- Council of Constantinople (843)
