= Linn Park =

Linn Park can mean:

- Linn Park, Birmingham, Alabama, a seven-acre urban park in the centre of Birmingham, Alabama
- Linn Park, Glasgow, an 82-hectare park surrounded by the suburbs of Glasgow, and Netherlee, in Scotland.
