= Charles Linn =

Finnish-American banker and seacaptain

Captain Charles Linn
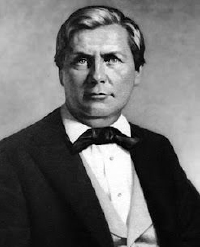
- Born: Carl Erik Engelbert Sjödahl; June 13, 1814; Pohja, Grand Duchy of Finland
- Died: August 7, 1882 (aged 68); Birmingham, Alabama
- Burial place: Oak Hill Cemetery (Birmingham, Alabama)
- Education: Royal Academy of Turku
- Military career
- Branch: Confederate States Navy
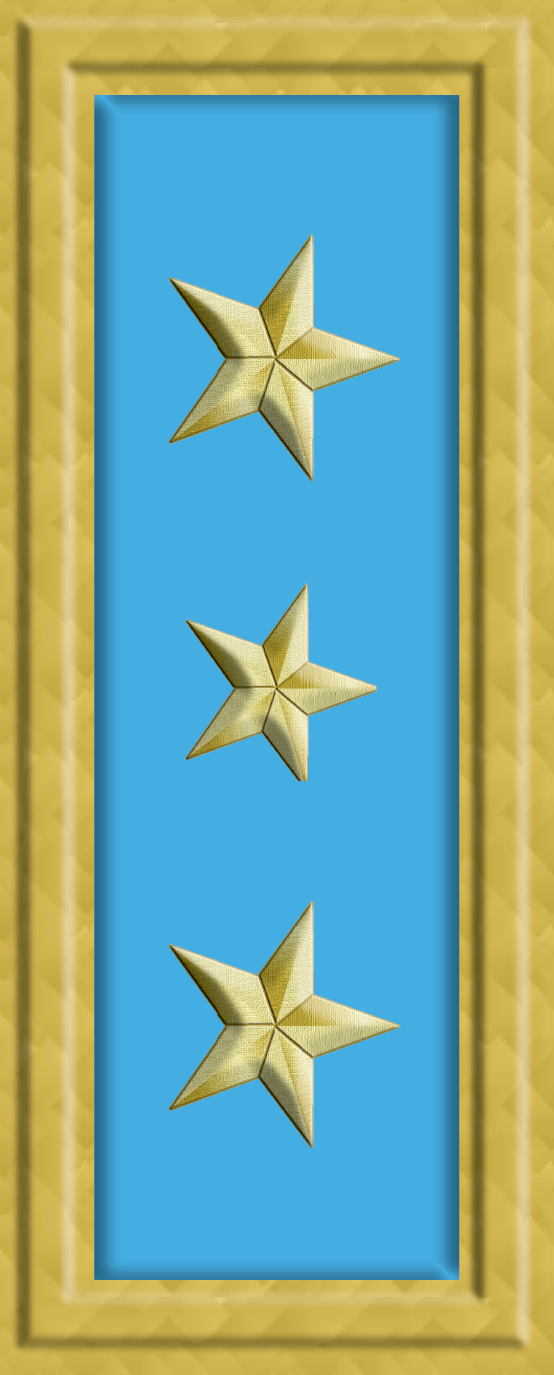
- Rank: Captain (CSN)
- Commands: CSS Kate Dale (see also List of ships of the Confederate States Navy)
- Conflicts: July 14, 1863 capture by the USS R. R. Cuyler
- Awards: Birmingham Business Hall of Fame, 2005
- Memorials: Linn Park, Birmingham, Alabama; Statue of Charles Linn; Linn-Henley Research Library
- Other work: wholesaler, banker and industrialist

Charles Linn born Carl Erik Engelbert Sjödahl (June 13, 1814 – August 7, 1882) was a sailor, wholesaler, banker, and industrialist. He was a captain in the Confederate Navy and an important figure in Alabama's early economy.

== Early life ==
Carl Erik Engelbert Sjödahl was born in Pohja (Swedish: Pojo) in the Uusimaa region of Finland. Pojo was then subject to the crown of Russia. His family were Swedish-speaking Finns. Linn was the son of the manager of an ironworks owned by the ancient company of Billnäs Bruk. He was attending the Royal Academy of Turku when the city burned in the Great Fire of Turku. He joined a sailing crew and became an accomplished seafarer, crossing the Atlantic Ocean 53 times and circumnavigating the globe three times before immigrating to the United States. He settled in Montgomery, Alabama in 1838 and opened a mercantile store.

== Career ==
Linn prospered in Montgomery and added a farming spread to his holdings. He sold his business at the start of the American Civil War and returned to the seas as a captain in the Confederate States Navy, charged with running ships laden with Southern cotton to Liverpool to raise war funds. His ship, the CSS Kate Dale was captured on July 14, 1863, by the USS R. R. Cuyler off the Florida Keys. Linn and his son were captured, and taken to Washington, D.C., where they were quickly pardoned. Linn resumed the mercantile business with a wholesale grocery warehouse in New Orleans, Louisiana, importing dozens of his countrymen from Finland to work in his company.

Linn sold off his New Orleans business and retired to Montgomery, where a group of businessmen which included James R. Powell interested him in the idea of opening a bank in the newly founded City of Birmingham. He agreed and launched the National Bank of Birmingham (now Regions Financial) in 1872 with $50,000 in gold. Later that year, Linn erected the monumental 3-story National Bank of Birmingham building on the corner of 1st Avenue North and 20th Street at a time when the city's future was doubtful. The building became known as "Linn's Folly", and it was there that Linn hosted the legendary New Year's Eve "Calico Ball" that signaled the city's emergence from a cholera epidemic.

Linn extended his investments from banking to industry, organizing two of the city's first such ventures, the Linn Iron Works and the Birmingham Car and Foundry Company with skilled workers brought in from Cleveland and Cincinnati, Ohio. Linn died in Birmingham, Alabama. He is entombed in Birmingham's Oak Hill Cemetery.

== Legacy ==
Birmingham's most prominent park, formerly named for Woodrow Wilson, was renamed "Linn Park" in the 1980s, and a statue of Linn was placed there and dedicated on World MS Day on May 29, 2013. The statue was commissioned from sculptor Branko Medenica by the Alabama-Mississippi Chapter of the National Multiple Sclerosis Society in honor of their "Legacy of Leadership" campaign chairman, Arthur Henley, a descendant of Linn. It was toppled by protestors on May 31, 2020. The Linn-Henley Research Library is also named in honor of Linn and his descendants. In 2005 Linn was inducted into the Birmingham Business Hall of Fame.
