= Statue of Charles Linn =

Statue in Birmingham, Alabama

- Artist: Branko Medenica
- Year: 2013
- Medium: Bronze sculpture; granite (base)
- Subject: Charles Linn
- Location: Birmingham, Alabama, U.S.; 33°31′12″N 86°48′35″W

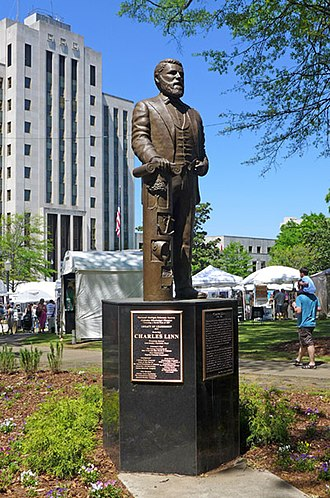
Picture of the Statue of Charles Linn.

A statue of Charles Linn was previously installed in Birmingham, Alabama's Linn Park, in the United States. The statue was erected in 2012 and toppled in 2020.

== Description ==
The 8-foot (2.4 m) bronze sculpture depicts Charles Linn, and rests on a 5-foot (1.5 m) granite-clad base. The statue is based on a painting displayed in the Linn-Henley Research Library (but shows Linn bearded, whereas the painting does not) and weighs approximately 800 pounds (360 kg). Linn's hand rests on a pillar, representing the establishment of the National Bank of Birmingham. The memorial also has plaques about Linn and identifying major donors.

== History ==
The statue was commissioned from sculptor Branko Medenica by the Alabama-Mississippi Chapter of the National Multiple Sclerosis Society in honor of their "Legacy of Leadership" campaign chairman, Arthur Henley, a descendant of Linn. The statue was announced in 2012, and dedicated on "World MS Day" on May 29, 2013. Medenica attended the dedication.

Linn was honored for his contribution to the early development of Birmingham, a city founded several years after the U.S. Civil War. His National Bank of Birmingham, which survives as the Regions Financial Corporation, was a signal institution in the young city. During the war, Linn sent his wife and younger children to Dresden and moved with his oldest son, Charles Washington Linn, to Mobile, where they set themselves up as blockade runners under contract to the Confederate Quartermaster Bureau. The venture failed and the Linns were captured as prisoners of war. After their parole, Linn took a position with a New Orleans wholesaler before founding his bank in the newly created city of Birmingham.

On May 31, 2020, during the George Floyd protests, Linn Park filled with protesters eager to destroy the nearby Confederate Soldiers and Sailors Monument. Because of his association with the Confederacy, Linn's statue was also defaced and eventually toppled.

Medenica, who had incorporated a tribute of his own to his sister-in-law who died of Multiple Sclerosis, said he understood why the statue was toppled but lamented the loss of his personal commemoration: "They didn't know. I think it was like mass hysteria gone out of control. You know so it sad. It's sad." The artist has said he would be willing to restore the sculpture.

== See also ==
- List of monuments and memorials removed during the George Floyd protests
