= Linn Park, Birmingham, Alabama =

Park in Birmingham, Alabama

Linn Park
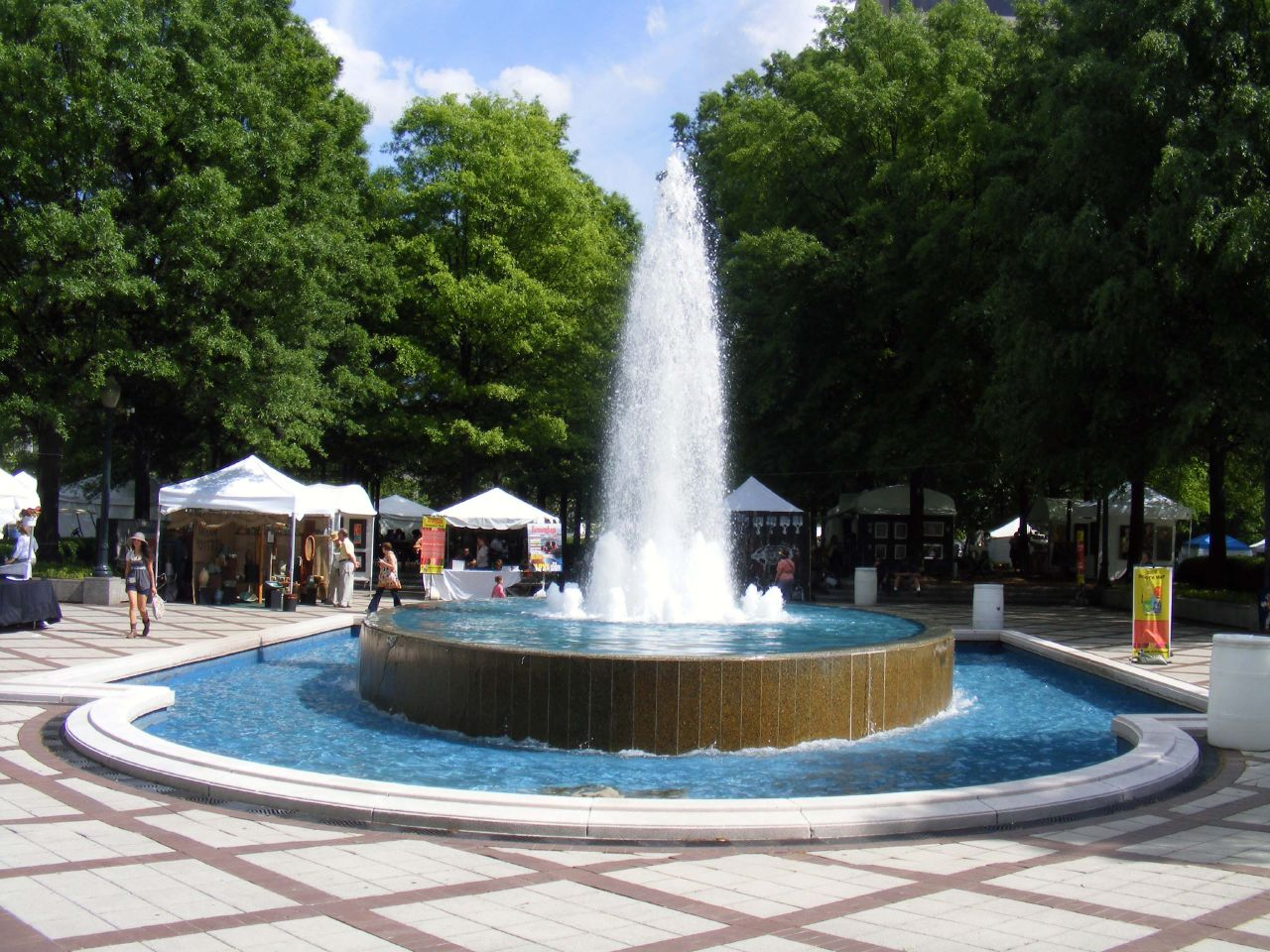
- Fountain in Linn Park
- Interactive map of Linn Park
- Type: Urban park
- Location: Birmingham, Alabama
- Coordinates: 33.5207°N 86.8098°W
- Area: 7 acres (2.8 ha)

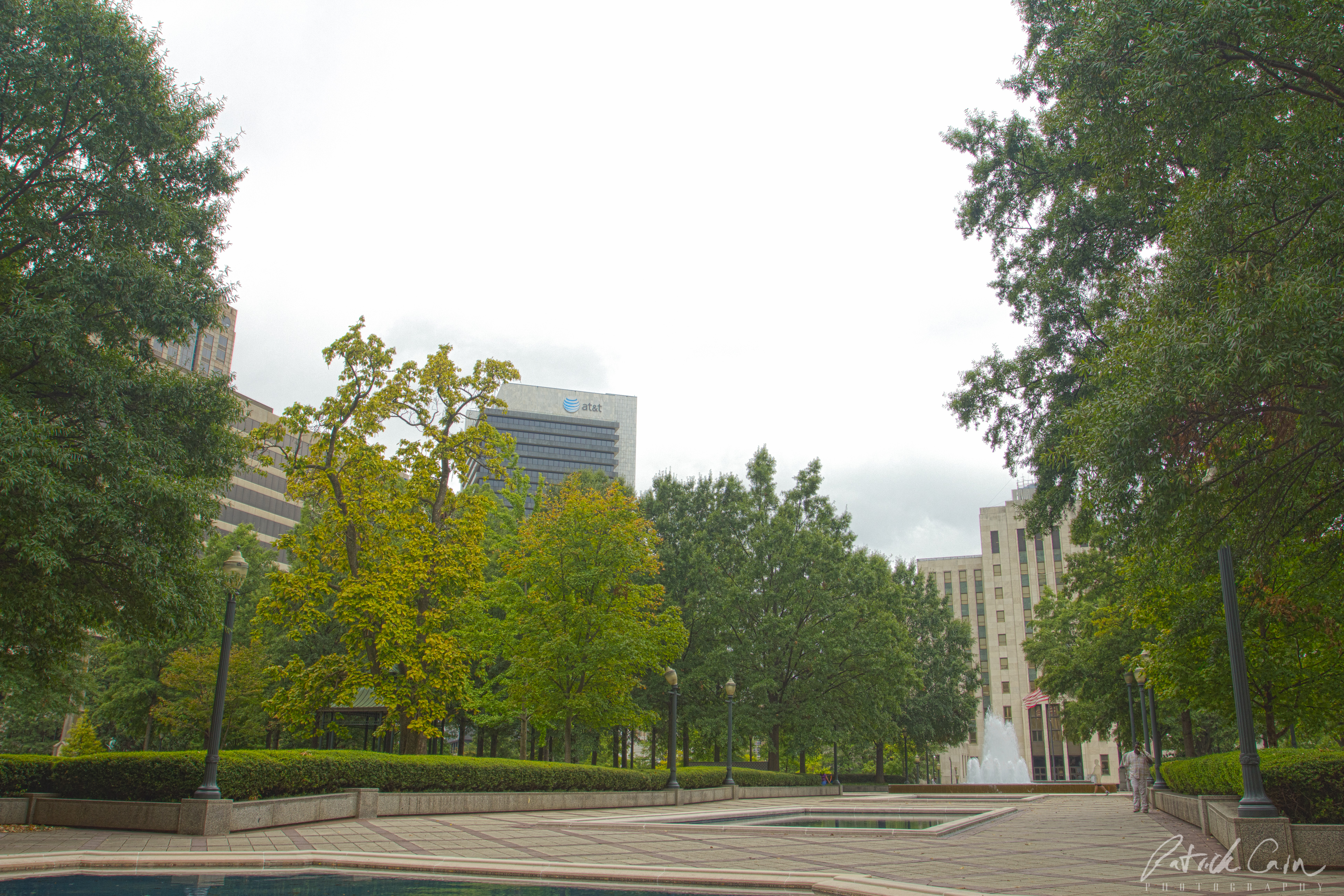
View from within the park

Linn Park is a seven-acre (2.8 ha) urban park in the centre of Birmingham, Alabama. It is overlooked by Birmingham City Hall on the west side and Jefferson County Courthouse on the east side. Formerly known as Capitol Park, Woodrow Wilson Park, and Central Park, the park was renamed after Confederate naval officer and businessman Charles Linn in the 1980s.

== Confederate monuments ==
From 1905 until 2020, the park was home to the Confederate Soldiers and Sailors Monument, a 52-foot (16 m)-high obelisk erected by the Daughters of the Confederacy, even though the city itself did not exist until after the Civil War. Following protests in 2020 after the murder of George Floyd, during which protestors damaged and tried to remove the monument, the mayor removed the obelisk, leaving only the plinth. A statue of Charles Linn was installed in 2013 and toppled on May 31, 2020, during the George Floyd protests. The state Attorney General responded by filing a new lawsuit against the city.
