= List of George Floyd protests outside the United States =

International George Floyd protests
- Part of George Floyd protests
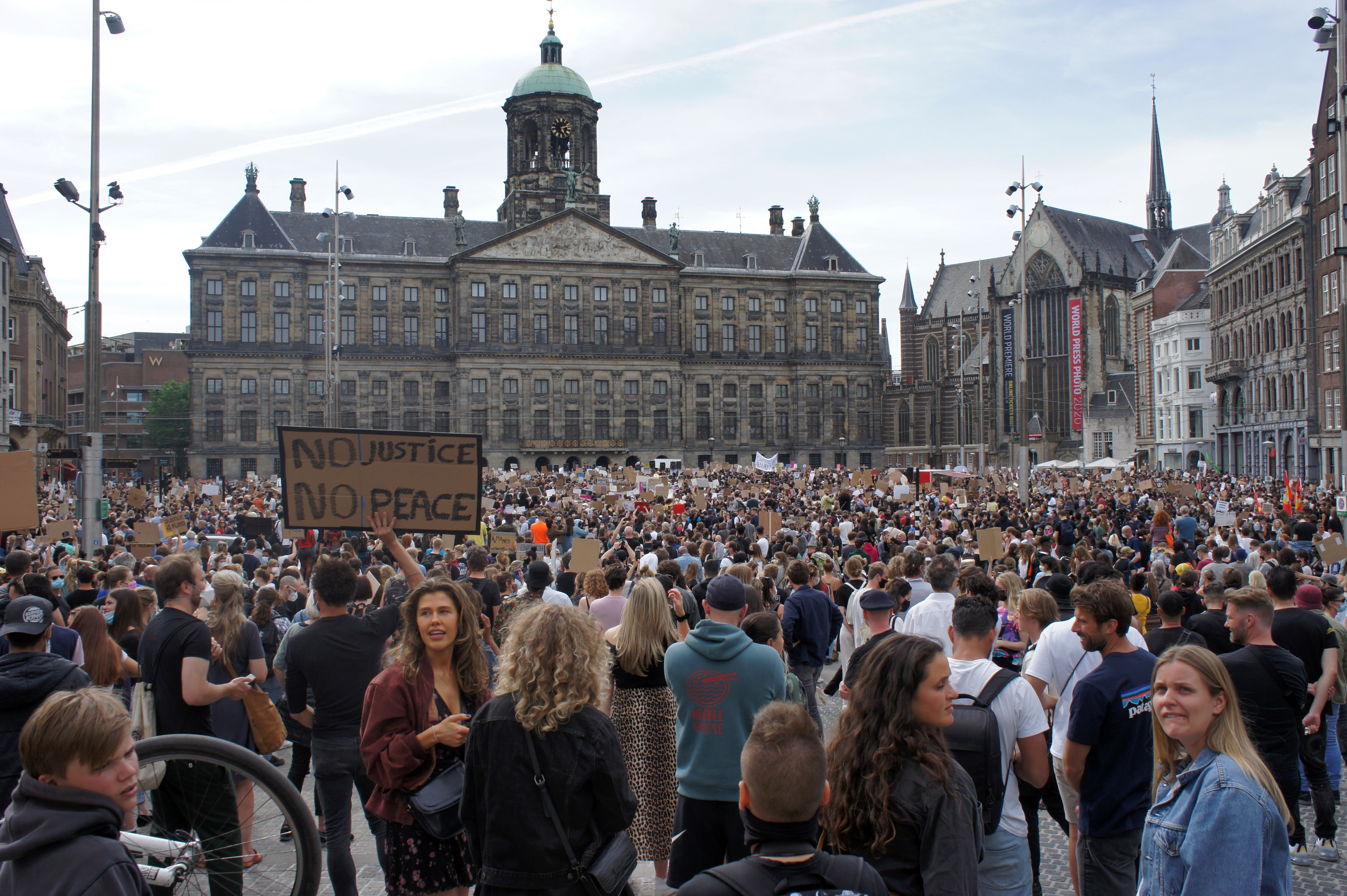
- Protest at Dam Square in Amsterdam, June 1, 2020
- Date: 28 May 2020 – 22 May 2021 (11 months, 3 weeks and 4 days)
- Location: Worldwide
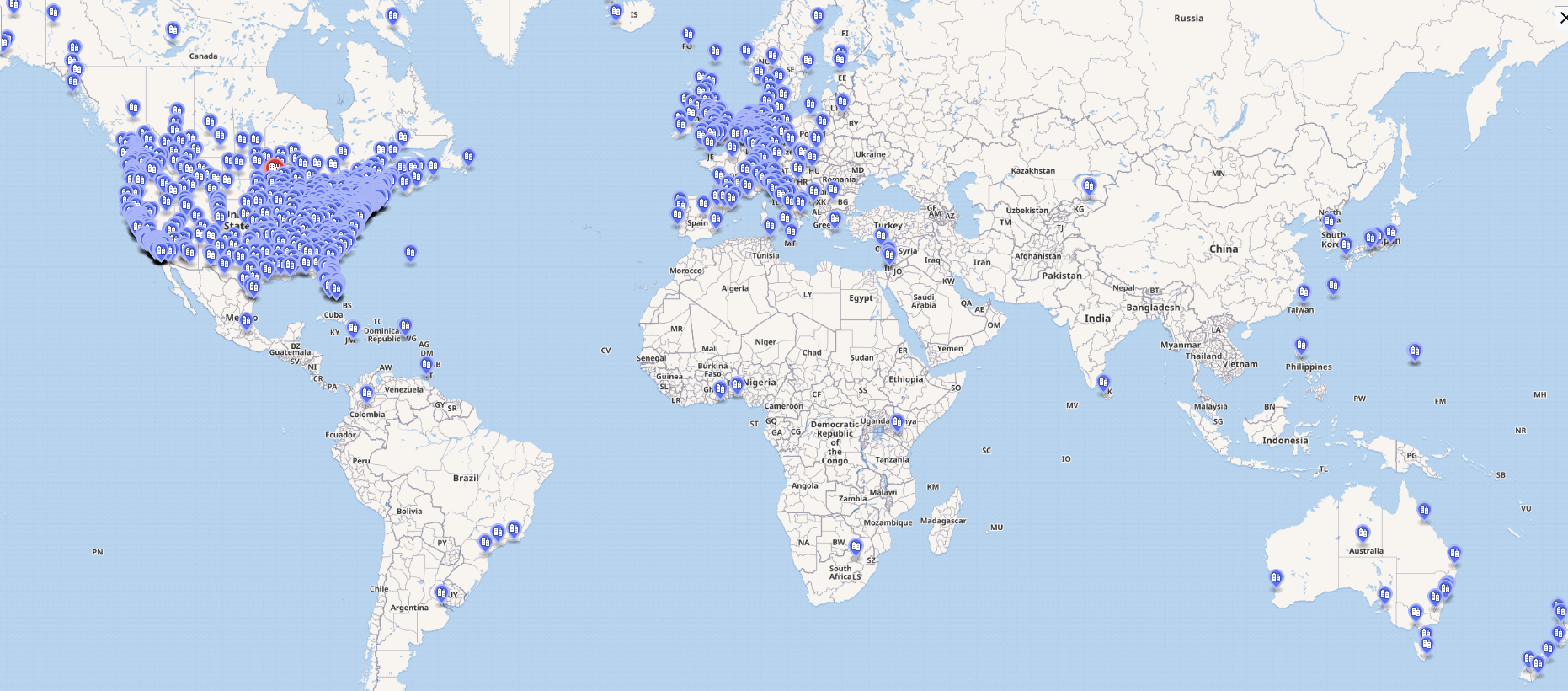
- Map of protests around the world with over 100 participants (click for a dynamic version of the map)

George Floyd, an African American man, was murdered on May 25, 2020, during a police arrest. Protests seeking justice for Floyd began in the United States the next day, with citizens of other countries soon following suit. Internationally, protesters demonstrated opposition to racism worldwide, opposed police brutality, questioned the arming of police, and expressed solidarity with their counterparts in the United States. Prominent local issues included the 2016 death of Adama Traoré near Paris while in police custody (for whom roughly 20,000 people protested at various times) and the high rate of death amongst incarcerated Indigenous Australians.

Protests took place in over 60 countries. The protests took place during the COVID-19 pandemic, during which gathering in crowds was strongly advised against in some parts of the world, and outright banned in others.

== Africa ==
=== Eastern Africa ===
- Kenya:
  - Nairobi:
    - Dozens of people protested peacefully outside the US Embassy on June 2. Protesters also criticized Kenyan police over "extrajudicial killings and use of unnecessary force when enforcing Covid-19 rules" and accused the embassy of implied approval of American police brutality by remaining silent during the protests in the states.
    - About 200 marched against police brutality in Mathare.
- Uganda
  - Kampala: Twelve foreign nationals and three Ugandans were arrested in an anti-racism and anti-police brutality protest on June 9.

=== Northern Africa ===
- Tunisia:
  - Tunis: About 200 people protested in front of the Théâtre municipal de Tunis on June 6, 2020.

=== Southern Africa ===
- South Africa:
  - Cape Town: A group of South Africans protested outside Parliament to show solidarity with George Floyd and Collins Khosa, a resident of Johannesburg who died after being allegedly assaulted by soldiers on April 10, 2020.
  - Johannesburg: About 100 protesters closed a major thoroughfare on June 8 in front of the US Consulate General. They knelt in the street for 8 minutes 46 seconds. The Economic Freedom Fighters said the South African government is not doing enough to stop brutality perpetrated by its own police and army.
  - Pretoria: People protested at the US Embassy seeking justice for Floyd and Collins Khosa.

=== Western Africa ===
- Ghana
  - Accra: People protested peacefully while marching to the US Embassy on June 1.
- Liberia:
  - Monrovia: Dozens of people protested peacefully in front of the US Embassy on May 28.
- Nigeria:
  - Abuja: People protested outside the US Embassy on May 28, despite armed policemen stationed there.
  - Lagos: The Black Lives Matter Movement in Nigeria protested in Victoria Island despite heavy rainfall. Critics were concerned instead about obtaining justice for 16-year-old Tina Ezekwe, who was suspected of being killed by Lagos State Police Command officers, and 22-year-old microbiology student Uwaila Omozuwa, (Note: Some sources reported that she was 23 years old. Also, some sources reported her name as Uwavera Omozuwa.) who was raped and killed at a church near Benin City.
- Senegal:
  - Dakar:
    - Students of Cheikh Anta Diop University protested peacefully, seeking justice for Floyd and an end to racism, particularly in the United States.
    - Dozens of people protested to remember Floyd and denounce police brutality, taking a knee in solidarity.

== Asia ==
=== Central Asia ===
- Kazakhstan:
  - Almaty: Over 100 people participated in anti-government protests in Almaty. One group of protestors held a banner that read "I Can't Breathe". Dozens of people were detained by police. The protest in Almaty was one of many protests nationwide, with protests also occurring in Nur-Sultan, Shymkent, Semei, Aqtobe, Oral, and Qyzylorda. Nationwide, over 100 protestors were detained, despite a more liberal protest law coming into force that day.
- Kyrgyzstan:
  - Bishkek: A rally was scheduled to be held in Gorky Park, but the organizers decided to cancel it for safety reasons and fear of provocations. A single protester who had seen the announcement for the planned protest went anyway and held a picket, holding a sign reading "authorities violence has no borders." Three police officers watched over the one-man protest.

=== Eastern Asia ===
- China, Hong Kong Special Administrative Region:
  - Dozens of people protested peacefully in front of the US Consulate General, despite heavy rainfall.

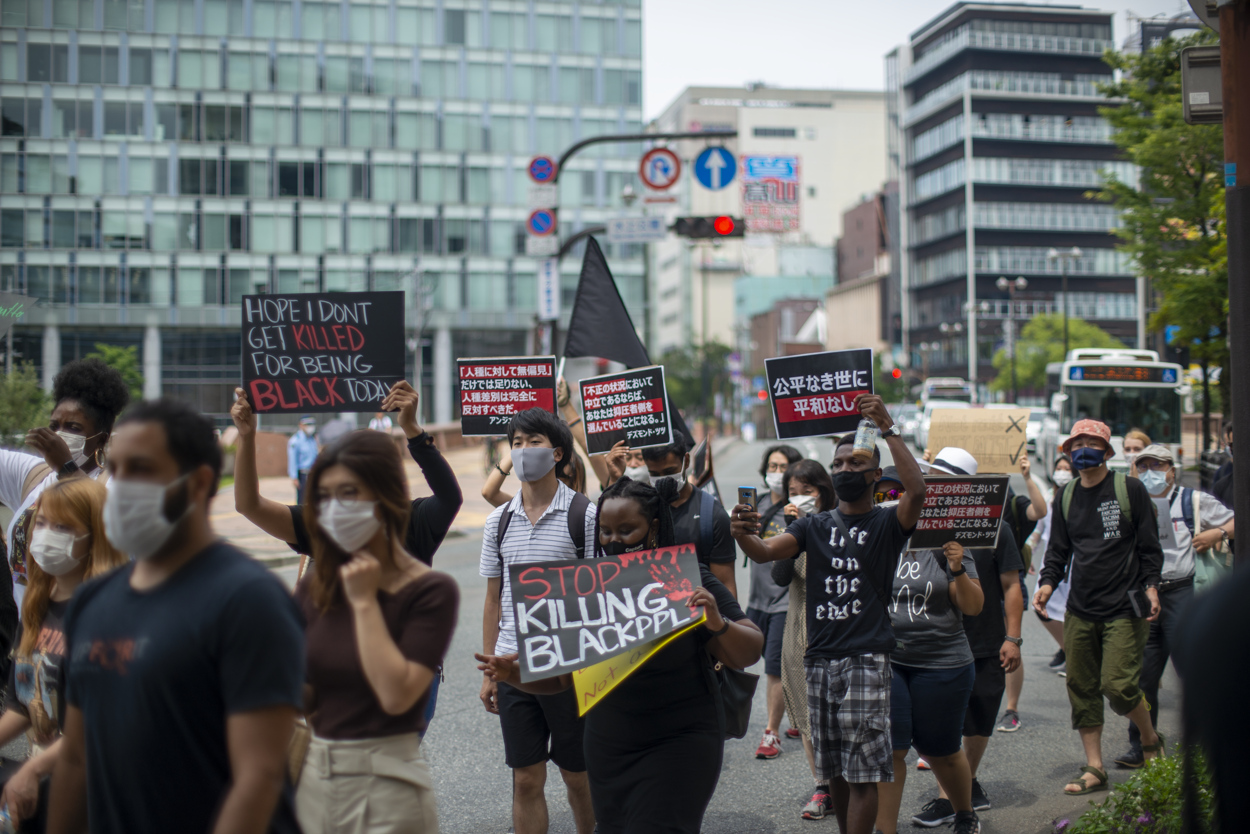
Protest in Fukuoka, June 21

- Japan:
  - Chatan: About 400 people held a vigil for George Floyd outside Chapel 1 on Kadena Air Base in Okinawa. The vigil was held in solidarity against racism, both in the US and in the United States Air Force. Attendees observed 8 minutes 46 seconds of silence. Some protestors also took a knee.
  - Fukuoka: About 200 people protested at Tenjin Central Park.
  - Kyoto: About 1000 people gathered near Yasaka Shrine and observed 8 minutes 46 seconds of silence before marching to City Hall. Attendees came from as far away as Okinawa and Hiroshima.
  - Nagoya: About 300 people protested against racism downtown around the Sakae area in a demonstration organized by three high school students.
  - Osaka: On June 7, nearly 1000 people participated in a demonstration organized in Osaka by the Kansai chapter of Black Lives Matter.
  - Tokyo:
    - Around 200 people peacefully protested on May 30 against police brutality in light of the murder of Floyd and the beating by police of an ethnically Kurdish man living in Tokyo.
    - Another protest followed on June 6 in Shibuya with over 500 participants.
    - Someone claiming to be a member of Antifa threatened to bomb the immigration office and police station.
    - On June 14, thousands of people participated in a protest in Tokyo against police brutality and racism in the US and racism in Japan.
- South Korea:
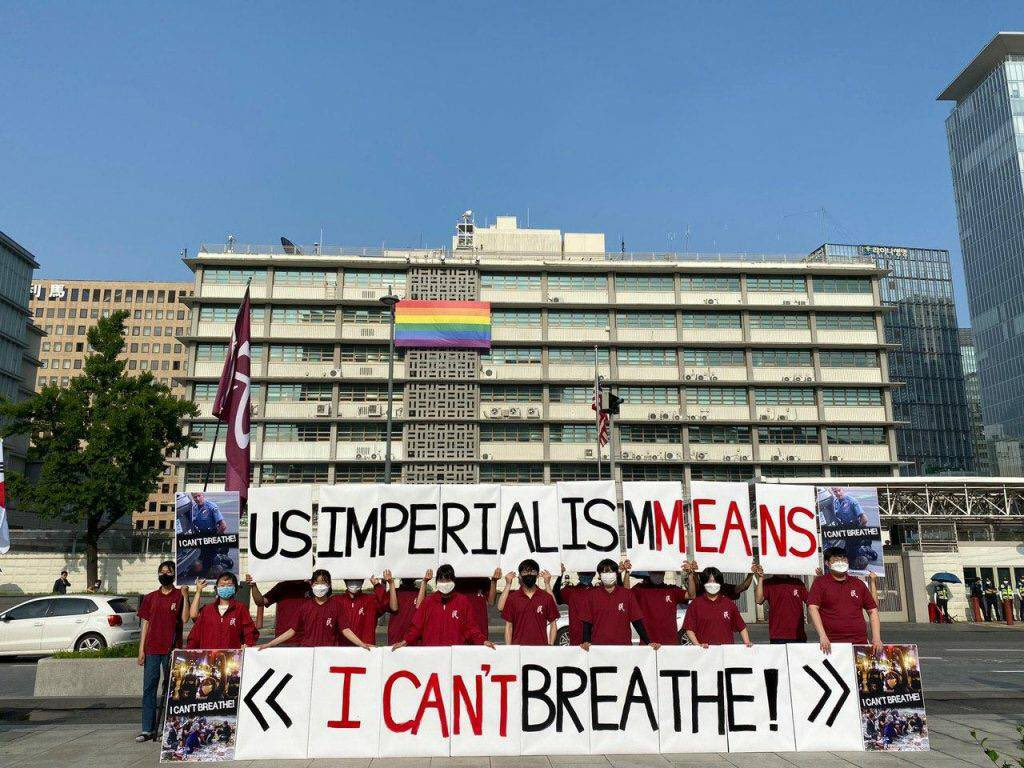
  Protest outside the US Embassy in Seoul, June 4
  - Seoul:
    - About a dozen people protested outside the US Embassy against the murder of George Floyd as well as against American imperialism.
    - Dozens of people protested near the US Embassy to seek justice for Floyd and denounce police brutality. Protestors also called on the South Korean government to enact an anti-discrimination law.
    - Around 150 people protested in Myeong-dong on June 6.
  - The protesters, who also sang "God Bless America", gathered June 4 at Osan Air Base on South Korea's west coast. On June 11, another demonstration was held at Camp Humphreys, about 60 miles south of the Demilitarized Zone separating North and South Korea.
- Taiwan:
  - Taipei:
    - On June 12, more than 100 people from the pro-Beijing Chinese Unification Promotion Party protested in front of the American Institute in Taiwan, (Note: Because Taiwan and the United States officially severed diplomatic ties in 1979, the Institute currently acts as a de facto embassy.) demonstrating against human rights violations in America, and calling on the United States government to respect ethnic minorities and release political prisoners. The crowd eventually dispersed peacefully.
    - On June 13, around 500 people congregated at 228 Peace Memorial Park to express their support of the international George Floyd protests. Participants sang songs in tribute to Floyd, and took a knee in solidarity.

=== South Asia ===
- India:
  - Kolkata: About 50 or 60 people of the Students Federation of India and Democratic Youth Federation of India protested peacefully outside the American Center on June 2.
- Pakistan:
  - Karachi: On June 5, members of the Pasban Democratic Party protested against the murder of Floyd while holding posters featuring his image.
- Sri Lanka:
  - Colombo: On June 9, 2020, about 100 people gathered in front of the US embassy for a peaceful protest organized by the Frontline Socialist Party seeking justice for Floyd. The day before, the police had obtained a court injunction prohibiting the gathering. Violence was used by the police to disperse the crowd and arrest 53 (Note: The police reported that 53 people were arrested, though sources vary on the number, with one source stating that as few as "[a]bout 10" had been arrested.) protestors for violating quarantine measures, with police being seen "throwing at least one woman into an open truck". The use of police brutality to arrest people protesting peacefully against police brutality was heavily criticized by political parties, civil rights organizations, and trade unions, and some organizations made a joint statement pointing out that "[b]y assaulting protesters who abided by quarantine laws while not taking action when government supporters violated quarantine law, police have clearly demonstrated their readiness to violate rights guaranteed by the constitution according to the bidding of the ruling party". (Note: Many had questioned why the police took no action during the funeral of Arumugam Thondaman, a cabinet minister whose funeral less than two weeks prior was attended by thousands, including Prime Minister Mahinda Rajapaksa, who was filmed hugging people and violating other quarantine measures.) The US Embassy added that they had not asked the police to stop the protest.

=== Southeastern Asia ===
- Indonesia:
  Papuans have been protesting for decades against how the Indonesian government has treated them. The use of police brutality against Papuan students resulted in a serious series of protests in 2019. Seven Papuans arrested the previous year, known as the "Balikpapan Seven", were given "surprisingly light jail terms on treason charges" (Note: Each received a sentence of either 10 or 11 months, while prosecutors had demanded sentences ranging from 5 to 17 years.) after the George Floyd protests began, possibly to avoid the unrest seen in American protests. (Note: One legal analyst pointed out that "[i]n essence, they were all sentenced to time served". One human rights representative considered it a "face-saving" move by the government so that the defendants did not go free.) Many drew parallels between the George Floyd protests and those of the Papuans, resulting in the trending of the hashtag #PapuanLivesMatter online (Note: Protests in Papua had previously subsided after a police ban on mass rallies and the enforcement of coronavirus controls, forcing activism online.) and people in George Floyd protests outside of Indonesia also expressing solidarity with the Papuans. Protestors also likened George Floyd with Obby Kogoya, a Papuan student living in Yogyakarta whose head was stepped on (Note: Kogoya was subject to other forms of inhumane treatment, but a photo of Kogoya's head being stepped on closely parallelled the video of Floyd having his neck being kneeled on, and was therefore highlighted during the George Floyd protests.) by an Indonesia policeman while he was lying face down on the ground as the police held his dorm under siege to prevent a peaceful protest.
  Journalists, both foreign and domestic, face heavy resistance from the Indonesian government when attempting to report events in Papua.
  - Surabaya: Papuan students protested. Students also called on the Indonesian government to free the Balikpapan Seven.
- Philippines:
  - Quezon City: On June 4, hundreds of people protesting in the University of the Philippines Diliman against the passing of the controversial Anti-Terrorism Bill in the Philippine Congress took a knee in solidarity with Black Lives Matter and the fight against police brutality.
  - Cebu City: On June 3, Tug-ani (@upcebutugani) invited activists to attend a scheduled protest in front of the University of the Philippines Cebu entrance against the Anti-Terrorism Bill and to show solidarity with protesters in Hong Kong against the National Security Law and the Black Lives Matter movement. The protest occurred on the morning of June 5 in which activists took a knee in solidarity with BLM while chanting against the signing of the upcoming Anti-Terror bill. Police clad in anti-riot gear and a SWAT team were called in to disperse the protest as it was against the enacted quarantine and social distancing protocols. After protesters refused to comply, both uniformed and non-uniformed policemen stormed the campus which is clear violation of the Sotto-Enrile Accord. Seven protesters and one bystander were arrested. On June 8, a local court ordered the release of the individuals being detained. The following day on June 9, the eight detainees were released without bail.
- Thailand:
  - Bangkok: Several Thai people in Bangkok who were protesting the suspected kidnapping of a Thai activist in Cambodia also held signs stating "I can't breathe", reflecting George Floyd's death and the disappearances of Thai activists.
  - Online: On June 7, approximately 300 Thais and foreigners in Thailand held a virtual protest on Zoom due to COVID-19 restrictions. Protesters wrote "I Can't Breathe" on their arms and observed silence for eight minutes 46 seconds.

=== Western Asia ===
- Armenia:
  - Yerevan: Around 25 people protested at the US Embassy on June 4. Some held papers listing names of Black Americans killed by police.
- Cyprus:
  - Nicosia: About 250 people peacefully protested outside the United States Embassy, denouncing "social and racial inequities" that victimized not only Floyd, but also "the poor and dispossessed irrespective of race, creed or color". Protesters took a knee and raised fists to show solidarity with American protestors.
- Georgia:
  - Tbilisi: Several dozen people protested at the Rustaveli Metro Station against racism and police brutality. A few counterprotestors were also present, with one stating that he was protesting because "the [other] protest was 'anti-white' and supported 'terrorism'". Two counterprotestors held a flag of the Democratic Republic of Georgia, the first modern republic of Georgia, and stated that they were protesting in support of US President Trump.

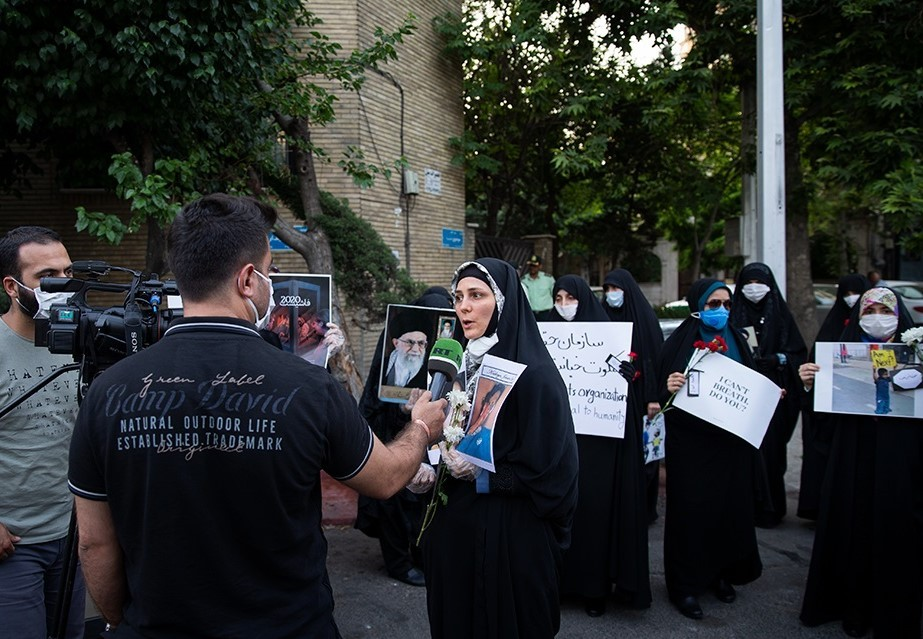
Protest in Tehran, June 3

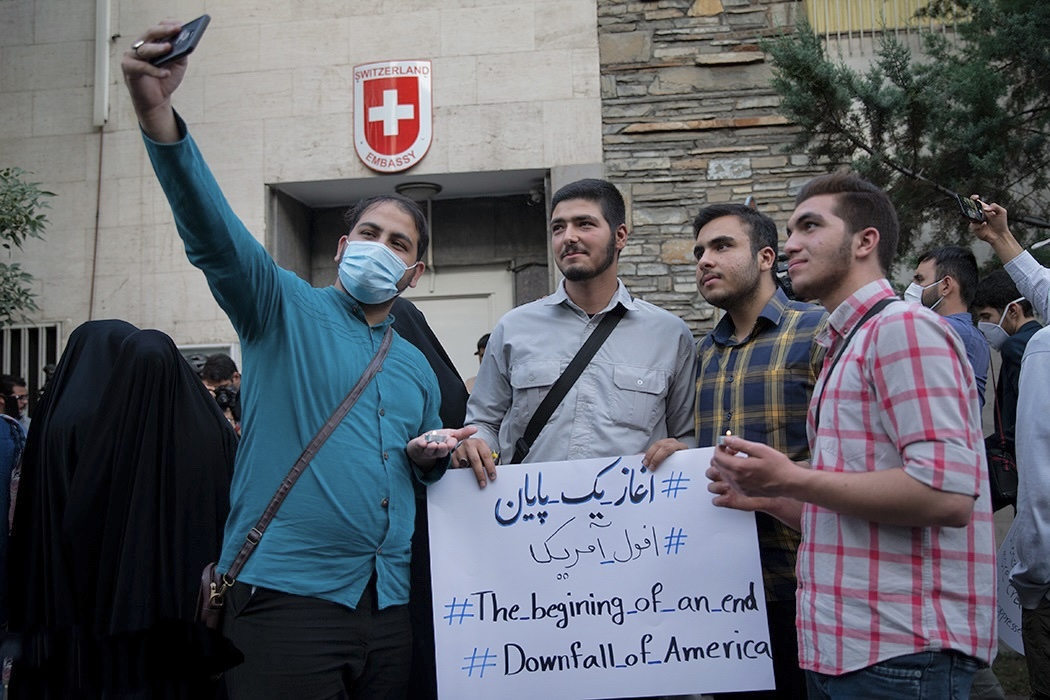
Protest in Tehran, June 3. #Downfall_of_America is visible in the photo.

- Iran:
  - Mashhad: A candlelight vigil was held for Floyd in Mellat Park.
  - Tehran: Protesters in Tehran held up signs saying "Justice for George Floyd", "I Can't Breathe" and Black Lives Matter.
- Israel:
  - Jerusalem: On May 30, over 150 people protested against the murder of Floyd and Iyad Halak, an unarmed autistic Palestinian student who was shot and killed by police in Jerusalem.
  - Tel Aviv: Over 200 people protested against the murder of Floyd and Iyad Halak outside police headquarters on May 30. On June 2, hundreds of people protested on a beach. On June 6, another peaceful protest was held at Rabin Square.
  - Haifa: Hundreds marched in Haifa protesting police violence against Floyd, Halak, and Solomon Teka, an Ethiopian-Israeli shot by Israeli police in 2019, in an incident which had sparked protests by Israel's Ethiopian community.
- Lebanon:
  - Beirut: Dozens of people held a vigil for Floyd in front of the American University of Beirut. Attendees also protested against the kafala system in Lebanon, in which migrant workers are exploited by their employers, and their passports are often confiscated. Other instances of racism in Lebanon were also criticized, such as the actions of Lebanese singer Tania Saleh, who posted a picture of herself in blackface in what she claimed was solidarity with those demanding racial equality, even though she would not take it down after significant backlash, choosing instead to defend herself.
- Turkey:
  - Ankara: People protested in front of the US Embassy against racism and the murder of Floyd. One organization invited the US government to end the violation of human rights.
  - Istanbul: About 50 people protested in Kadıköy, on the Asian side of Istanbul, against police brutality, standing in solidarity with American protestors and carrying a poster of George Floyd. Police dispersed the group and detained at least 29 protestors.

== Europe ==
=== Eastern Europe ===
- Bulgaria:
  - Sofia: Several hundred people protested peacefully on Vitosha Boulevard on June 6, chanting "I can't breathe" and holding signs stating "Black Lives Matter".
- Czechia:
  - Prague: Around 300 people gathered at the Old Town Square on June 6. Protesters then peacefully marched to the US Embassy. About 4000 people had shown interest in the event before it was cancelled in order to comply with the restrictions due to the COVID-19 pandemic in the Czech Republic that allowed gatherings up to 500 people. After the cancellation, Minister of the Interior Jan Hamáček stated that the limit did not apply to demonstrations.
- Hungary:
  - Budapest: Over a thousand people protested at the US Embassy on June 7. On June 16, the bust of Winston Churchill in the City Park was vandalised with the words "Nazi" and "BLM". A couple of hundred people held a protest against racism at the US Embassy on June 20. Far-right groups, such as the Sixty-Four Counties Youth Movement tried to disturb the event, but after police intervention, the situation did not escalate.
- Poland:
  - Gdańsk: About 200 people protested peacefully at Town Hall on Ulica Długa in solidarity with American protestors.
  - Kraków: On June 7, about a thousand people gathered to march in Floyd's memory and to protest racism and police brutality. The march commenced in front of the US Consulate General on Stolarska Street and ended at Little Market Square.
  - Poznań: Protestors dressed in black and marched quietly from Freedom Square to the US Consular Agency and then to Adam Mickiewicz Square, where some protestors laid on the ground, assuming the same position in which Floyd died.
  - Warsaw: Several hundred people (Note: One source stated that thousands attended the protest.) gathered on Ujazdów Avenue in front of the US Embassy to peacefully protest against the killing of Floyd, racism, and police brutality. Many dressed in black and chose to kneel. A spokesperson for the Varsovian police stated that the assembly was legal and prior notice had been given.
- Romania
  - Bucharest: On June 6, over a dozen protesters assembled in University Square for a brief demonstration and reading of grievances condemning police brutality and inequality. The protest lasted only a few minutes and ended before police could arrive.
- Russia:
  - Moscow: Two people went to the US Embassy to protest with a banner that sought justice for Floyd, demanded an end to fascism, and insulted the police. The two were detained by police shortly after they had set the banner up.
- Slovakia:
  - Bratislava: Around 100 people gathered on June 1 near the US Embassy at Hviezdoslav Square in peaceful protest, wearing face masks.
- Ukraine:
  - Ternopil: A few students, many of them Black, held a peaceful anti-racism protest on Chornovil Street. (Note: According to some, the event was not a protest, but a "photo shoot" (фотосесія).)

=== Northern Europe ===
- Denmark:
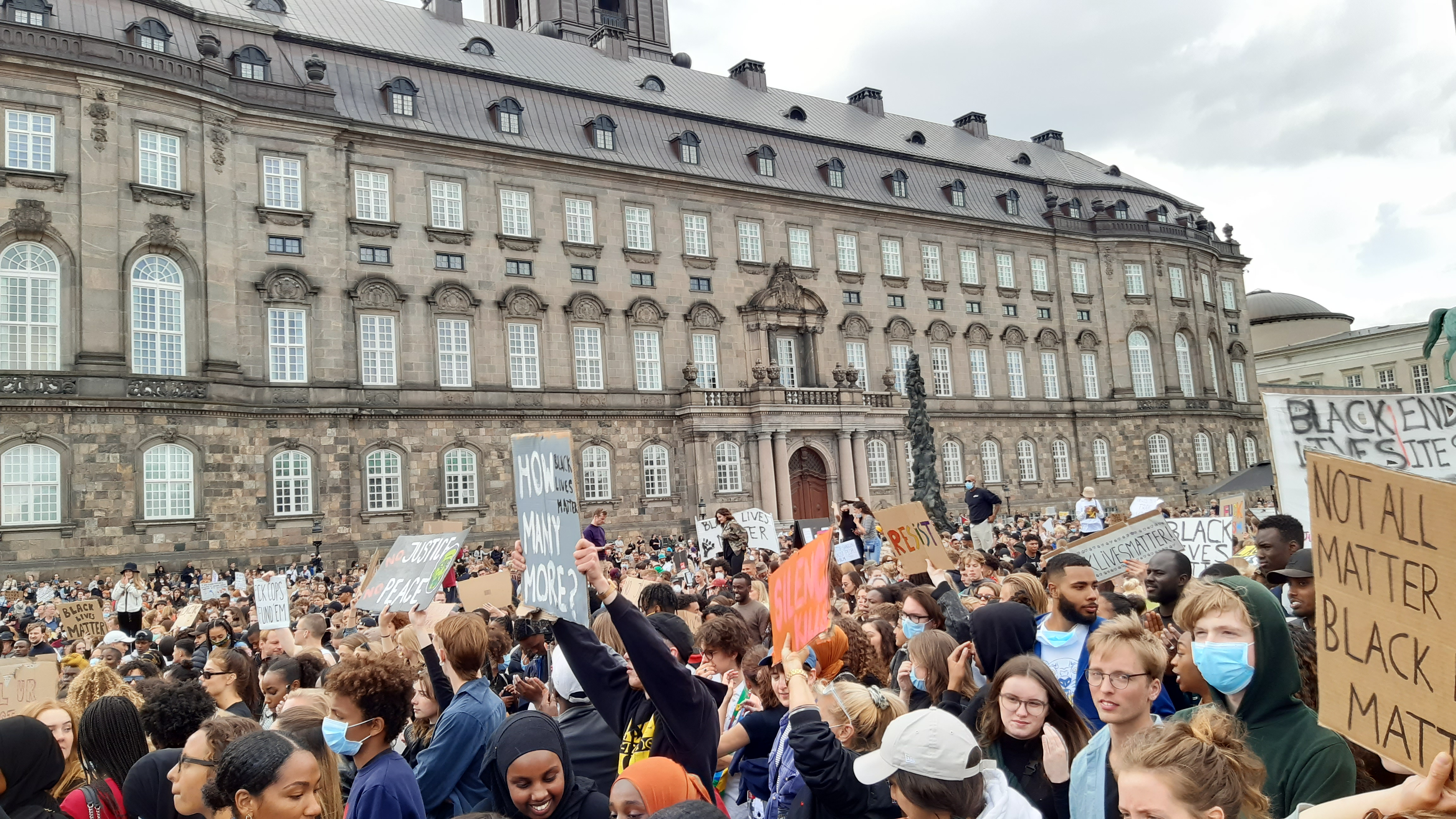
  Demonstration on Christiansborg Slotsplads, Copenhagen, June 7
  - Aalborg: Around 500 people marched through the city in a peaceful protest on June 9.
  - Aarhus: Around 2,500 people gathered at the City Hall Square for a peaceful protest on June 3.
  - Copenhagen: Around 2,000 people gathered in front of the US Embassy for a peaceful protest on May 31, followed by another with more than 15,000 people on June 7. They happened during the COVID-19 pandemic, when there were restrictions on the size of gatherings in Denmark, but demonstrations were explicitly exempt from these rules. The authorities recommended that everybody that had attended should request a test, which is free and easy in Denmark, and not dependent on one having symptoms.
  - Odense: Around 300 people gathered for a peaceful protest on June 10.
- Estonia:
  - Tallinn: Around 500 people gathered in Tallinn for a peaceful Black Lives Matter protest on June 10, despite the social distancing measures being set at maximum 100 people.
- Faroe Islands:
  - Tórshavn: Hundreds of people gathered in the capital to protest against racism and police brutality on June 9. One of the organizers stated that many from the Faroe Islands would not acknowledge the existence of racism on the islands.
- Finland:
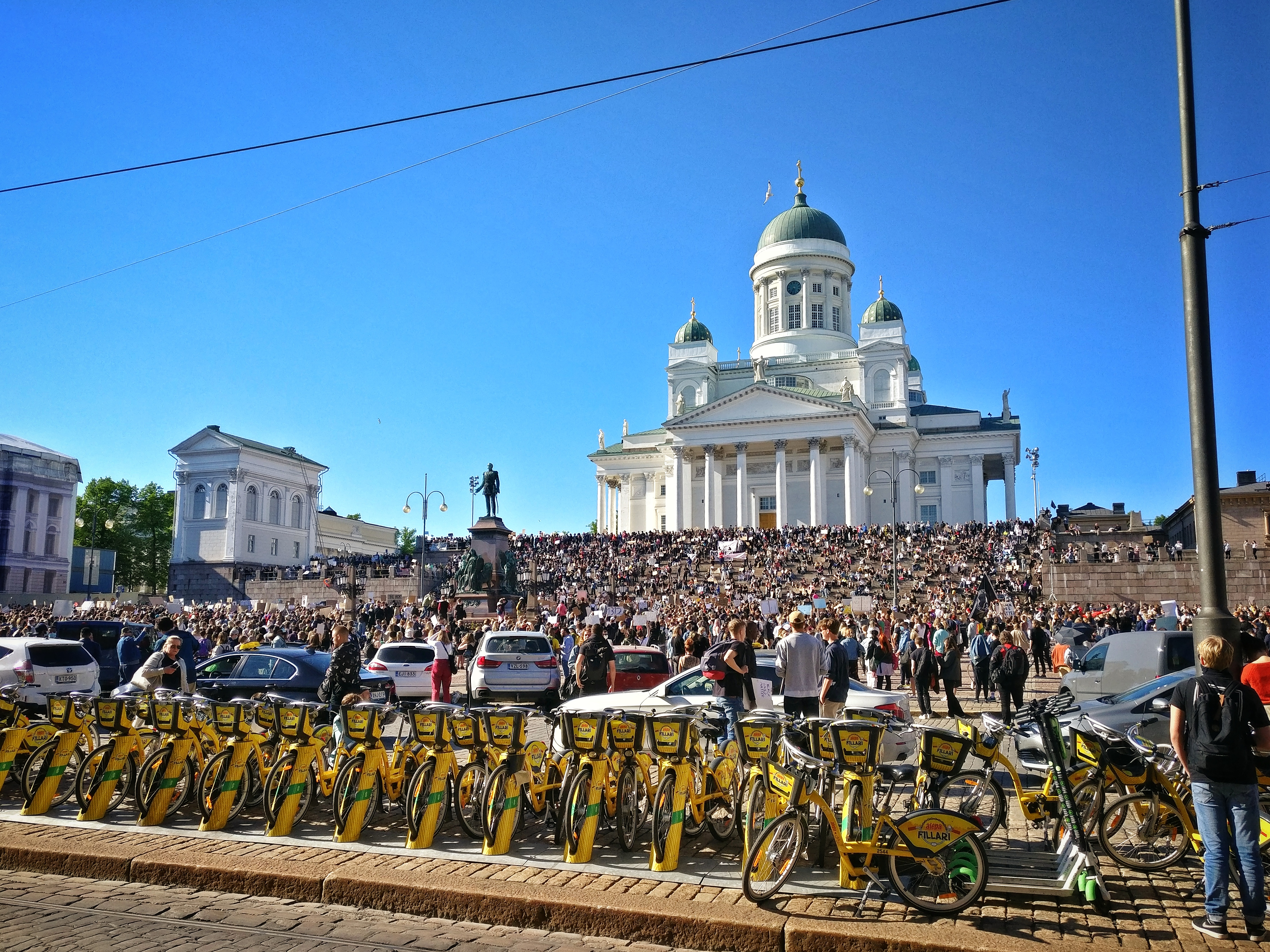
  Protest in Helsinki, June 3
  - Helsinki: Around 3,000 people gathered at Senate Square for a peaceful protest on June 3.
- Guernsey:
  - Saint Peter Port: About a thousand people attended a peaceful rally on June 20. Near the end they knelt for 8 minutes 46 seconds. There were no COVID-19 cases on the island at the time; the rally was originally scheduled for June 13, but was rescheduled to be held on the day the island came out of lockdown.
- Iceland:
  - Ísafjörður: About 100 people gathered at the centre of town for a solidarity meeting. People observed 8 minutes 46 seconds of silence before the meeting began.
  - Reykjavík: Between 3,500 and 5,000 people protested in Austurvöllur square on June 3, in the largest gathering in Iceland since public gatherings were first banned due to the pandemic. The protestors also observed 8 minutes 46 seconds of silence. Protestors stated that although police brutality was not an issue in Iceland, racism still was.
- Ireland:
  - Cork: June 4: Cork City Council opened an online book of condolences for citizens to express their sympathies to the family of George Floyd. June 5: Around 300 protesters marched from Kent Station down Patrick Street to Grand Parade.
  - Dingle: June 8 : About 150 people held a peaceful demonstration on Main Street Dingle led by indie pop band Walking on Cars.
  - Dublin: May 31: About 100 people held a peaceful demonstration outside the US Embassy in Dublin. On June 1, thousands of marchers gathered again in Dublin to continue protests.
  - Galway: June 6: Hundreds of protesters gathered in Eyre Square to support Black Lives Matter. Speakers at the event also called for Ireland to end its direct provision system.
  - Kilkenny: June 3: Around 100 people took part in a vigil outside the Tholsel in honor of George Floyd. June 8: Over 150 people marched through the streets in an anti-racism rally to the Parade, where a silent vigil was held.
  - Limerick: June 6: More than 250 protesters met at Arthur Quay's Park to share their experiences about racism in Ireland, even though the organizers officially moved the event online for social distancing reasons during the COVID-19 pandemic.
  - Waterford: June 6: Hundreds of people marched from the Clock Tower to the Waterford Courthouse in an anti-racism protest.
- Isle of Man:
  - Douglas: June 9: More than 1000 protesters marched on the seafront before taking a knee in silence for just under 9 minutes. At the time, there were no known active cases of coronavirus on the island.
- Lithuania:
  - Vilnius: Around 1,000 people marched from the Cathedral square to the US embassy on June 5.
- Norway:
  - Bergen: A gathering consisting of a couple of hundred protestors took place in the city center of Bergen on June 5.
  - Kristiansand: Several hundred people met in the Kristiansand city center to protest police brutality on June 5.
  - Oslo: On June 5, at least a thousand protestors marched from the US Embassy to the Norwegian Parliament where a larger gathering also took place. All in all, several thousand participants from at least three different protests were gathered at the most. The assistant director of the Norwegian Directorate for Health and Social Affairs expressed his concerns regarding the protest due to the elevated risk of COVID-19 infection. Nevertheless, the police stated in advance that both they and the population in general put freedom of speech at a high value, and that they therefore would not stop the protest. They also stated that they were not there to be an "infection control police", but rather to maintain peace and order amongst the protestors.
  - Tromsø: Although the official protest in Tromsø was cancelled due to the COVID-19 infection risk, several hundred people were gathered in the city center on June 5 to show solidarity towards the victims of racism and police brutality in both the US, Norway and the rest of the world alike.
- Sweden:
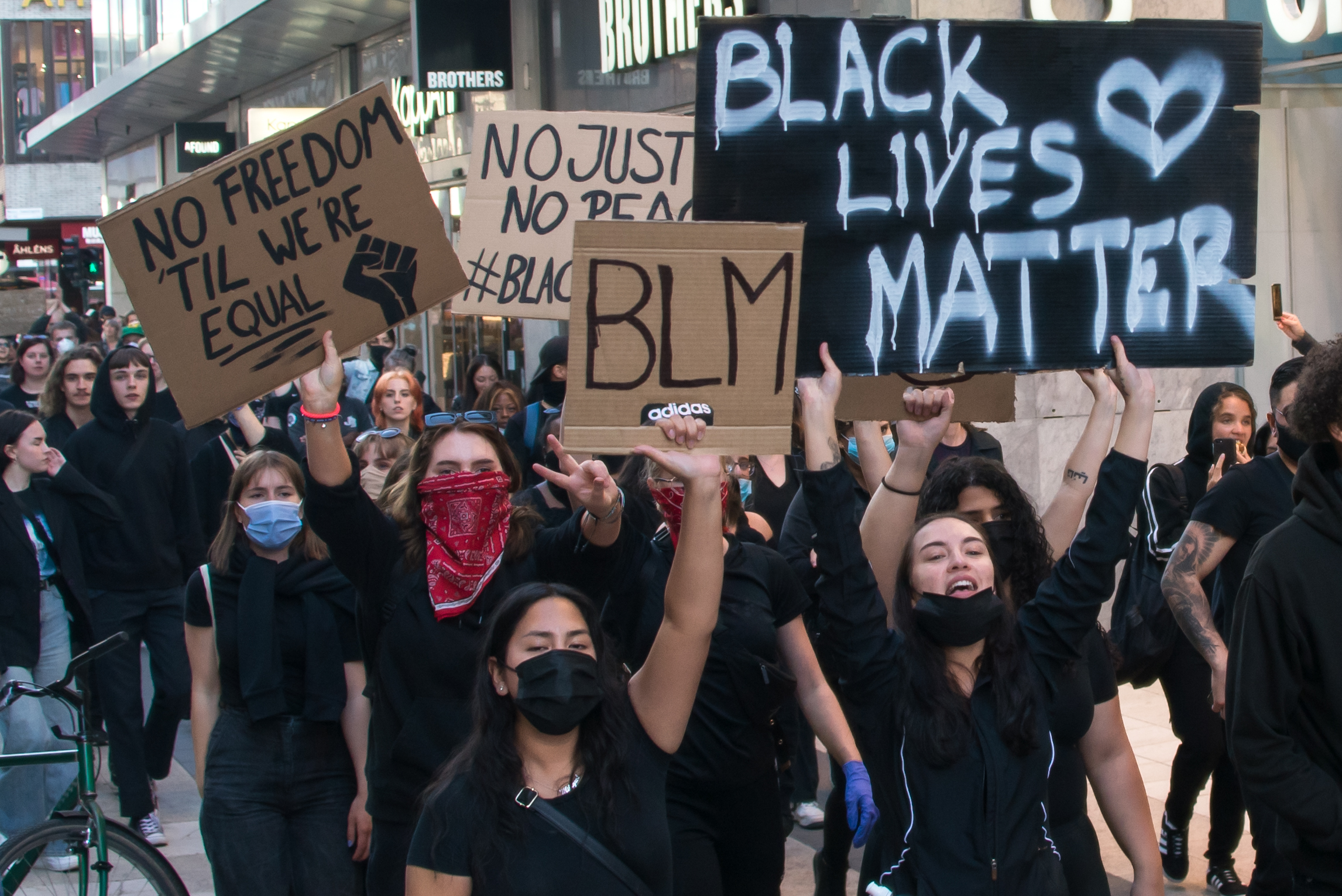
  Protest in Stockholm on June 3
  - Gothenburg: Around 3000 people gathered in Heden to protest against racism on June 7. Due to the coronavirus pandemic, the police shut the event down, so the protesters walked around the city instead.
  - Malmö: Thousands of people gathered in Ribersborg to protest against racism on June 4. Due to the coronavirus pandemic, the police tried to shut the event down, but were unsuccessful.
  - Örebro: More than 400 people gathered in Stortorget to protest against racism on June 5.
  - Stockholm: Thousands of people gathered in Sergels torg to protest against racism in solidarity with Black Lives Matter on June 3. Due to the coronavirus pandemic, the police shut the event down, so the protesters walked around the city instead. Protests became heated at times, as the police used tear gas against the protesters.
  - Umeå: Over 50 people demonstrated in the city center on June 4. Over 300 gathered for a second protest in Broparken on June 6. The police allowed the protest to proceed, but arrested two counter-protestors who tried to start a fight with the protestors.

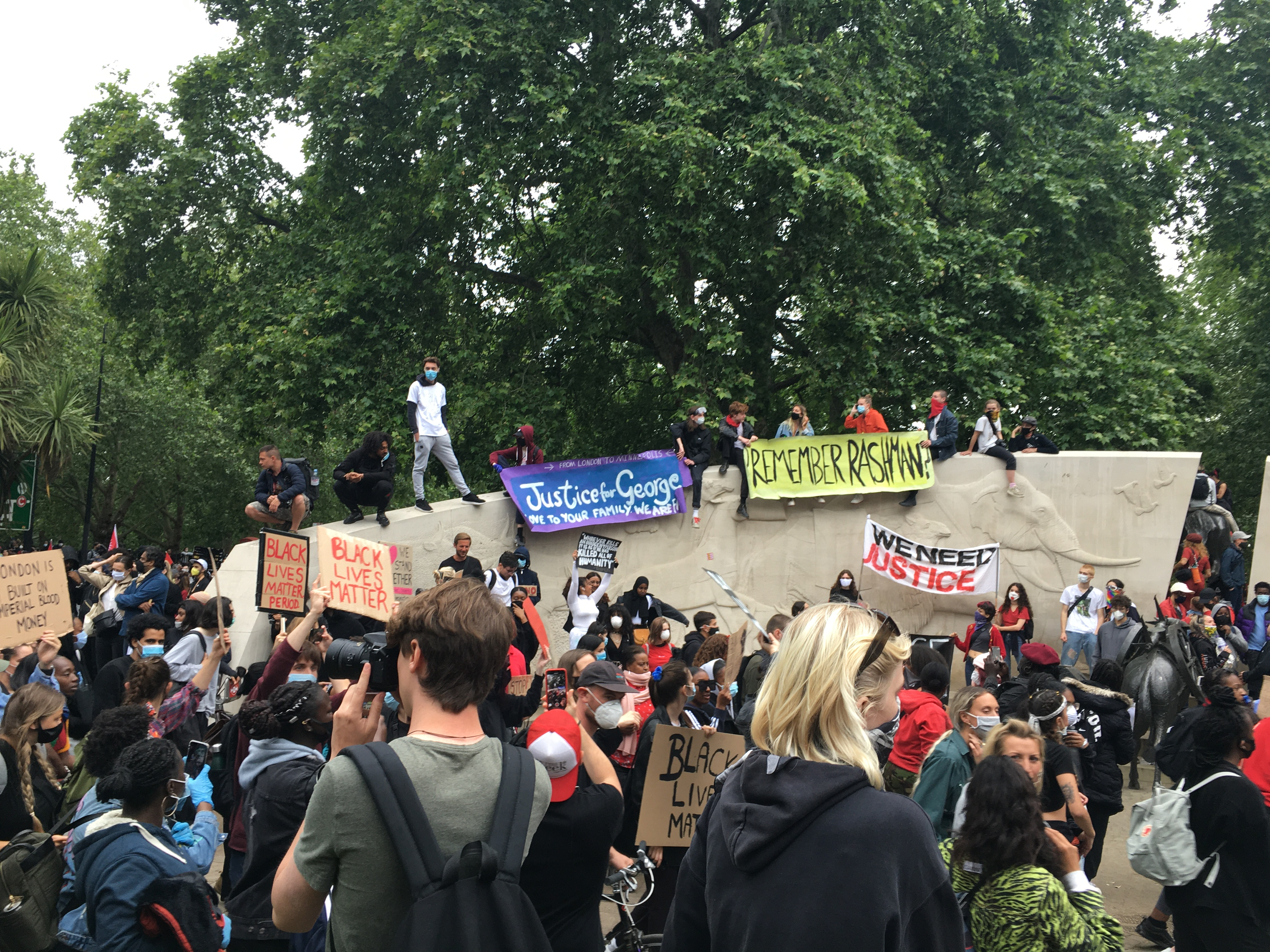
Protest at Hyde Park in London on June 3

- United Kingdom:

Starting on May 28, protests arose in nearly all major cities across the United Kingdom, including Birmingham, Liverpool, London, Manchester and Newcastle. Many protests were organized by the Black Lives Matter and Stand Up to Racism movements. As well as providing solidarity to protests in the United States, many of the ongoing protests in the United Kingdom intended to highlight issues with racism faced from law enforcement in the United Kingdom and in daily life, as well as highlighting wider non-racial issues of police corruption and brutality. The UK city of Bristol made international headlines after protestors pulled down the statue of Edward Colston, a famous Bristolian slave owner. Health Secretary Matt Hancock urged people not to attend large gatherings, including protests, as temporary regulations in response to the COVID-19 pandemic prohibited public gatherings of greater than 6 people.

=== Southern Europe ===
- Andorra:
  - Andorra la Vella: About a hundred demonstrators gathered in General Council Square to protest against racism on June 7. Protestors observed a minute of silence, and a manifesto denouncing the spread of racism was read.
- Croatia:
  - Zagreb: Some 400 people protested peacefully at Victims of Fascism Square in Zagreb, on June 9, 2020.
- Greece
  - Athens: June 1: About 300 supporters of the Greek Communist Party's youth wing marched and demonstrated outside the US Embassy in Athens. On June 3, another demonstration was held with 3,000 protesters participating where they gathered at Syntagma Square and marched towards the US Embassy peacefully, while some demonstrators were throwing Molotov cocktails towards riot police during the march towards the US Embassy.
  - Thessaloniki: June 2: A group of protesters peacefully marched to the US Consulate in the center of the city to show solidarity with the protesters and victims of racism and police violence in the United States. Protesters also burned an American flag in front of the consulate.

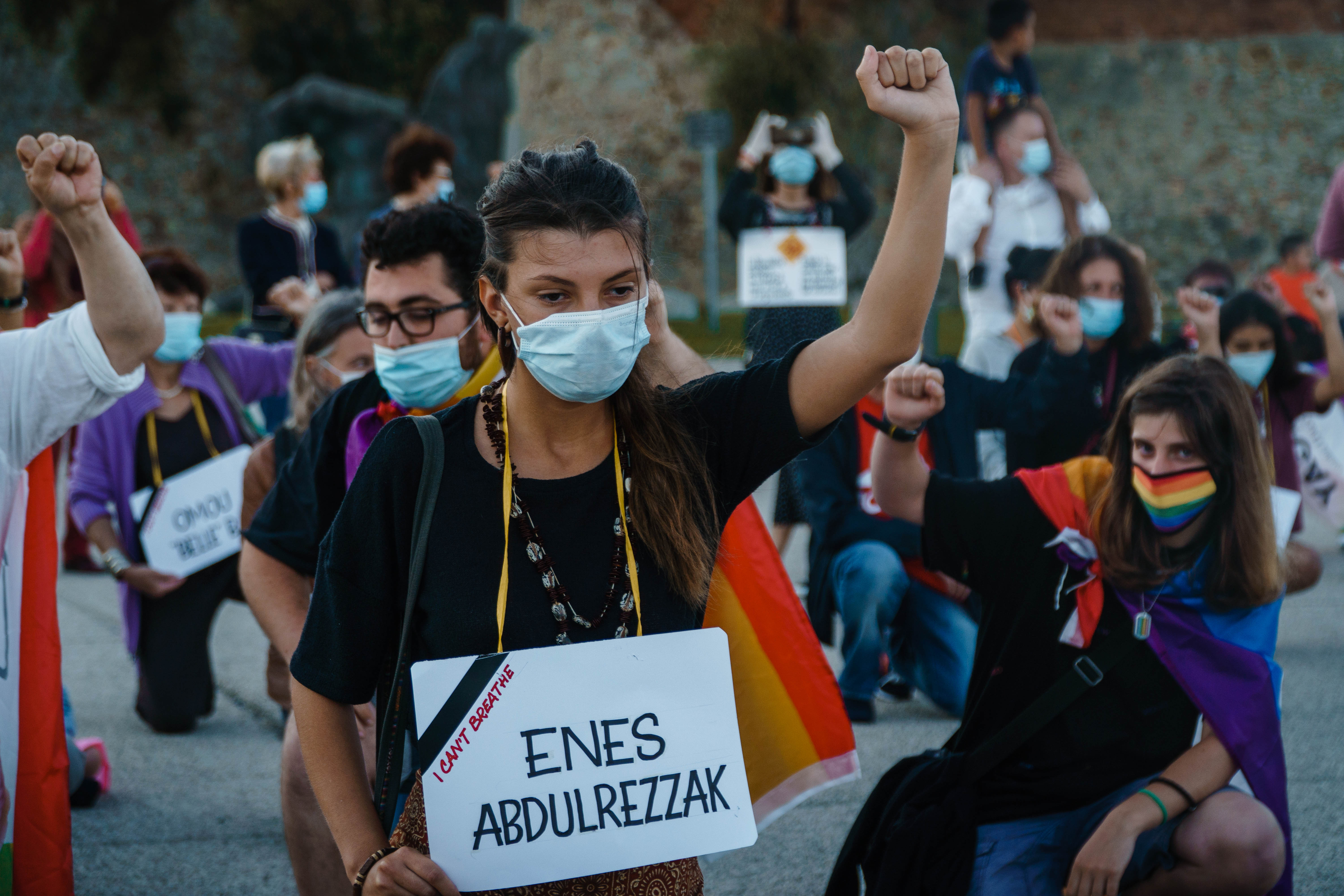
Protestors taking a knee and raising their fists in Sanremo on 20 June

- Italy:

Starting on May 28, protests arose in nearly all major cities across Italy, including Milan, Naples, Florence, Rome and Bari. Many protests were organized by Black Lives Matter and many Italian associations. As well as providing solidarity to protests in the United States, many of the ongoing protests in Italy intend to highlight issues with racism faced from law enforcement in Italy and in daily life, as well as highlighting wider non-racial issues of police corruption and brutality.

- Kosovo:
  - Pristina: People protested near the US Embassy, taking a knee and raising their fists.
- Malta:
  - Valletta/Floriana: About 300 people gathered in front of Parliament House in an anti-racism protest on June 8. The protests showed solidarity with the Black Lives Matter movement and called for justice for the murder of Lassana Cisse, a racially motivated murder of an Ivorian man in Malta in 2019. The anti-racism protesters were confronted by a group of anti-immigration protesters. The anti-racism protestors took a knee and observed a minute of silence while the anti-immigration protestors booed.
- Montenegro:
  - Podgorica: About 100 people peacefully protested in solidarity with the international George Floyd protests, marching through the city and taking a knee at Independence Square. Protestors also wished to highlight the racism present in their own country.
- Portugal:
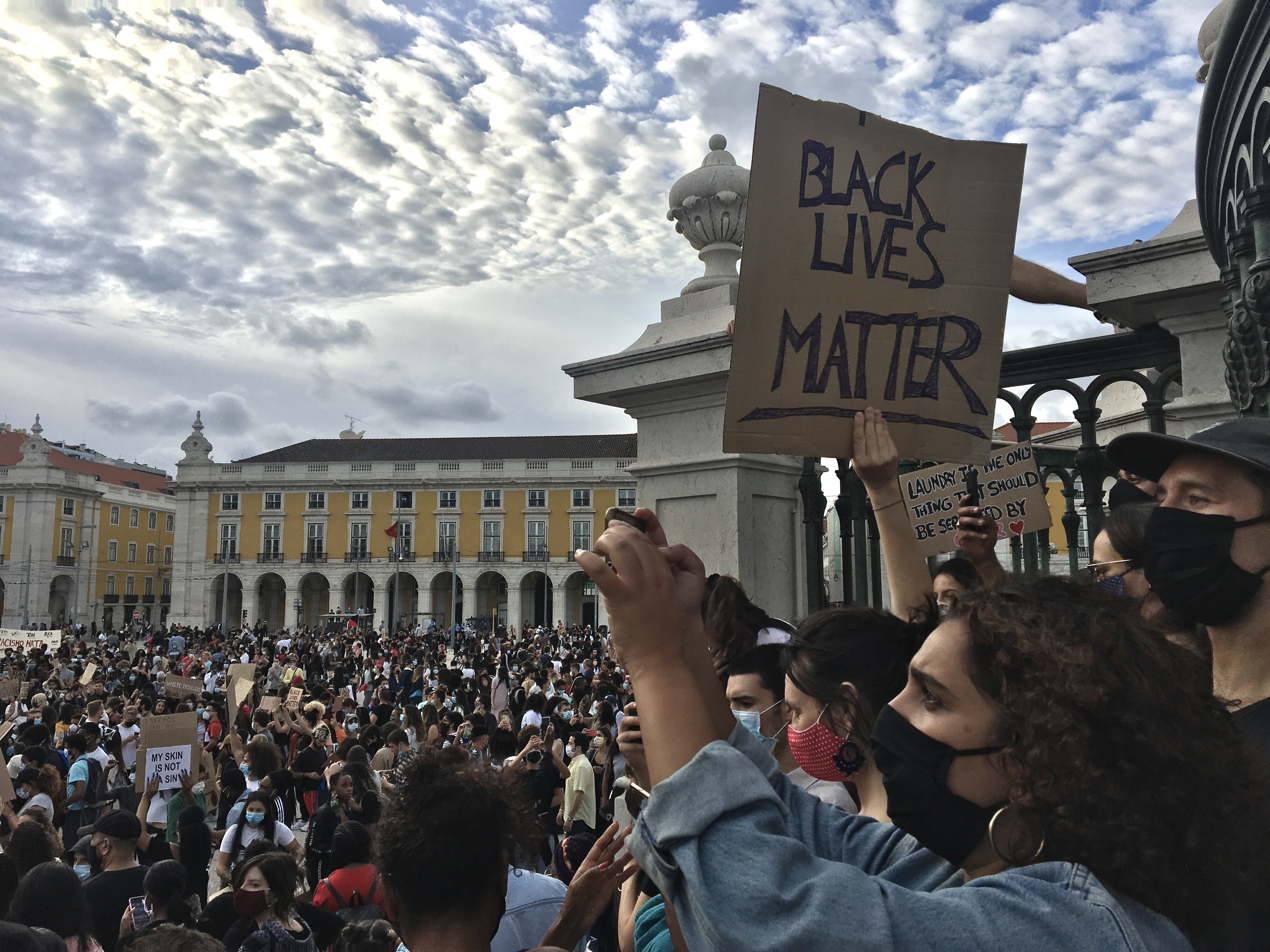
  Protest in Lisbon on June 6
  - Coimbra: on June 6, hundreds of people gathered in Praça da República to protest peacefully against the murder of George Floyd and for the Black Lives Matter movement.
  - Lisbon: on June 6, about 10,000 people gathered in Alameda D. Afonso Henriques and marched down Avenida Almirante Reis in a peaceful manner, echoing chants to remember George Floyd as well as local victims of racism and police brutality, like Cláudia Simões and Kuku, ending the demonstration in Terreiro do Paço. It was organized by a platforme of organizations, from black and antiracism collectives, to antifascists, students, environmental, feminists organizations.
  - Porto: on June 6, about 1000 people protested peacefully in Avenida dos Aliados against the murder of George Floyd and racism in Portugal and Brazil.
- Serbia:
  - Belgrade: Members of the Women in Black organization in Belgrade (Note: The Serbian organization is a self-described "Women's Feminist - Antimilitarist Peace Organization" that lists nonviolence as one of their core values.) protested on Knez Mihailova Street at Republic Square. The group sought justice for Floyd and other victims of murders based on racism, as well as the end of the use of force by police against protestors. In addition, the organization requested that further militarization not be used against the protestors, and that criminalization of the Antifa protests and protestors be stopped.

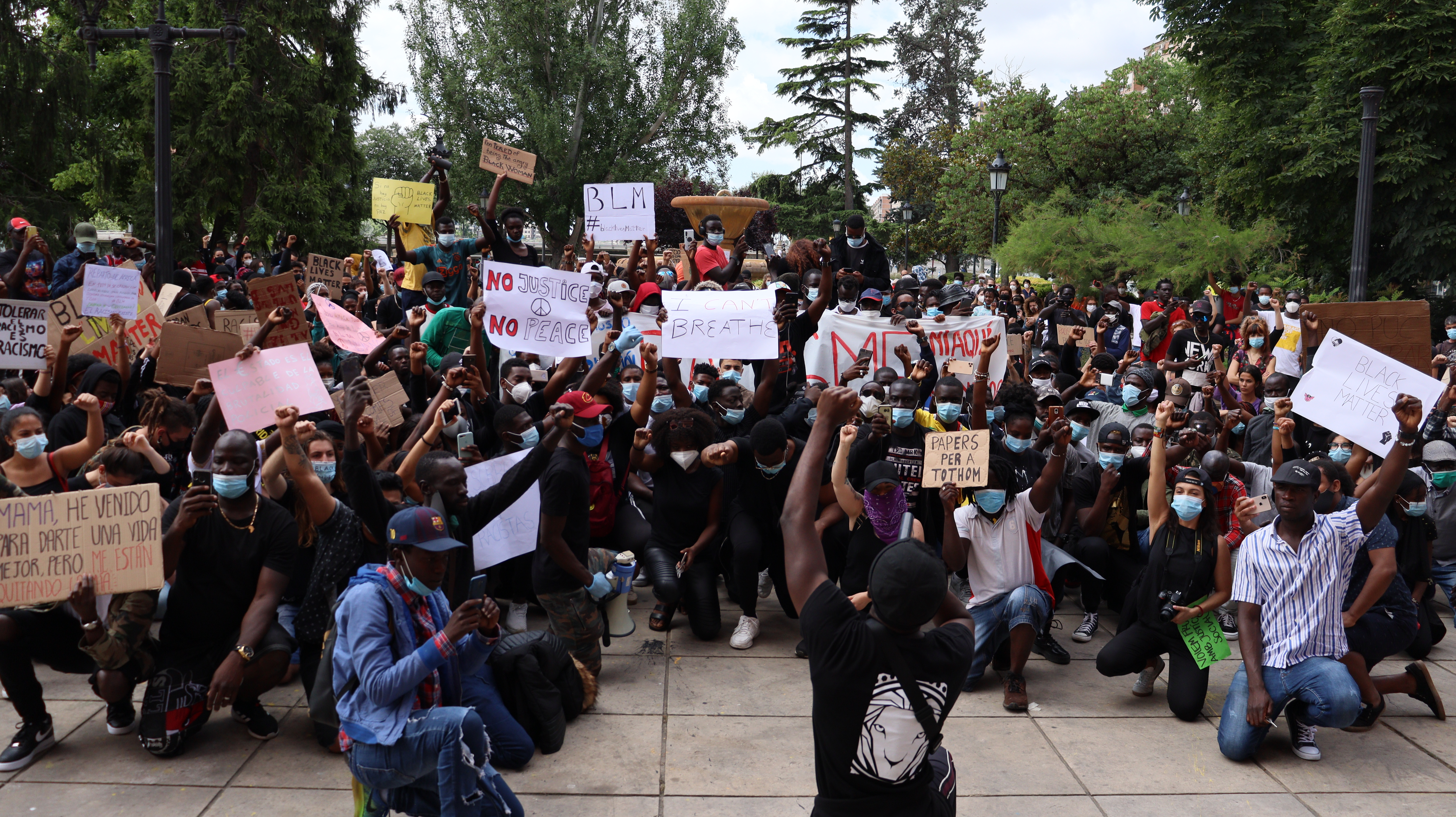
Demonstration in Lleida on June 7

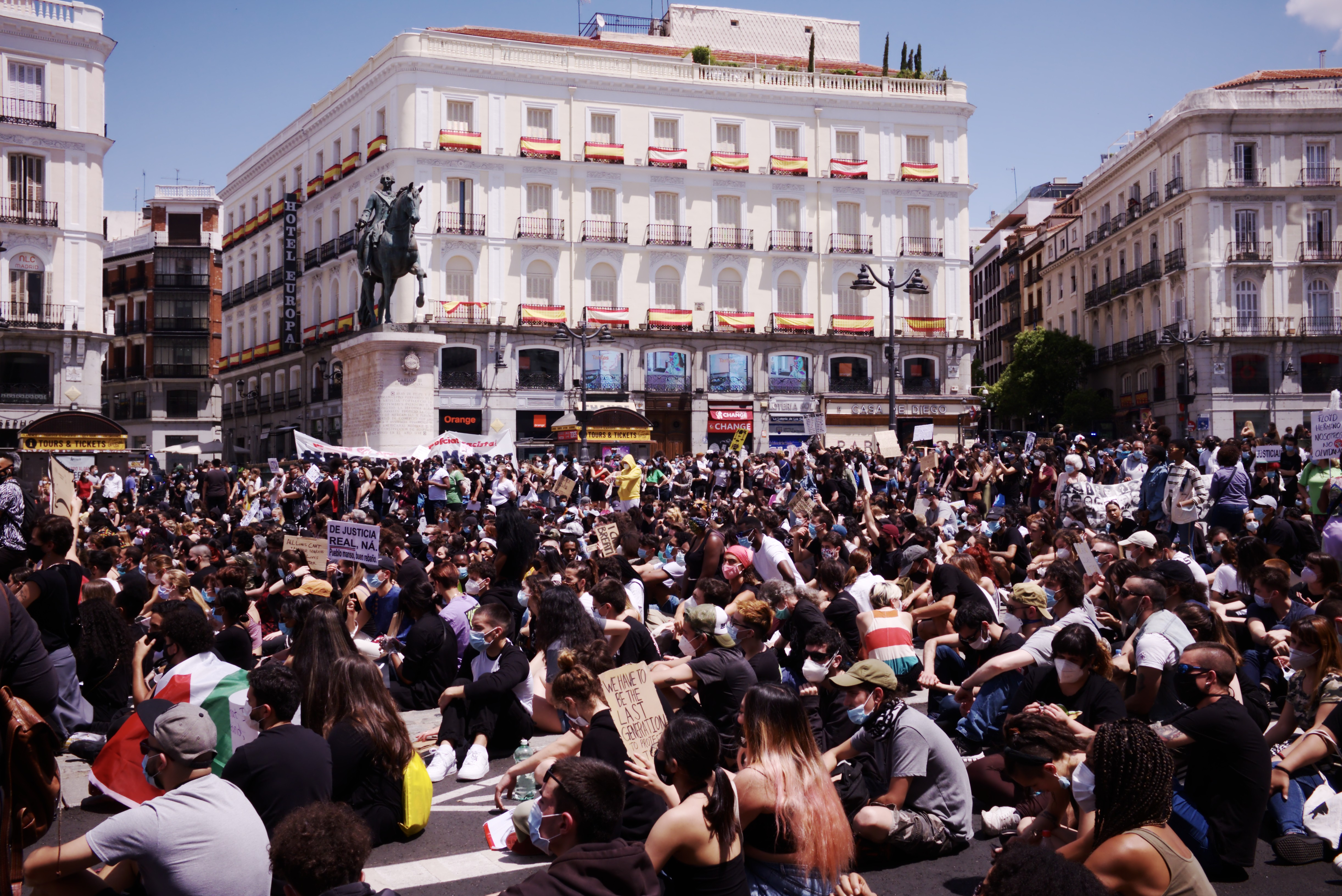
Puerta del Sol in Madrid on 7 June

- Spain:
  - Barcelona: Over 350 people protested outside the American Consulate General on June 1. A second demonstration took place on June 7, beginning at the Plaça Sant Jaume.
  - Bilbao: A demonstration on June 7.
  - Canary Islands: Demonstration scheduled for June 14.
  - Lleida: 600 people protested on June 7 in memory of George Floyd and to demand better conditions for farmworkers (mostly immigrants).
  - Madrid: On June 7, hundreds of demonstrators surrounded the US Embassy to protest the murder of George Floyd. The attendance exceeded the number of 200 authorized in advance by the Government Delegation (reportedly at least tenfold). The demonstration was organized by the Comunidad Negra, Africana y Afrodescendiente de España (CNAAE) and it also protested against the deaths in the southern border of Spain and the death of Mame Mbaye, a street vendor who died in Madrid in 2018 after a police raid.
  - Murcia: On June 7, hundreds of people gathered near the Plaza de la Merced to honor George Floyd and denounce police brutality.
  - Palma de Mallorca: A demonstration on June 7, with an estimated 800–1,000 protestors in attendance.
  - Salt: 500 people read a manifesto and marched to nearby Girona on June 1, and 300 marched in a second protest on June 7.
  - Sitges: A demonstration on June 7.
  - Tarragona: More than 500 people demonstrated on June 7.
  - Vilafranca del Penedès: More than 100 people demonstrated on June 7.
  - Zaragoza: Around 200 people demonstrated on June 2.
- Turkey:
  - Ankara: Police arrested 15 people for demonstrating in front of the US Embassy in Ankara.
  - Istanbul: About 20 people protested outside Trump Towers Istanbul in Şişli, on the European side of Istanbul, with about the same number of police officers in riot gear standing nearby. Protestors took a knee and raised their fists in solidarity.
  - İzmir: The Afro-Turk Association organized a march and rally in the port city to call attention to racial injustice and to raise awareness about the history of the African slave trade in the Ottoman Empire that can be traced back to the 14th century.

=== Western Europe ===
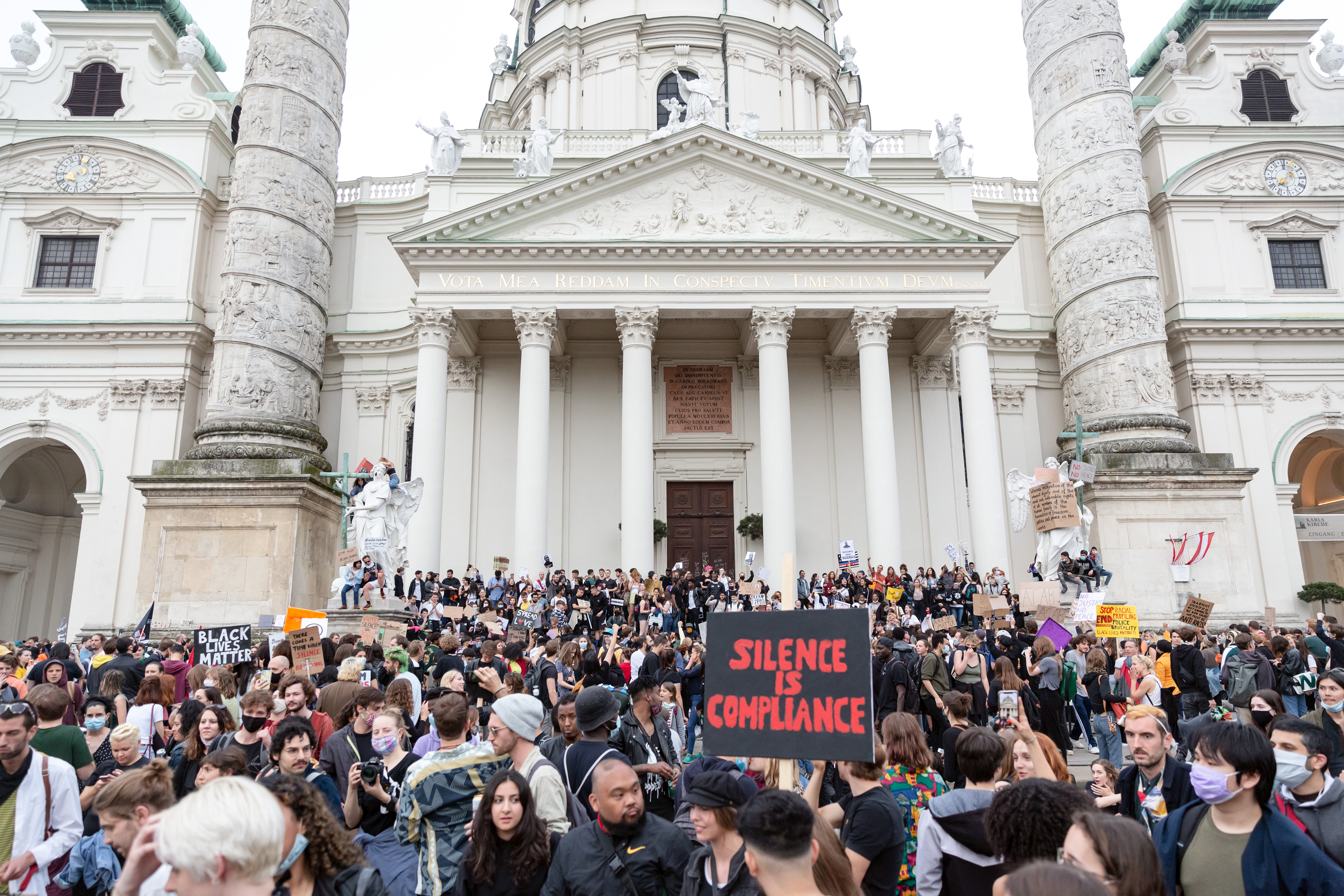
Black Lives Matter rally in Vienna on June 4

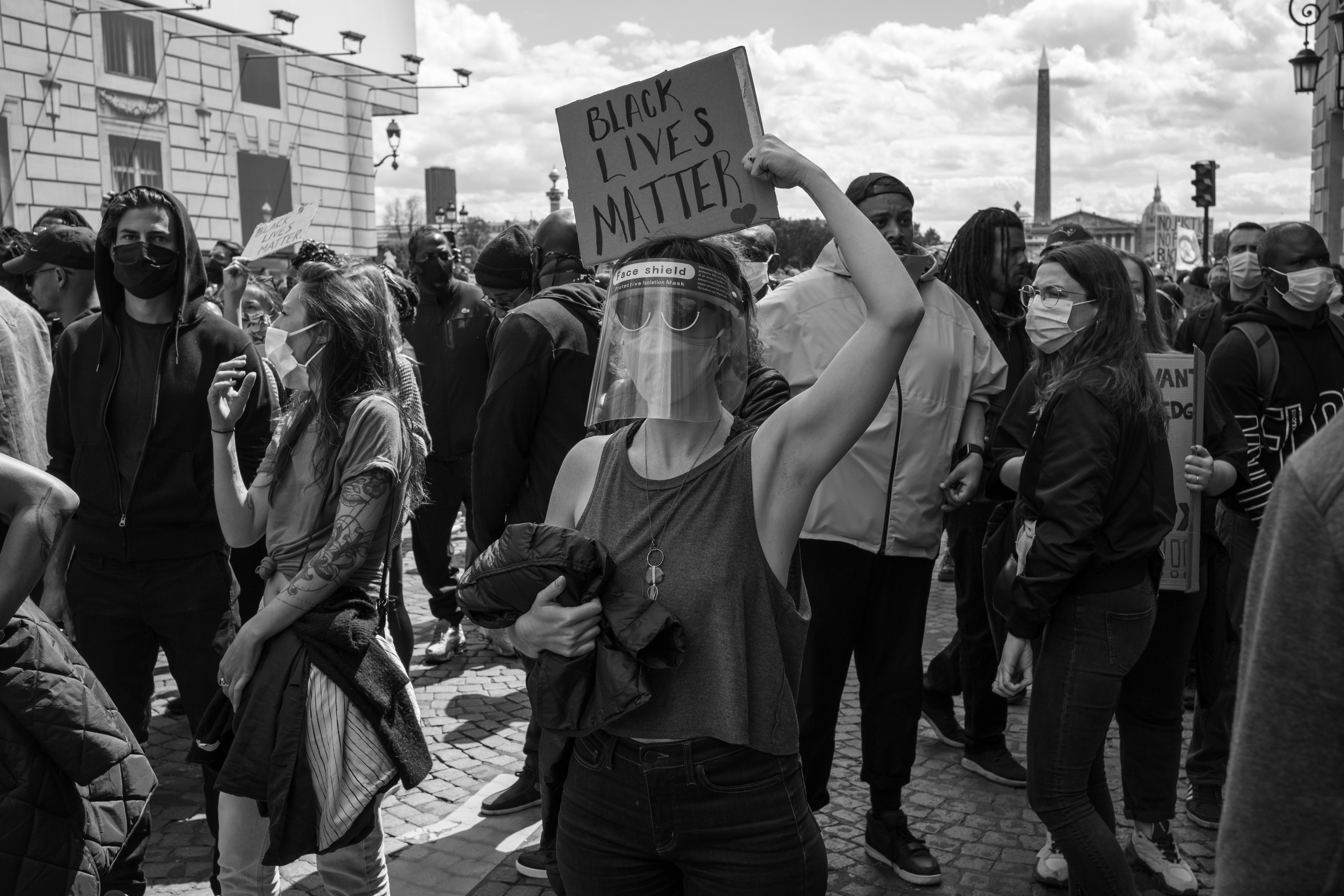
Black Lives Matter protest in Paris on June 6

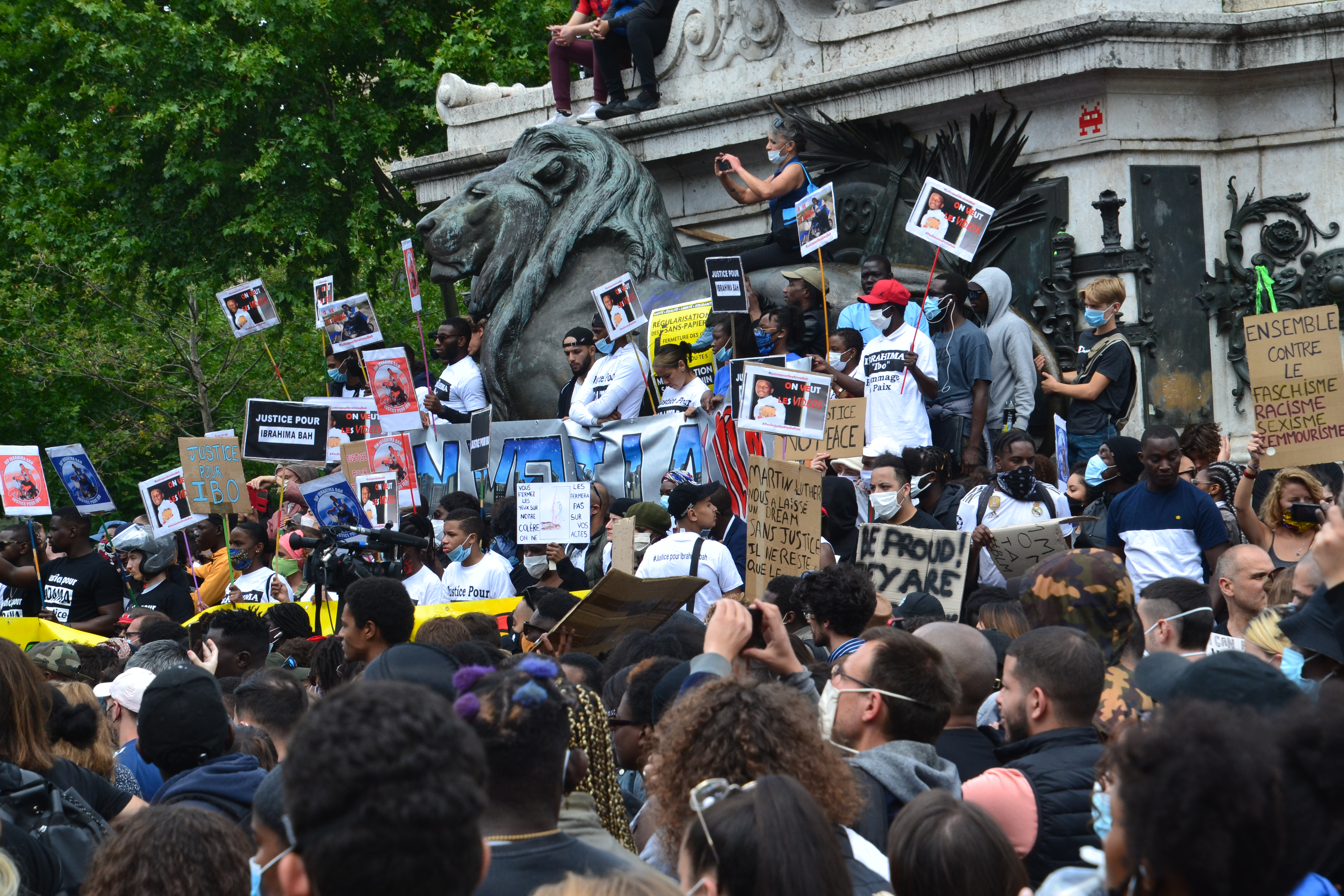
Protestors in Paris on 13 June at Place de la République

- Austria:
  - Vienna: About 50,000 mostly young demonstrators protested peacefully in a march to Karlsplatz on June 4.
- Belgium:

People in Belgium protested to show solidarity with Americans and to demonstrate against issues with police or racism. Vigils and protests of up to thousands of participants took place nationwide. Around 10,000 demonstrators came to the protest in Brussels.

- France:
  In 2016, Adama Traoré, a 24-year-old Malian French man, died by asphyxiation while in police custody. In response, protestors in France had been seeking justice for him (Note: In contrast with Floyd, he is generally referred to by his first name, such as in the phrase "Justice pour Adama".) since 2016. When a police investigation exonerated the three police officers associated with his death in a report released at the end of May during the beginning of the George Floyd protests, protesters took to the streets in massive numbers, with roughly 20,000 demonstrators throughout France violating pandemic protocols to rally for him. Drawing parallels between Adama and Floyd, many protestors seeking justice for Adama also expressed solidarity with the American protestors seeking justice for Floyd, including Adama's sister. (Note: Some French activists also chose to point out differences that made the movement in France distinctly French, with one stating that race relations in France was based on France's colonial past, and another stating that in America, racism was clearly identified, while in France, there was a denial of the existence of racism.)
  - Bordeaux: About 300 people protested in Parvis des Droits de l'Homme in front of the French National School for the Judiciary.
  - Lille: About 2000 people protested against racism and police brutality, seeking justice for Adama Traoré. Police used tear gas.
  - Lyon: Hundreds of people protested against racism and police brutality, seeking justice for both Floyd and Adama Traoré. Police used tear gas.
  - Marseille: Thousands marched in Marseille holding signs that read "Justice for all" and "No more murders" on June 2.
  - Toulouse: 2000 people protested in Toulouse on June 3 at the place du Capitole.
  - Montpellier: 5000 people in Montpellier attended the Je n'arrive plus à respirer ("I can't breathe") march one June 3.
  - Paris: About 20,000 people protested all throughout Paris to protest both the murder of Floyd and the 2016 death of Adama Traoré by French police. People protested outside the US Embassy. On June 2, thousands of protesters demonstrated in front of the High Court of Paris at the Porte de Clichy in northwest Paris for Floyd and Adama. The protest was illegal due to coronavirus restrictions. Police used tear gas. Another protest occurred on June 13. Some counter-protesters shouted antisemitic insults. The far-right identitarian group Génération Identitaire unfurled a banner from the top of a building which read "Justice for victims of anti-white racism. White Lives Matter." The banner was torn up by residents of the building. On June 30, a Confederate flag was noticed at a window facing the street of a police barracks, probably hung here in opposition to the Black Lives Matter movement.

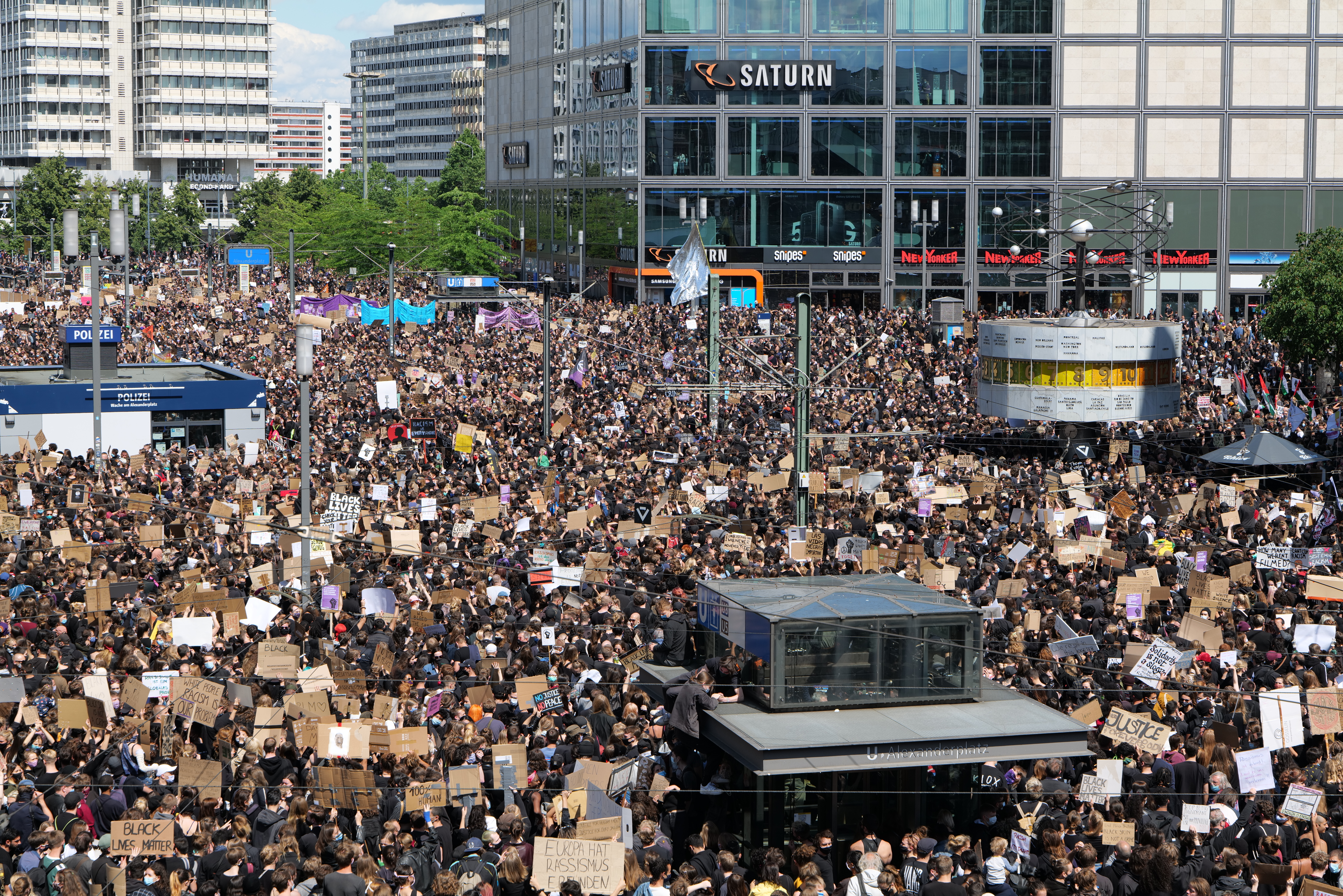
Protest at Alexanderplatz in Berlin

- Germany:

Over 100,000 people protested in over 40 cities and in all 16 states of Germany. (Note: All sources listed in main article.) Many people called on German law enforcement to address their racist practices and use of violence. Over the course of one particular day, 93 arrests were made that had been reported by the media.

- Luxembourg:
  - Luxembourg City: Over 1000 (Note: The embassy expected over 2000 protestors, and the organizers stated over 2000 showed up.) people protested peacefully in Limpertsberg in front of the US Embassy, despite rainfall. Protestors also took a knee during the demonstration, which was organized by anti-racism organization Lëtz Rise Up. A police spokesperson stated that pandemic restrictions had relaxed slightly during the past month, and that people were allowed to demonstrate. One officer expressed his surprise regarding how strongly protestors adhered to precautionary measures.

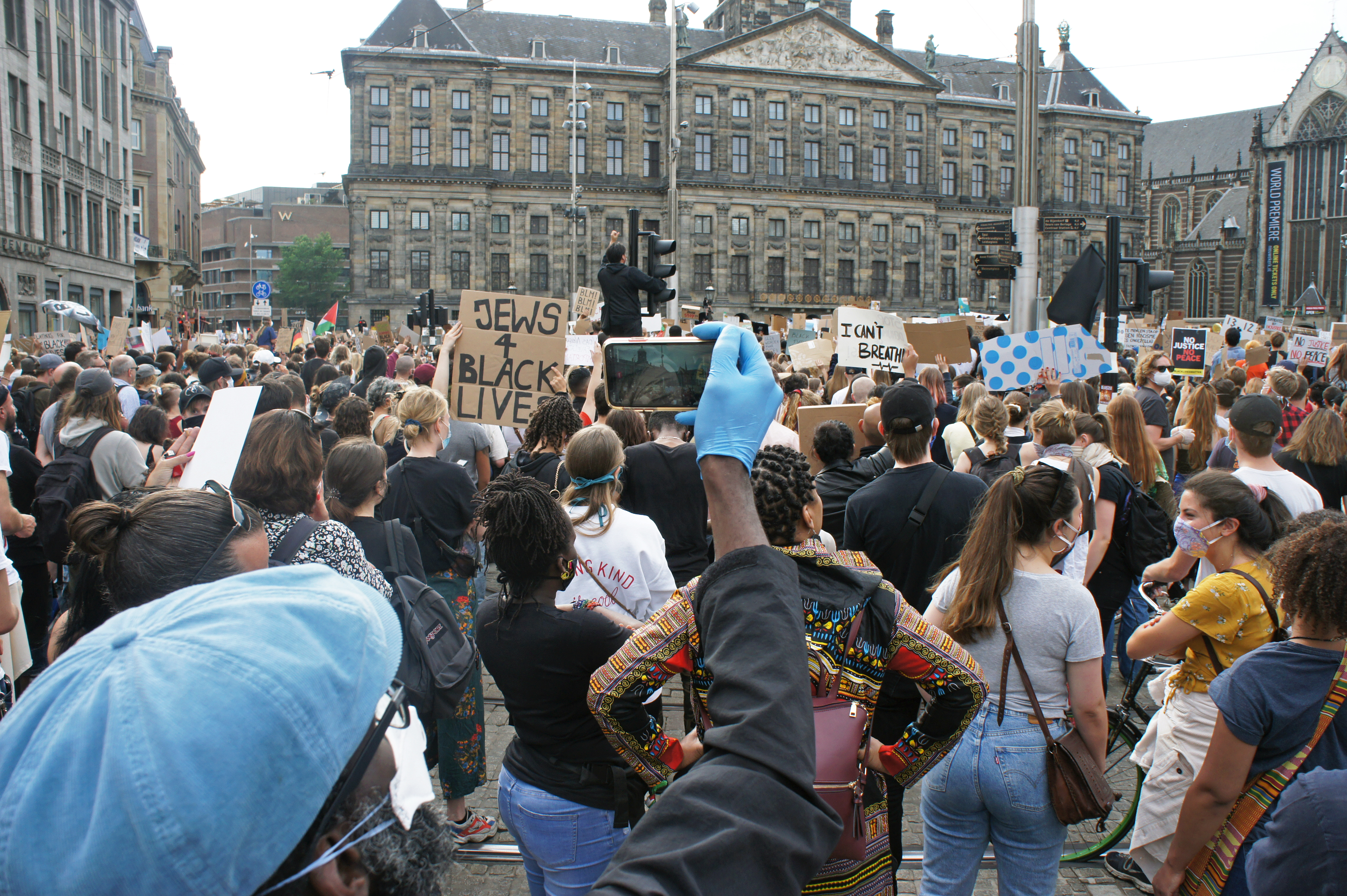
Protest in Amsterdam on June 1

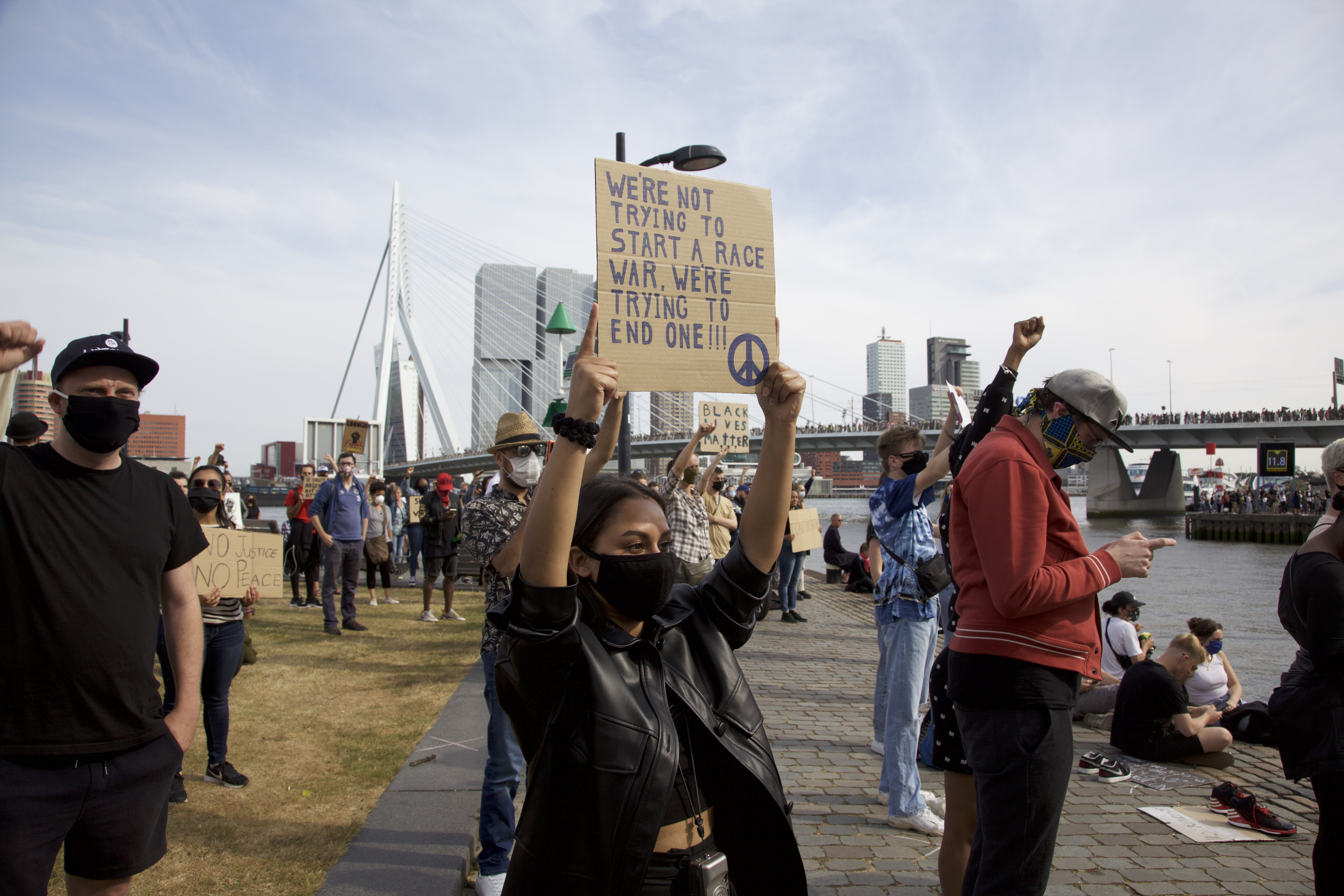
Protestors in Rotterdam on 3 June

- Netherlands:

People in the Netherlands protested to show solidarity with Americans and to demonstrate against issues with police or racism. Vigils and protests of up to thousands of participants took place nationwide. When asked to comment on the protests in the Netherlands, Prime Minister Mark Rutte said that racism is not only an American issue and that racism in the Netherlands is a "systemic problem".

- Switzerland:
  - Basel: About 5000 people peacefully protested against racism and police brutality. The protest was unauthorized, but the police did not stop it. Thousands of masks were distributed.
  - Bern:
    - On 13 June 4000 people protested, many donning black clothes. Most of the protesters wore masks.
    - Dozens of people protested in front of the train station.
  - Geneva:
    - A demonstration of 30 people on May 31 was broken up by police.
    - An authorized demonstration on June 9 brought over 10,000 people to march from Place Neuve to Parc des Cropettes. The protest was split into groups of about 300 to conform with pandemic regulations. Protestors took a knee and raised their fists in solidarity.
  - Lausanne: Several thousand people protested against racism and police violence, despite a ban on groups of more than 300 people.
  - Neuchâtel: About 500 people protested in two separate groups in order to conform to regulations restricting such events to 300 participants.
  - Zürich:
    - On June 1, a demonstration was held with estimates ranging from several hundred to 2000 participants.
    - On June 13, over 10,000 protesters marched peacefully through the inner city. Police initially tried to dissuade the protest, citing coronavirus-related health concerns, but ultimately permitted the march and oversaw its path.

== Americas ==
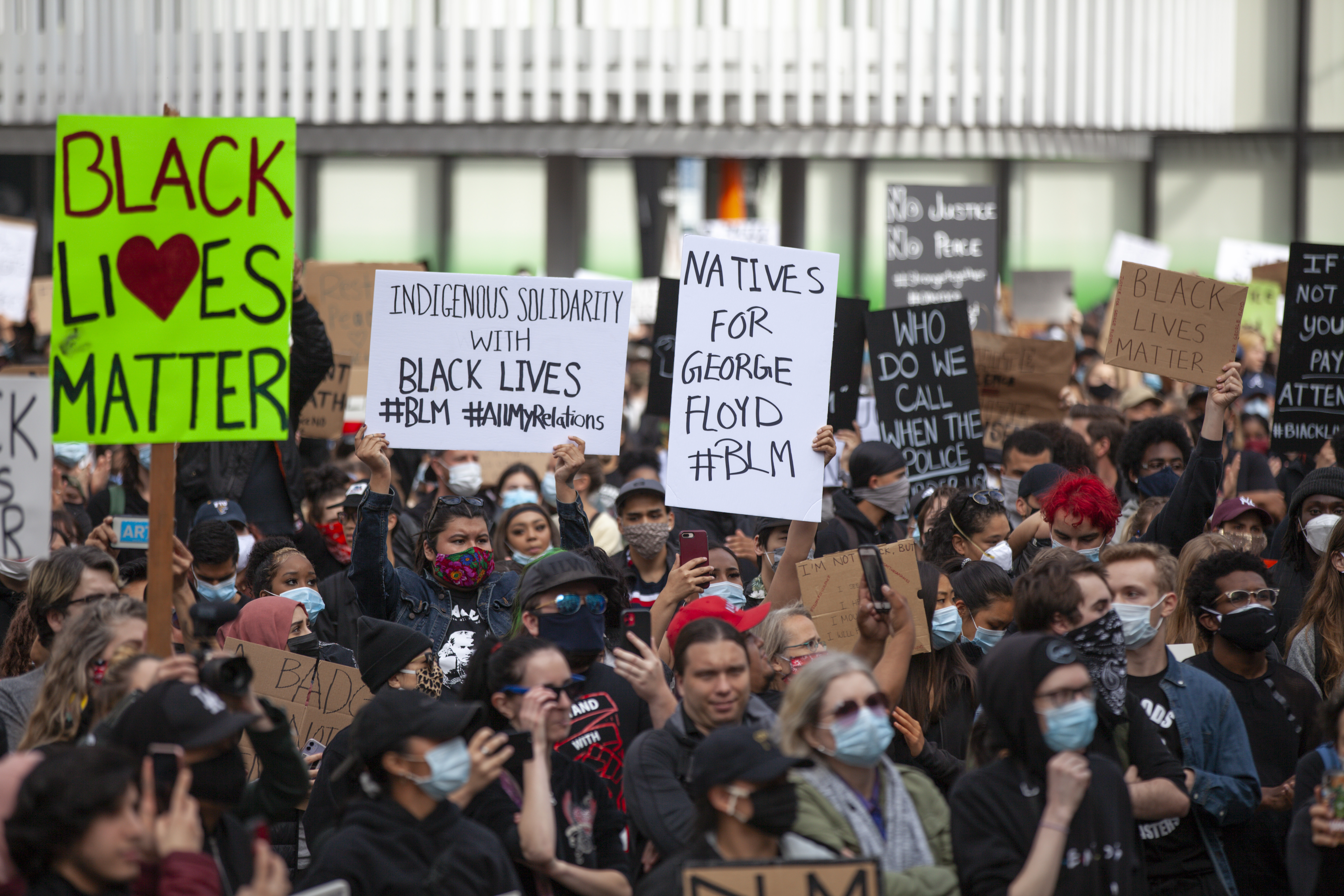
Protest in Vancouver on May 31

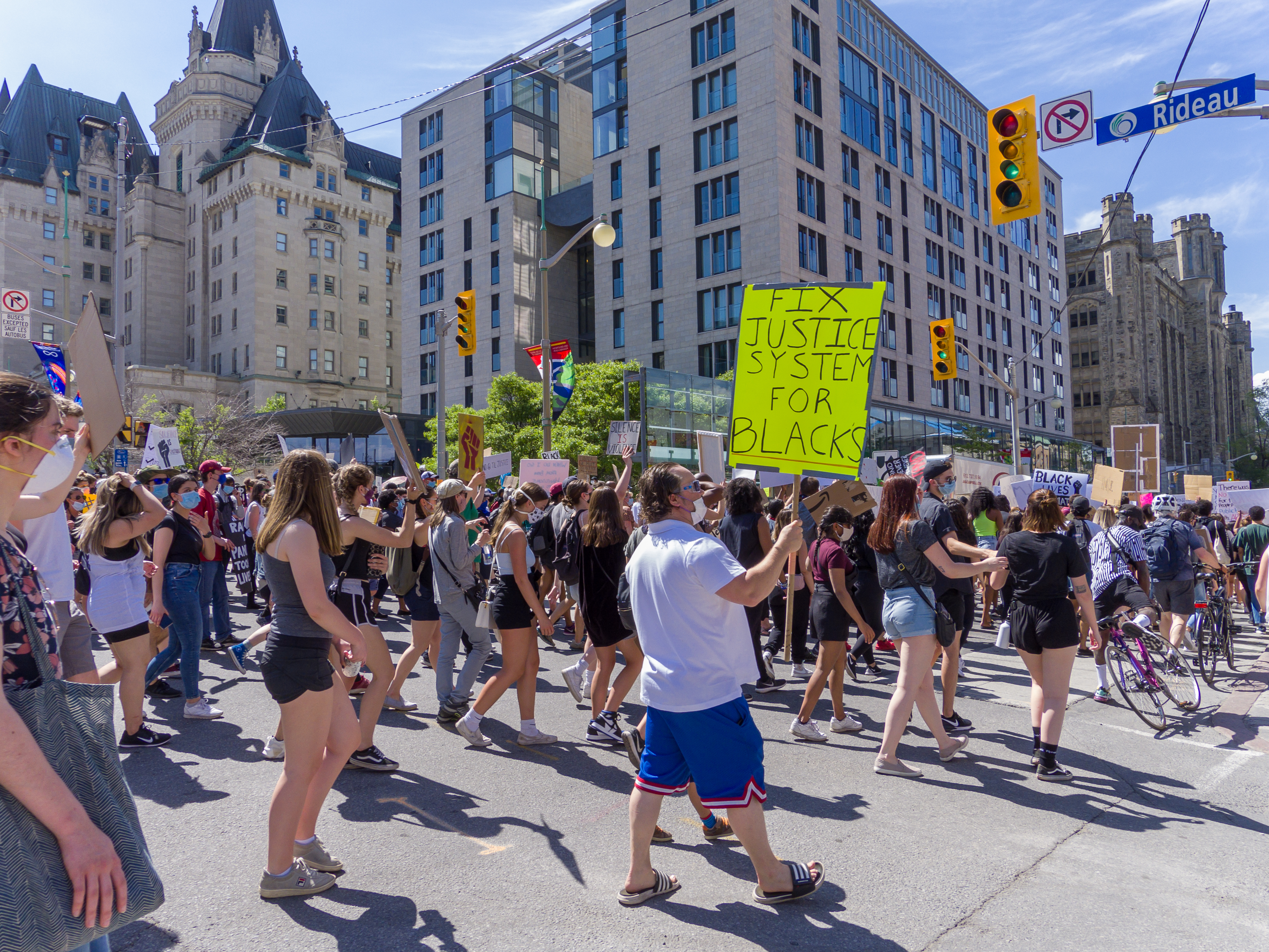
Protest in Ottawa on June 5

- Argentina:
  - Buenos Aires: Dozens of people protested in solidarity with Americans against racism and police brutality. Protestors marched from the area around Congress to the Obelisco and the American Chamber of Commerce. Some protestors also wore masks of Floyd, Luciano Arruga, or Santiago Maldonado. June 2: Hundreds protested in solidarity with demonstrations in the United States in Buenos Aires.
- Barbados:
  - Wildey: The Royal Barbados Police Force (RBPF) prevented a protest from occurring outside the US Embassy under the pretext of a 10-person social gathering limit due to COVID-19 restrictions.
- Bermuda:
  - Hamilton:
    - Dozens of people stood, knelt, and chanted in a peaceful 2-hour demonstration at the US Consulate General on June 1 against the murder of Floyd as well as the appointment as Consul General of Leandro Rizzuto Jr., a controversial donor to Trump's election campaign whom the US Senate already declined to approve for an appointment to Barbados.
    - On June 7, about 7000 people gathered in Hamilton to stand in solidarity with the Black Lives Matter movement. Protesters took a knee and also observed a minute of silence for Chavelle Dillon-Burgess, a young black mother who was first reported missing in April and is now suspected to have been murdered. The protest was believed to be the largest such gathering the community had ever seen.
- Brazil:
  - Curitiba: Thousands of people protested against racism in front of the Federal University of Paraná on June 1.
  - Rio de Janeiro: Hundreds of people protested at the square in front of the Rio de Janeiro state government palace on May 31. The protest also responded to the police killing of a local black teenager, 14-year-old João Pedro Pinto, who was shot in the back during a police operation in São Gonçalo. Police dispersed the protestors with tear gas.
  - São Paulo: About 3000 people protested against police brutality inflicted upon black Brazilians on June 7.
- Canada:

Canadians protested to show solidarity with Americans and to demonstrate against issues with police or racism in Canada. Vigils and protests of up to thousands took place in every province and territory of Canada. (Note: All sources listed in main article.)

- Colombia:
  - Bogotá: More than 100 people protested peacefully in front of the US Embassy, denouncing the murder of Floyd and of Anderson Arboleda, a 24-year-old Afro-Colombian from Puerto Tejada who was allegedly attacked by a police officer with a wooden mallet, suffering multiple blows to the head. Arboleda eventually died from his injuries days later. Protestors also requested the withdrawal of American troops from Colombian territory. The protest lasted for several hours.
- Costa Rica:
  - San José: The Legislative Assembly of Costa Rica observed a minute of silence in memory of George Floyd.
- Curaçao:
  - Willemstad: A small group of people protested in the center of Willemsted.
- Dominican Republic:
  - A demonstrations in solidarity with George Floyd took place in Santo Domingo on June 9, 2020. Activists set up a small altar for Floyd. During the demonstration, known local activists Ana Maria Belique and Maribel Nuñez were arrested.
- Ecuador:
  - Quito: June 9: A march in solidarity with George Floyd was held.
- Greenland:
  - Nuuk: A statue of Hans Egede was vandalized with the word "decolonize" spray painted on it on June 21.
- Guadeloupe:
  - Point à Pitre:
    - June 1: Several dozen protesters gathered in front of the Memorial ACTe.
    - June 3: A protest took place in front of the city's mairie organised by Combat Ouvrier and Rebelle. According to the organizers over 600 people took part in the protest.
    - June 6: A march organised by the non-profit organisation CoReCA to protest racism and called for the renaming of Saint-Françoi's Jules Ferry street to George Floyd, over a hundred people took part in this march at la Place de La Victoire (Victory Square).
    - June 9: 300 mourners gathered in front of the mairie to mark George Floyd's funeral.
- Jamaica:
  - Kingston:
    - A small protest was held in front of the US Embassy on June 4. Protesters denounced both the murder of George Floyd and the killing of Susan Bogle, a disabled woman of 44, who was killed by a soldier in August Town, St Andrew. Ambassador Donald Tapia came out to express solidarity with the protestors.
    - On June 6, several hundred people wore black in a peaceful protest outside the US Embassy to demand justice for both Floyd and the Jamaicans who have been killed by law enforcement. An additional protest was held at Emancipation Park.
- Mexico:
  - Guadalajara: Hundreds of protesters marched in downtown Guadalajara on June 4 to protest May 5 police beating death of Giovanni López, a 30-year-old man who had been arrested and killed for not wearing a face mask on May 4 in Ixtlahuacán de los Membrillos, Jalisco. 26 people were arrested after protesters in downtown Guadalajara committed acts of vandalism and burned two police vehicles as well as setting a police officer on fire. Without offering any evidence, the state's governor Enrique Alfaro Ramírez blamed President Andrés Manuel López Obrador for the aggression against the police. Mexican police have a long history of brutality and abuse, particularly against indigenous peoples. Three police officers from Ixtlahuacán de los Membrillos were arrested on June 5 for the murder of Giovanni López.
  - Mexico City: Large crowds gathered in Mexico City. Protesters waved placards with the words "No justice! No peace!", "I can't breathe" and "Black lives matter". Several hundred attended a vigil on June 4. A demonstration in the upscale neighborhood Polanco, Mexico City June 5 turned violent as protesters threw stones and Molotov cocktails at the US Embassy building (Note: The original US Embassy's main building is located in Colonia Cuauhtémoc.) and broke windows along Paseo de la Reforma; eleven people were injured, including six police officers and a teenage girl who was kicked by a police officer.
  - Tijuana: On June 7, 2020, more than 100 protesters marched throughout the city, from the police station to the border waving signs honoring George Floyd and calling attention to Giovanni López Ramírez who died in Jalisco police custody earlier in the year. Jaime Bonilla, the governor of Baja California, came out to greet them when they reached City Hall. There were also protests regarding the death of Oliver López, who died in the hands of police a short time before George Floyd.
  - Xalapa: Dozens of protesters gathered in Xalapa on June 8 to protest the May 2 arrest and death of Carlos Andrés Navarro Landa, 33. Navarro Landa was arrested for disorderly conduct and then died in police custody, officially from a heart attack but covered with bruises from a beating.
- Trinidad and Tobago:
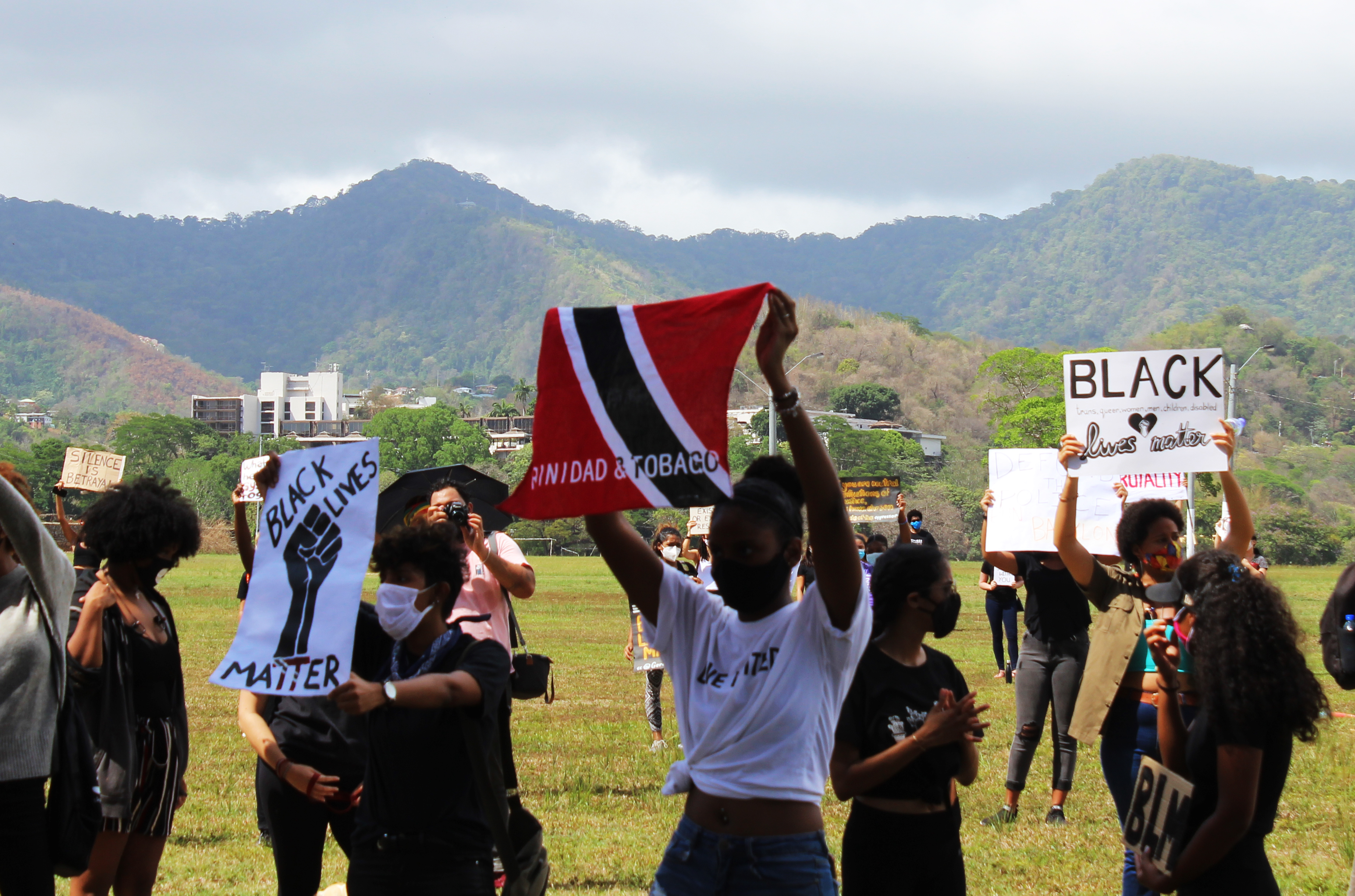
  Protest in Port of Spain on June 8
  - Port of Spain:
    - June 3: A protest organized by the Movement for Social Justice was held outside the US Embassy. A small number of people held signs for a few minutes before police asked them to observe social-distancing protocols.
    - June 8: Hundreds protested in support of Black Lives Matter in Queen's Park Savannah. The police commissioner attempted to speak to the crowd but was booed away. Another altercation occurred when a police officer attempted to film the group.

== Oceania ==
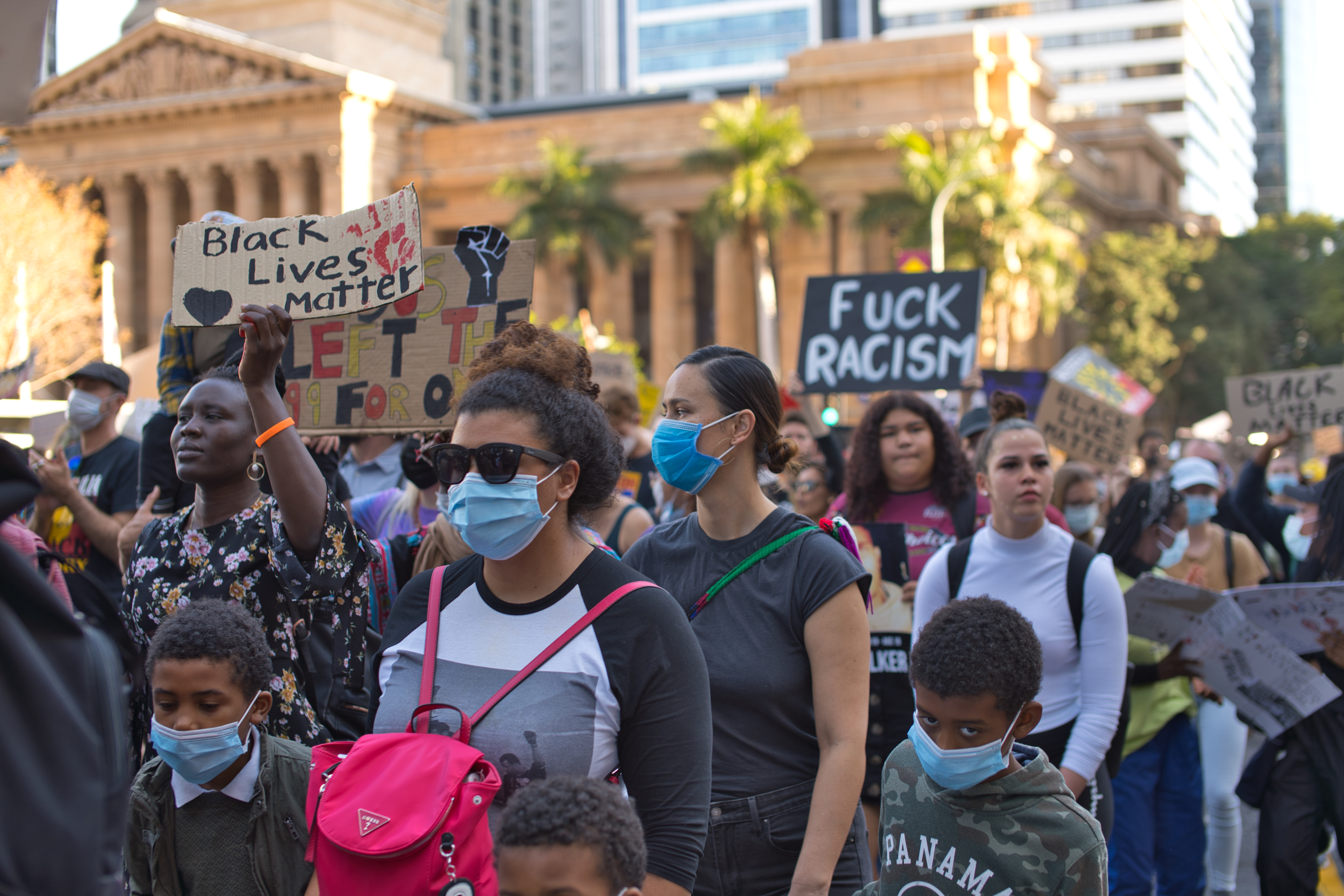
Protest in Brisbane on June 6

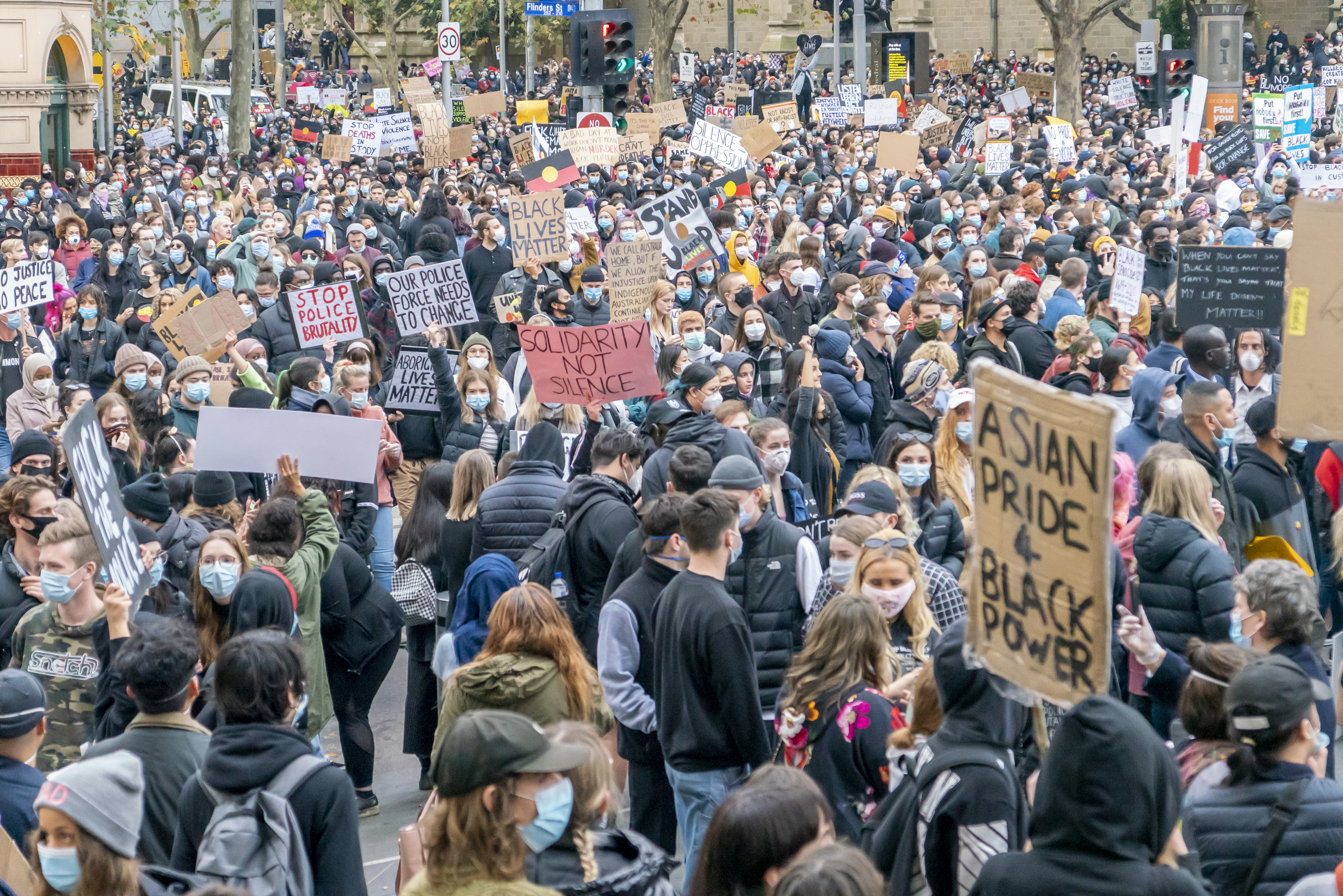
Protestors in Melbourne on 6 June

- Australia:

On June 6, protests involving tens of thousands were held in cities across Australia. These showed solidarity with the George Floyd protests, but also highlighted issues of racism within Australia including Aboriginal deaths in custody.

- Fiji:
  - Suva: 18 people protested in front of the US Embassy. Protestors laid flowers in front of the Embassy and stood for 8 minutes 46 seconds. Police were present to remind protestors of COVID-19 measures, and also removed the flowers shortly after they had been laid.
- New Zealand:

The George Floyd protests sparked a strong response among New Zealanders, in particular among the indigenous Māori people who face structural discrimination similarly to African Americans in the United States.

== See also ==
- George Floyd protests
- List of George Floyd protests in the United States
- Murder of George Floyd
