= Death of Adama Traoré =

2016 death in France

Adama Traoré
- Born: 19 July 1992; Beaumont-sur-Oise, Val-d'Oise, Île-de-France, France
- Died: 19 July 2016 (aged 24); Beaumont-sur-Oise, Val-d'Oise, Île-de-France, France
- Cause of death: Contested, heart failure or asphyxiation from sustained pressure
- Known for: Alleged victim of police brutality

Adama Traoré (French pronunciation: [adama tʁaɔʁe]; 19 July 1992 – 19 July 2016) was a black French man of Malian descent who died in custody after being restrained and apprehended by police. His death triggered riots and protests against police brutality in France, with new resurgence and resonance since the murder of George Floyd in the United States that some perceived as being under similar circumstances in 2020.

== Arrest and death ==
On 19 July 2016, Adama Traoré's 24th birthday, Traoré was out with his older brother Bagui in the Paris suburb of Beaumont-sur-Oise. Police approached the pair, seeking to arrest Bagui for extortion with violence against a disabled woman. During the exchange with police Adama fled for reasons that have not been clearly established. He was caught by officers, but fled again and was caught a second time. The officers locked a handcuff around one of his wrists, but Adama was having hard time catching his breath and requested a few minutes to rest, which they granted to him. At that point, one of the arresting officers was attacked and knocked to the ground by an unknown third party who fled the scene, allowing Traoré to escape again to hide in a nearby house. Three officers of the National Gendarmerie found him hiding under a sheet without the handcuffs and pinned him down to arrest him.

Following his arrest, Traoré stood up on his own but officers claim he seemed to be in some physical distress. He was taken to a police vehicle and then to the nearby police station, a journey that took 3–4 minutes. On arrival at the station, the officers noticed Traoré had urinated on himself and was unconscious but they stated that he was still breathing. The officers placed Traoré on the ground and called the emergency services. At that moment, Bagui, who had been handled by other officers, arrived at the station and upon seeing his brother on the ground he shouted: "Be careful with my brother, he has a health condition!". When fire service paramedics arrived and saw Traoré was no longer breathing, they called an emergency medical team from the SAMU who tried to resuscitate him. After an hour, Traoré was declared dead at the scene. After his death Traoré was found to have been in possession of €1,330 in cash and a bag of cannabis.

Traoré had previously been convicted of various offenses – including rebellion and violence against the police, extortion, drug related offenses, and stealing – and had been incarcerated twice. He had been released from prison in May 2016, two months before his death. He has also been alleged to have repeatedly raped his cellmate while incarcerated, whom the French penal authority subsequently compensated.

=== Post-mortem reports ===
A total of four autopsy reports were issued for Traoré. Initially, experts failed to agree whether the cause of death was suffocation after the police pinned him to the ground, or other underlying medical conditions (such as sickle cell disease) or hyperthermia caused by the chase in a heat wave. Others suggested the possibility of presence of drugs in his body contributing to his death, but an initial toxicology report on his vomit was negative for marijuana and alcohol. An additional toxicology report showed a high concentration of THC in his system, demonstrating that he had consumed cannabis at most up to 12 hours, and likely within two to three hours, before his death. A French legal report in 2020 also maintained there was THC in his blood. The official medical report eventually listed heart failure as cause of death. A second autopsy commissioned by the Traoré family, however, listed asphyxiation from sustained pressure as the cause of death. Two hours after his death, his body temperature was measured at 39.2 °C (102.6 °F) which the arresting officers' defense attorneys claim to be proof of hyperthermia.

== Aftermath ==
A lawyer specialized in police violence suggested that state medical examiners will tend to try to protect the system and lack independence. A subsequent internal police investigation exonerated the officers. In interviews Traoré's sister has stated that she believes that his death was the direct result of excessive use of force by the police whereas the two autopsies and four medical reports ordered by the magistrates conclude that the police officers were not responsible for his death. On July 10, 2020, the magistrates in charge of investigating the death of Traoré ordered a new medical report but this time to be carried out by doctors in Belgium.

His death sparked major protests in Paris, Lyon, and Toulouse under the slogan Justice pour Adama (Justice for Adama). The protests styled themselves after the American Black Lives Matter movement, and similarly focused on the grievance voiced that Black and Arab communities in France suffer disproportionately at the hands of the police.

== Legacy ==
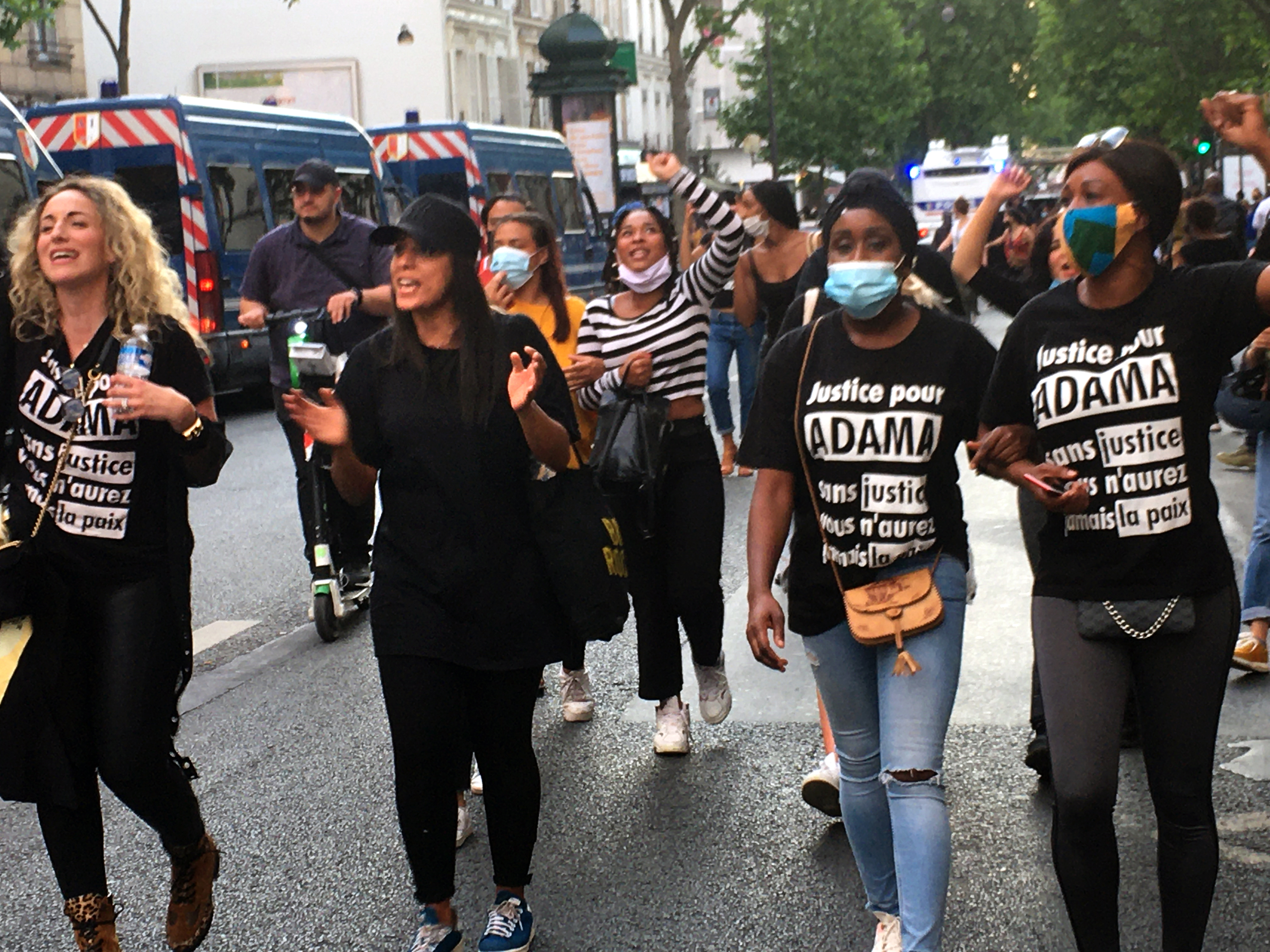
On 2 June 2020 in Paris

Traoré became a major symbol for anti-police brutality activists. His older sister, Assa Traoré, became an anti-racism activist as a result of his death. Assa herself was sued for defamation by three police officers she accused of obstructing justice, with the trial commencing in May 2021.

While in détention, Adame Traoré was accused by a cellmate of prison rape. His victim, Steven, was later indemnified by a national fund for victims. Yacouba Traoré, one of Adama Traoré's brothers, launched a punitive expedition against Steven and was later sentenced to jail for the beating and abduction of his brother's rape victim.

On 29 May 2020, French legal authorities released a final report clearing the three officers involved of wrongdoing and triggering renewed protests. Protesters also expressed solidarity with the George Floyd protests, which erupted in the United States and elsewhere in late May. Demonstrations in Paris, Marseille, Lyon, and Lille honoured both Floyd and Traoré. On 2 June, over 20,000 protesters marched again in Paris, along with 2,500 in Lille, 1,800 in Marseille, and 1,200 in Lyon.

A memorial rally originally planned for Saturday, 8 July 2023 in Beaumont-sur-Oise was banned by a court ruling fearful of a return of the urban violence that had shaken France in the preceding week. An unauthorized march took place in Paris the same day and was broken up by the BRAV-M, an Île-de-France rapid reaction police unit. An IGPN administrative inquiry has been opened into the circumstances surrounding the violence of the arrest of Yssoufou Traoré (Adama's brother), during which three journalists were also injured. The initial charges against Traoré were dropped shortly after he was transferred to the hospital on Saturday evening.

== See also ==
- Death of Abisay Cruz
